= Shotton Snowfield =

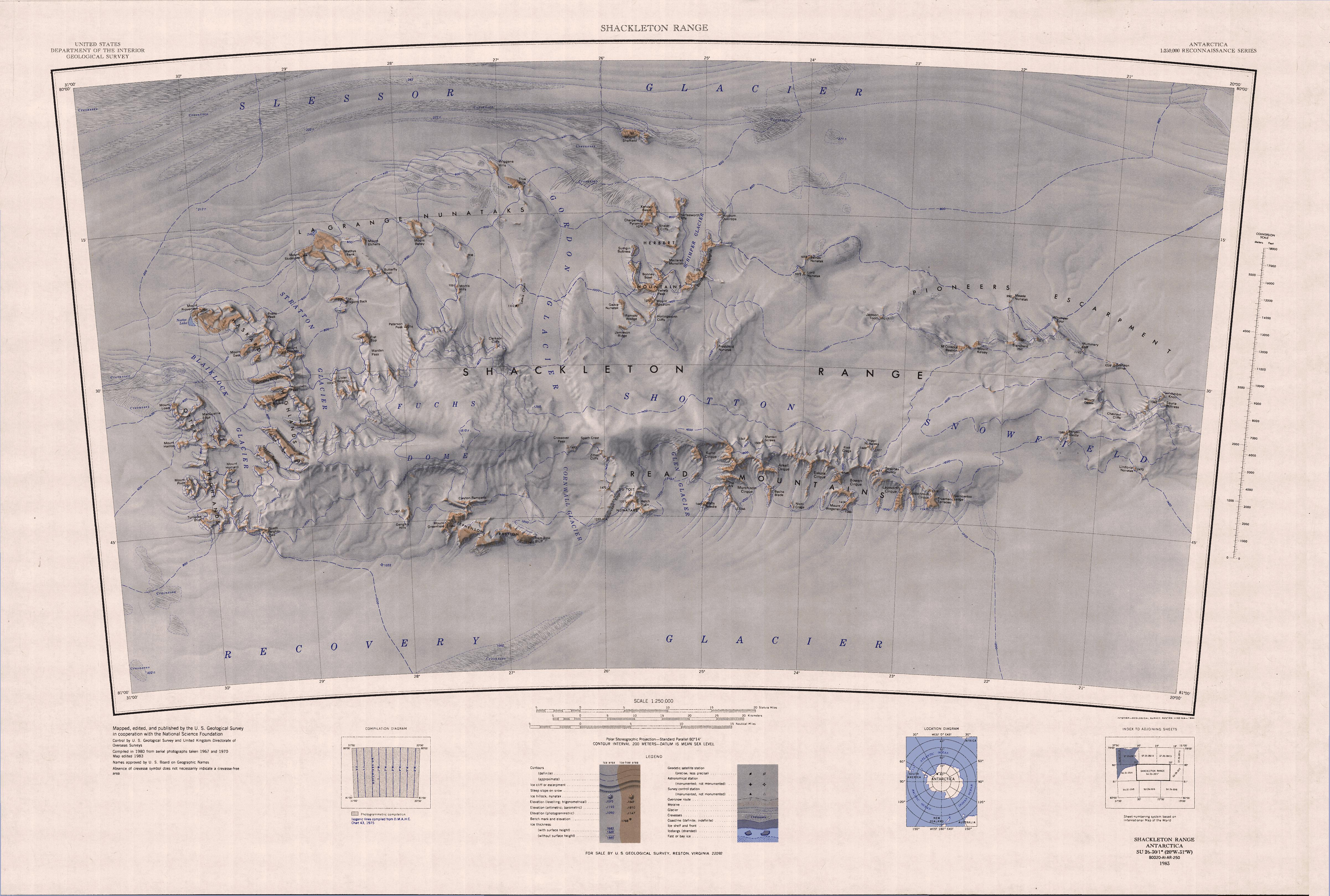
- Shackleton Range. Shotton Snowfield in the center.

Highest point
- Coordinates: 80°35′S 23°15′W

Geography
- Location within Antarctica
- Parent range: Shackleton Range

Shotton Snowfield (80°35′S 23°15′W) is a large snowfield between Herbert Mountains and Pioneers Escarpment on the north and Read Mountains on the south, in the Shackleton Range of Antarctica.

== Location ==
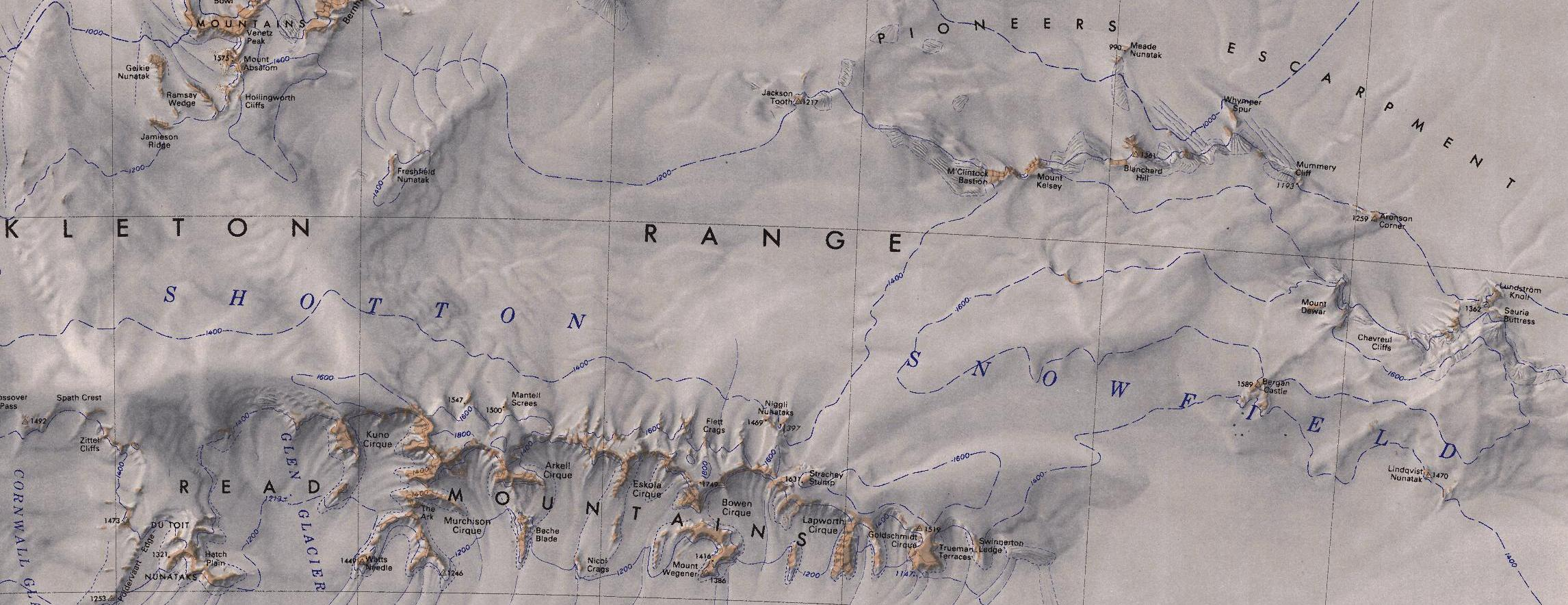
Shotton Snowfield

The Shackleton Range is an ice-covered plateau between 1,200 and 1,600 metres (3,900 and 5,200 ft) high that rises between two large glaciers. It is a rectangular horst rising above major fault zones now under the Slessor Glacier to the north and Recovery Glacier to the south. The center of the range is covered by a long ice cap stretching from the Fuchs Dome in the west to Shotton Snowfield in the east, and bounded by cliffs as high as 400 metres (1,300 ft).

The Shotton Snowfield extends east from the Gordon Glacier, which separates it from Fuchs Dome. The Read Mountains separate it from the Recovery Glacier to the south. The Herbert Mountains are northwest of the snowfield, and further east the Pioneers Escarpment lies between it and the Slessor Glacier to the north. The snowfield stretches eastward until it merges into the Antarctic ice sheet.

Shotton Snowfield, Fuchs Dome and the table mountains that surround them are the remnants of a peneplain. The southern edges of the snowfield have flat rocky areas against cliffs that rise for up to 400 metres (1,300 ft). The ice in most of the snowfield flows north, over the escarpment and into the Slessor Glacier. Ice from a small area in the southwest of the snowfield flows south between the Read Mountains and the Stephenson Bastion into the Recovery Glacier.

== Geology ==
The Shackleton Range Metamorphic Complex forms the metamorphic basement of almost the entire Shackleton Range. It seems to be part of the Antarctic Shield. It is formed from sedimentary rocks that have been metamorphosed in some regions, more in the south than the north of the range. The Flett Crags formation, part of the Turnpike Bluff Group, mainly consists of slate, but contains some bands of quartzite and pebbly conglomerate. It can be seen in the nunataks north of the Read Mountains escarpment. It is probably over 1,500 metres (4,900 ft) thick, and may be assumed to extend northward under the Shotton Snowfield. The Turnpike Bluff group rests unconformably on the Shackleton Range Metamorphic Complex. It has not been directly dated, but is probably late Precambrian or perhaps in part Cambrian.

== Exploration ==
The United States Navy obtained aerial photographs of the feature in 1967 and it was surveyed by British Antarctic Survey (BAS), 1968–71. It was named by the United Kingdom Antarctic Place-Names Committee (UK-APC), 1971, in association with the names of glacial geologists grouped in this area, after Frederick William Shotton (1906–90), British Quaternary geologist and Professor of Geology, University of Birmingham, 1949–74. Not: Shottonfonna.

== Nunataks ==
Isolated nunataks in the snowfield that are named on the 1983 United States Geological Survey map are (west to east):

=== Freshfield Nunatak ===
80°28′S 24°53′W. An isolated nunatak rising to c. 1,450 metres (4,760 ft) to the southeast of Herbert Mountains in the Shackleton Range. Photographed from the air by the U.S. Navy, 1967, and surveyed by BAS, 1968-71. In association with the names of pioneers of polar life and exploration grouped in this area, named by the UK-APC in 1971 after Douglas W. Freshfield (1845-1934), English geographer and mountaineer in the Caucasus Mountains and the Himalayas.

Freshfield Nunatak should perhaps be seen as part of the Herbert Mountains. Rocks include biotite schists and biotite quartzite.

=== Bergan Castle ===
80°36′S 21°21′W. A castlelike nunatak rising to 1,590 metres (5,220 ft) to the southwest of Mount Dewar in Shotton Snowfield, Shackleton Range. Photographed from the air by the U.S. Navy, 1967. Surveyed by BAS, 1968-71. In association with the names of pioneers of polar life and travel grouped in this area, named by the UK-APC in 1971 after Ole Ferdinand Bergan (1876-1956), Norwegian inventor who designed Bergan's "meis" (carrying frames) and rucksacks, patented in Norway in 1909.

Bergan Castle contains an intensely folded sericite quartzite or muscovite quartzite, partly blastomylonitic.

=== Lindqvist Nunatak ===
80°39′S 20°38′W. A nunatak 6 miles (9.7 km) south of Chevreul Cliffs, rising to 1,470 metres (4,820 ft) in the east part of Shotton Snowfield, Shackleton Range. Photographed from the air by the U.S. Navy in 1967 and surveyed by BAS, 1968-71. In association with the names of pioneers of polar life and travel grouped in this area, named by the UK-APC after Frans W. Lindqvist (1862-1931), Swedish inventor of the Primus pressure stove in 1892. Not: Lindquist Nunatak, Lindqvist Island.

Lindqvist Nunatak contains a plagioclase-microcline gneiss and a quartzitic gneiss with cataclastic and/or blastomylonitic texture. An amphibolite has also been found there that contained light-brown biotite with incIusions of zircon and rutile.

== Sources ==
- Alberts, Fred G., ed. (1995), Geographic Names of the Antarctic (PDF) (2 ed.), United States Board on Geographic Names This article incorporates public domain material from websites or documents of the United States Board on Geographic Names.
- Clarkson, Peter D. (1972), "Geology of the Shackleton Range: A preliminary Report" (PDF), Antarct- Surv. Bull, no. 11
- Höfle, Hans-Christian; Buggisch, Werner (1993), "Glacial Geology and Petrography of Erratics in the Shackleton Range, Antarctica" (PDF), Polarforschung, vol. 63, no. 213, pp. 183–201
- Roland, Norbert W.; Olesch, Martin; Schubert, Wolfgang (1993), "Petrogenesis of the Metasediments from the Pioneers Escarpment, Shackleton Range, Antarctica" (PDF), Polarforschung, vol. 63, no. 2/3, pp. 165–182
- Shackleton Range, United States Geological Survey, 1983 This article incorporates public domain material from websites or documents of the United States Geological Survey.
- Skidmore, Michael J.; Clarkson, Peter D. (1972), "Physiography and Glacial Geomorphology of the Shackleton Range" (PDF), Antarctic Survey Bulletin, no. 30
