= Fuchs Dome =

Large ice-covered dome in Antarctica

- Location within Antarctica

Highest point
- Elevation: 1,525 m (5,003 ft)
- Coordinates: 80°36′S 27°50′W

Geography
- Location: Coats Land, Antarctica
- Parent range: Shackleton Range

Fuchs Dome (80°36′S 27°50′W) is a large ice-covered dome rising over 1,525 metres (5,000 ft), between Stratton Glacier and Gordon Glacier in the central part of the Shackleton Range, Antarctica.

== Exploration ==
It was first mapped in 1957 by the Commonwealth Trans-Antarctic Expedition (CTAE) and named for Sir Vivian E. Fuchs, leader of the CTAE 1955–58.

== Topology ==
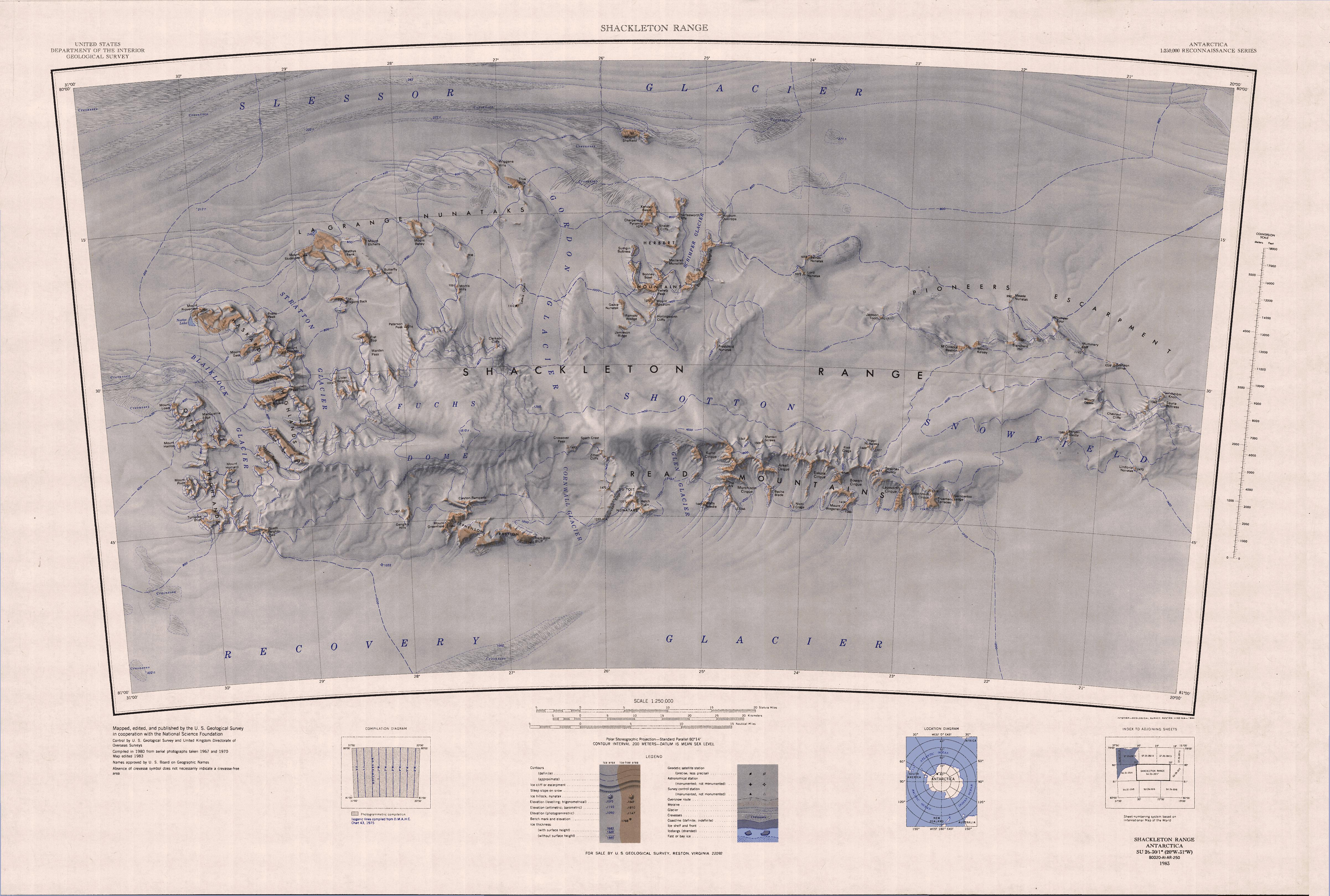
Shackleton Range USGS map 1983

The Shackleton Range is an ice-covered plateau between 1,200 and 1,600 metres (3,900 and 5,200 ft) high that rises between two large glaciers. It is a rectangular horst rising above major fault zones now under the Slessor Glacier to the north and Recovery Glacier to the south. The center of the range is covered by a long ice cap stretching from the Fuchs Dome in the west to Shotton Snowfield in the east, and bounded by cliffs as high as 400 metres (1,300 ft).

Fuchs Dome extends from Stratton Glacier east to Crossover Pass, where the plateau narrows to under 1 kilometre (0.62 mi) in width. It has an average height of around 1,500 metres (4,900 ft), and gradually slopes to the north down to 1,100 to 1,300 metres (3,600 to 4,300 ft). There are steep ice slopes along the margins of the plateau, which often have crevasses and in some places have ice falls. The plateau surface is a discontinuous and faulted undulating peneplain, most visible on the south of the range. The flat areas free of ice at the edge of the Fuchs Dome and Shotton Snowfield and the table mountains that surround them are the remnants of the peneplain.

== Features ==
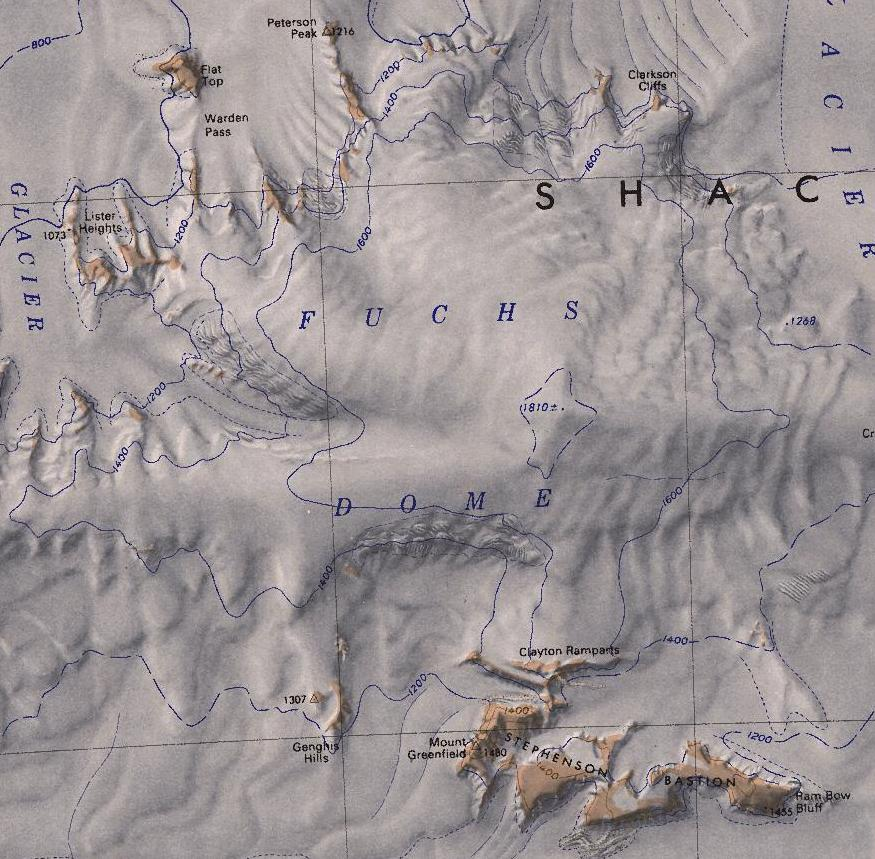
Fuchs Dome and surrounding features

Features surrounding the dome that are named on the 1983 United States Geological Survey map are (clockwise from west):

=== Stratton Glacier ===
80°22′S 29°00′W. A glacier 20 miles (32 km) long, flowing north from Pointer Nunatak and then northwest to the north of Mount Weston, in the Shackleton Range. First mapped in 1957 by the CTAE and named for David G. Stratton, surveyor and deputy leader of the transpolar party of the CTAE in 1956-58.

=== Lister Heights ===
80°31′S 28°35′W. Rock heights on the east side of Stratton Glacier, 4 miles (6.4 km) southwest of Flat Top in the west part of the Shackleton Range. First mapped in 1957 by the CTAE and named for Hal Lister, glaciologist with the transpolar party of the CTAE in 1956-58, and leader at the expedition's advance base, "South Ice," in 1957.

=== Flat Top ===
80°27′S 28°16′W. Distinctive table mountain, 1,330 metres (4,360 ft), with steep rocky cliffs, 4 miles (6.4 km) northeast of Lister Heights in the west part of the Shackleton Range. First seen and given this descriptive name during the early reconnaissance flights of the CTAE, 1955-58. Visited and mapped by the CTAE in 1957.

=== Petersen Peak ===
80°27′S 27°57′W. A rock peak (1,215 metres (3,986 ft)) standing 6 miles (9.7 km) southwest of Morris Hills in the north-central part of Shackleton Range. First mapped in 1957 by the CTAE and named for Hans C. Petersen, captain of the Danish ship Magga Dan which transported members of the CTAE to the Filchner Ice Shelf in 1956-57. Not: Peterson Peak.

=== Clarkson Cliffs ===
80°28′S 27°04′W. Ice-covered cliffs marked by rock exposures, rising to 1,400 metres (4,600 ft) at the northeast edge of Fuchs Dome, Shackleton Range. Photographed from the air by the U.S. Navy, 1967, and surveyed by BAS, 1968-71. Named by the UK-APC after Peter D. Clarkson, BAS geologist, Halley Station, 1968-70, who worked in the area for four seasons, 1968-71, 1977-78; Head, BAS Mineralogy, Geology and Geochemistry Section, 1976-89; at SPRI from 1989.

=== Gordon Glacier ===
80°17′S 26°09′W. Glacier at least 24 miles (39 km) long, flowing north from Crossover Pass through the Shackleton Range to join Slessor Glacier. First mapped in 1957 by the CTAE and named after George P. Pirie-Gordon, member of the Committee of Management and treasurer of the CTAE, 1955-58.

=== Clayton Ramparts ===
80°44′S 27°25′W. A line of east–west cliffs rising to over 1,600 metres (5,200 ft) at the south margin of Fuchs Dome, Shackleton Range. Surveyed by the CTAE, 1957, photographed from the air by the U.S. Navy, 1967, and further surveyed by BAS, 1968-71. Named by the UK-APC after Charles A. Clayton, BAS surveyor, Halley Station, 1969-71, who worked in the area.

=== Genghis Hills ===
80°44′S 28°02′W. Hills rising to 1,305 metres (4,281 ft) to the south of Fuchs Dome and 4 miles (6.4 km) west of Stephenson Bastion, in the Shackleton Range. Photographed from the air by the U. S Navy, 1967, and surveyed by BAS, 1968-71. Named by the UK-APC in 1971 after Graham K. ("Genghis") Wright, BAS general assistant at Halley Station, 1968-71, who took part in the survey, 1969-70.

== Sources ==
- Alberts, Fred G., ed. (1995), Geographic Names of the Antarctic (PDF) (2 ed.), United States Board on Geographic Names This article incorporates public domain material from websites or documents of the United States Board on Geographic Names.
- Höfle, Hans-Christian; Buggisch, Werner (1993), "Glacial Geology and Petrography of Erratics in the Shackleton Range, Antarctica" (PDF), Polarforschung, vol. 63, no. 213, pp. 183–201
- Shackleton Range, United States Geological Survey, 1983 This article incorporates public domain material from websites or documents of the United States Geological Survey.
- Skidmore, Michael J.; Clarkson, Peter D. (1972), "Physiography and Glacial Geomorphology of the Shackleton Range" (PDF), Antarctic Survey Bulletin, no. 30
