= Blaiklock Glacier =

Glacier in Antarctica

- Location within Antarctica
- Location: Coats Land
- Coordinates: 80°30′S 29°51′W
- Length: 16 nmi (30 km; 18 mi)
- Thickness: unknown
- Terminus: Shackleton Range
- Status: unknown

The Blaiklock Glacier (80°30′S 29°51′W) is a glacier 16 nautical miles (30 km) long, flowing north from Turnpike Bluff, then northwest to Mount Provender and Mount Lowe in the western part of the Shackleton Range, Antarctica.

== Exploration ==
The glacier was first mapped in 1957 by the Commonwealth Trans-Antarctic Expedition (CTAE), and named for Kenneth V. Blaiklock, the leader of the advance party of the CTAE in 1955–56 and a surveyor with the transpolar party in 1956–58.

== Location ==
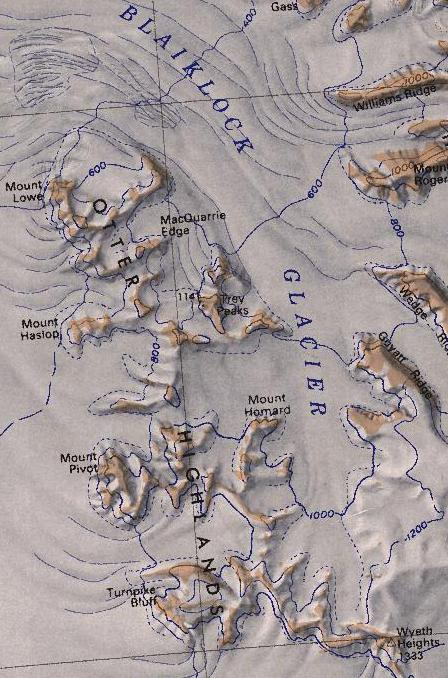
Otter Highlands to the southwest of Blaiklock Glacier

The Blaiklock Glacier is one of the larger of the glaciers in the Shackleton Range. The glacier forms below Turnpike Bluff and Wyeth Heights. It flows north and then northeast between the Otter Highlands to the west and the Haskard Highlands to the east. Small glaciers or snowfields trending east from Otter Highlands discharge into Blaiklock Glacier. At its mouth it flows to the south of Nostoc Lake and Mount Provender.

== See also ==
- List of glaciers in the Antarctic
- Glaciology

== Sources ==
- Alberts, Fred G., ed. (1995), Geographic Names of the Antarctic (PDF) (2 ed.), United States Board on Geographic Names This article incorporates public domain material from websites or documents of the United States Board on Geographic Names.
- Höfle, Hans-Christian; Buggisch, Werner (1993), "Glacial Geology and Petrography of Erratics in the Shackleton Range, Antarctica" (PDF), Polarforschung, vol. 63, no. 213, pp. 183–201
- Shackleton Range, United States Geological Survey, 1983 This article incorporates public domain material from websites or documents of the United States Geological Survey.
- Skidmore, Michael J.; Clarkson, Peter D. (1972), "Physiography and Glacial Geomorphology of the Shackleton Range" (PDF), Antarctic Survey Bulletin, no. 30
