= Pioneers Escarpment =

Antarctic escarpment

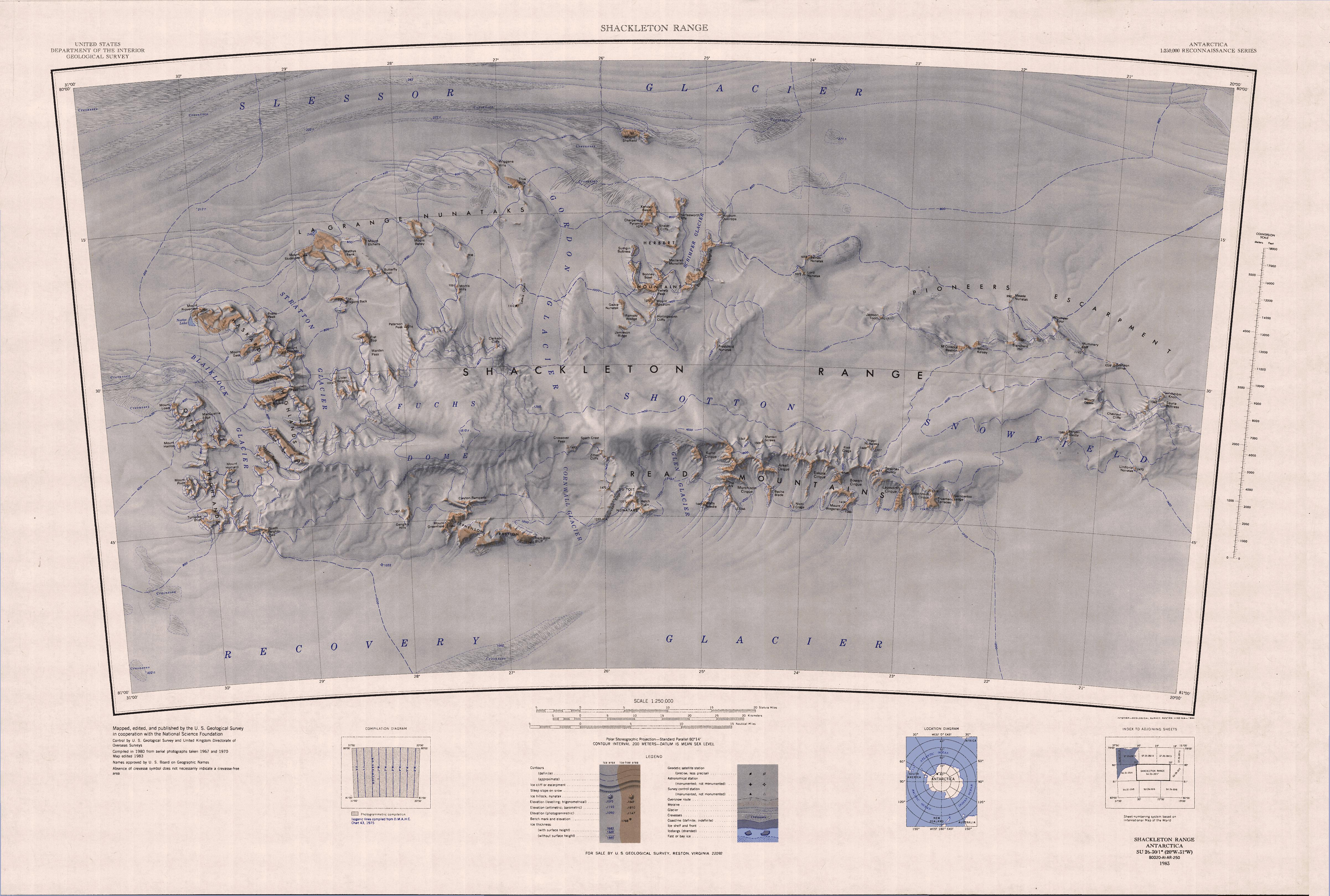
Shackleton Range. Pioneers Escarpment is in the northeast (top right)

Location of Pioneers Escarpment, Coats Land, Antarctica

Pioneers Escarpment (80°28′S 21°7′W) is a mostly snow-covered north-facing escarpment in Antarctica, interrupted by occasional bluffs and spurs, between Slessor Glacier on the north and Shotton Snowfield on the south, in the Shackleton Range.

== Exploration ==
The escarpment was photographed from the air by the U.S. Navy, 1967, and was surveyed by British Antarctic Survey (BAS), 1968–71. It was named "Pioneers Escarpment" by the United Kingdom Antarctic Place-Names Committee (UK-APC) because features on the escarpment are named after the pioneers whose inventions have assisted living and traveling conditions in the polar regions. The escarpment was visited and the rocks sampled extensively for the first time during the Geologische Expedition in die Shackleton Range (GEISHA) expedition in 1987–88.

== Geology ==
The outcroppings in the escarpment typically contain a succession of sedimentary rocks and rocks of volcanic origin which make up the Pioneers Group, a subcrustal unit. The metamorphic rocks of the Pioneers Group are a diverse series of metasedimentary rocks. Rock types include quartzites, mica schists, Al-rich schists and gneisses, calc-silicate schists, metalimestones and marbles, and amphibolites.

Most of the rock types found in the escarpment are metamorphosed from amphibolite facies, but cores of garnet contain traces of granulite facies. The metasedimentary rocks are from deposits that were laid down in shallow water on the submerged rim of a craton. During the peak of metamorphism both the sediments and the volcanics were subject to high pressures but relatively low temperatures of around 600 °C (1,112 °F). At this time they would have been as deep as 35 kilometres (22 mi), but were probably uplifted before the Ross orogeny 500 million years ago. Additional sedimentation occurred after this, creating non-metamorphic shales, sandstones and greywackes that may date to the Jurassic (200–145 million years ago).

== Features ==
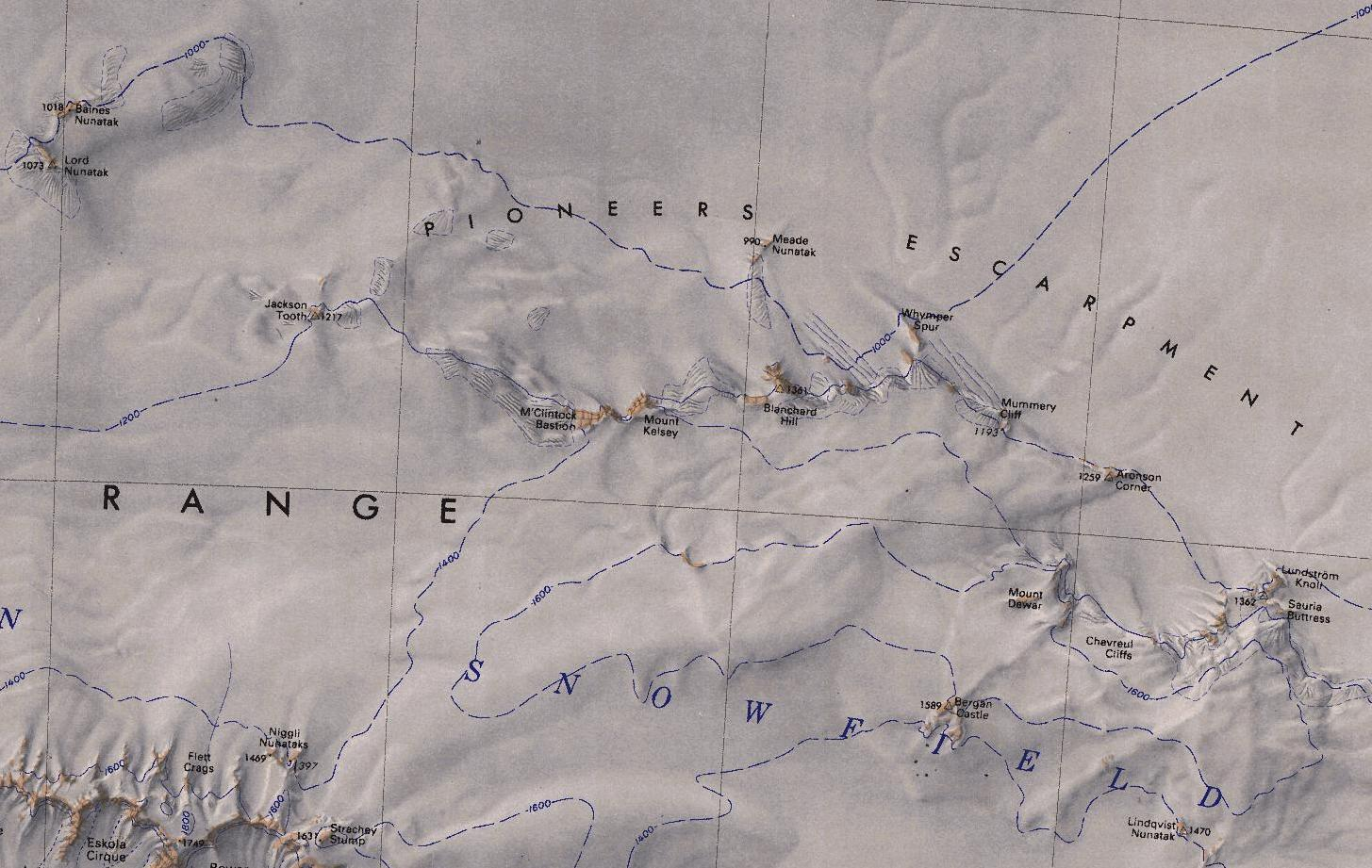
Pioneers Escarpment and nearby nunataks

Features of the escarpment and neighboring nunataks that are named on the 1983 United States Geological Survey map are (northwest to southeast):

=== Jackson Tooth ===
80°25′S 23°16′W Nunatak rising to 1,215 metres (3,986 ft) at the west end of Pioneers Escarpment, Shackleton Range. In association with the names of pioneers of polar life and travel grouped in this area, named by the UK-APC in 1971 after Major Frederick George Jackson (1860-1938), English Arctic explorer who in 1895 designed the features of the pyramid tent, later to become standard equipment on British polar expeditions.

Jackson Tooth has a visible band about 50 metres (160 ft) thick of medium grained marble, coloured light grey to white, containing tremolite. Below this is a band about 100 metres (330 ft) thick of grey marble, with up to 10% of its volume made up of star-like aggregates of chrysotile-asbestos. There may also be muscovite schists and muscovite quartzite holding accessory tourmaline, since rocks like this are seen about 2 kilometres (1.2 mi) north of the nunatak.

=== M'Clintock Bastion ===
80°28′S 22°28′W. Mountain rising to c. 1,400 metres (4,600 ft) to the west of Mount Kelsey in the Pioneers Escarpment, Shackleton Range. Photographed from the air by the U.S. Navy, 1967. Surveyed by the BAS, 1968-71. In association with the names of pioneers of polar life and travel grouped in this area, named by the UK-APC in 1971 after Adm. Sir Francis Leopold M'Clintock, RN (1819-1907), British Arctic explorer and pioneer in adopting Eskimo methods of overland travel; he took part in three Franklin search voyages, 1848–54, and commanded Fox, 1857-59, on the voyage to Arctic Canada that finally determined the fate of Sir John Franklin's expedition.

The main rock types on M'Clintock Bastion are tremolite marble, garnet-two-mica schist and staurolite-garnet-muscovite schist.

=== Mount Kelsey ===
80°27′S 22°19′W. Mountain rising to c. 1,370 metres (4,490 ft) between M'Clintock Bastion and Blanchard Hill in the Pioneers Escarpment, Shackleton Range. In association with the names of pioneers of polar life and travel grouped in this area, named by UK-APC in 1971 after Henry Kelsey (1670-c. 1729), English employee of the Hudson's Bay company, first white man known to have adopted North American Indian methods of life and travel (including the use of pemmican) in 1691.

=== Spaeth Nunatak ===
Spaeth Nunatak (Note: In 1993 "Spaeth Nunatak" was a recently assigned name and was not yet officially approved. It is not named on the 1983 United States Geological Survey map.) is on the 1,600 metres (5,200 ft) contour line about 10 kilometres (6.2 mi) south.south-west of Blanchard Hill. Rock types include impure marble which sometimes contains layers of quartzite. The coarse grained marble in other places includes rounded olivines, partly serpentinized, with chondrodite, opaque minerals and quartz. This marble has a high concentration of strontium, up to thirty times more than in other marbles of the Shackleton Range.

=== Meade Nunatak ===
80°23′S 21°58′W. A nunatak 3 miles (4.8 km) north of Blanchard Hill, rising to 990 metres (3,250 ft) in the Pioneers Escarpment, Shackleton Range. Photographed from the air by the U.S. Navy, 1967. Surveyed by BAS, 1968-71. In association with the names of pioneers of polar life and travel grouped in this area, named by the UK-APC in 1971 after Charles F. Meade (1881-1975), English mountaineer and designer of the Meade tent.

Rocks exposed on the Meade Nunatak experienced two metamorphic overprints around 1700 and 500 million years ago. The northern part of Meade Nunatak contains epidote-biotite-plagiocIase gneiss and epidote-biotite amphibolite. The amphibole has a texture that may indicate it has replaced cIinopyroxene. In the southern part of the nunatak there is biotite quartzite, biotite schist, garnet-biotite schist, plagiocIase gneiss with a small mica content, and plagiocIase-quartz-mica schists, There are also garnet-kyanitestaurolite-mica schists, staurolite-garnet-plagiocIase gneiss and perhaps a kyanite-quartzfels.

=== Blanchard Hill ===
80°26′S 21°56′W. A hill between Mount Kelsey and Whymper Spur in the Pioneers Escarpment, eastern Shackleton Range. Photographed from the air by the U.S. Navy, 1967. Surveyed by BAS, 1968-71. Named by the UK-APC after Robert Blanchard, American inventor of a light-weight tent using a rigidly tensioned frame erected outside the tent.

The hill holds a garnet-mica schist and biotite-garnet-amphibole schist, which is intensely folded, and to the northwest is thrust up onto an intensely folded sequence of quartzite with layers 20 metres (66 ft) thick holding beds about 40 centimetres (16 in) thick of light grey calciphyre.

=== Olesch Nunatak ===
Olesch Nunatak (Note: In 1993 "Olesch Nunatak" was a recently assigned name and was not yet officially approved. It is not named on the 1983 United States Geological Survey map.) is about 4.5 kilometres (2.8 mi) west.south-west of Whymper Spur. Rock types include a quartz-carbonate rock or carbonate-bearing quartzite, a garnet-two-mica schist and a garnet-hornblende-biotite schist.

=== Whymper Spur ===
80°25′S 21°29′W. A rock spur rising to about 1,250 metres (4,100 ft) eastward of Blanchard Hill in Pioneers Escarpment (q.v.), Shackleton Range. Named by the UK-APC in 1971 after English mountaineer and artist Edward Whymper (1840-1911), who made the first ascent of the Matterhorn, Switzerland, July 14, 1865; designer of the prototype of the Whymper tent, 1861-62.

Whymper Spur has a layer about 80 to 100 metres (260 to 330 ft) of marble with intercalated amphibolite mostly in boudins. The marble is a tremolite marble or a silicate marble containing cIinopyroxene and/or tremolite aggregates.

=== Weissenstein ===
Weissenstein (Note: In 1993 "Weissenstein" was a recently assigned name and was not yet officially approved. It is not named on the 1983 United States Geological Survey map.) (White Spur) is an outcrop halfway between Mummery Cliff and Whymper Spur. It is composed of a very pure, even-grained, white marble. It is named for its white appearance.

=== Mummery Cliff ===
80°27′S 21°23′W. A cliff rising to c. 1,250 metres (4,100 ft) to the southeast of Whymper Spur in the Pioneers Escarpment, Shackleton Range. In association with the names of pioneers of polar life and travel grouped in this area, named by the UK-APC in 1971 after Albert F. Mummery (1855-95), English mountaineer and designer of the Mummery tent.

Rock types include garnet-two-mica gneiss.

=== Aronson Corner ===
80°29′S 20°56′W. The cliffed extremity of a snow-capped ridge between Mummery Cliff and Chevreul Cliffs in Pioneers Escarpment, Shackleton Range. Photographed from the air by the U.S. Navy, 1967. Surveyed by BAS, 1968-71. In association with the names of pioneers of polar life and travel, named by the UK-APC after Louis V. Aronson (1870-1940), American founder of the Ronson Corporation, who in about 1910 developed the first practical petrol lighter, known originally as the "trench match."

Aronson Corner rock types include metacarbonate with metaquartzite. Dark grey caleiphyres (phlogopite-tremolite-diopside marble) are found with quartz-tremolite rocks.

=== Mount Dewar ===
80°32′S 21°11′W. A mountain rising to c. 1,600 metres (5,200 ft) to the southwest of Aronson Corner in the Pioneers Escarpment, Shackleton Range. Photographed from the air by the U.S. Navy, 1967. Surveyed by BAS, 1968-71. In association with the names of pioneers of polar life and travel grouped in this area, named in 1971 by the UK-APC after Sir James Dewar (1842-1923), Scottish chemist and physicist who invented the thermos flask, c. 1892.

Mount Dewar rock types include fine-grained fuchsite quartzite, with a very low proportion of mica, which occurswith amphibolite (as in Sauria Buttress) and microcline gneiss.

=== Chevreul Cliffs ===
80°32′S 20°36′W. Cliffs rising to c. 1,500 metres (4,900 ft) to the east of Mount Dewar in Pioneers Escarpment, Shackleton Range. Photographed from the air by the U.S. Navy, 1967. Surveyed by BAS, 1968-71. In association with the names of pioneers of polar life and travel grouped in this area, named by the UK-APC after Michel Eugène Chevreul (1786-1889), French chemist whose research on the nature of fats in 1823 led to the invention of stearine candles, used subsequently by polar explorers.

Chevreul Cliffs have marble with light green to yellow stains and wollastonite. A two-mica schist shows evidence of postcrystalline deforrnation. Some layers in the schist contain epidote and hornblende.

=== Lundström Knoll ===
80°31′S 20°25′W. A rock knoll rising to c. 1,400 metres (4,600 ft) to the northeast of Chevreul Cliffs in Pioneers Escarpment, Shackleton Range. Photographed from the air by the U.S. Navy, 1967. Surveyed by BAS, 1968-71. Named by the UK-APC in association with the names of pioneers of polar life and travel grouped in this area, after Johan E. Lundstrom (1815–88), Swedish inventor of the first true "strike-on-box safety match" in 1855.

Lundström Knoll has a two-mica gneiss that partly shows augen gneiss texture.

=== Sauria Buttress ===
80°32′S 20°24′W. A rock buttress rising to c. 1,300 metres (4,300 ft) to the southeast of Lundstrom Knoll in Pioneers Escarpment, Shackleton Range. Photographed from the air by the U.S. Navy, 1967. Surveyed by BAS, 1968-71. In association with the names of pioneers of polar life and travel grouped in this area, named by UK-APC in 1971 after Charles Sauria (b. 1812), French inventor of the first practical friction match in 1831.

Sauria Buttress has thick beds of quartzite containing fuchsite, which gives the quartzite a pale green appearance. The metamorphosed sandstone alternates with amphibolites.

== Neighboring isolated features ==
=== Lord Nunatak ===
80°21′S 24°01′W. A nunatak 1.5 miles (2.4 km) southwest of Baines Nunatak, midway between Herbert Mountains and Pioneers Escarpment in the Shackleton Range. Photographed from the air by the U.S. Navy, 1967, and surveyed by BAS, 1968-71. In association with the names of pioneers of polar life and travel grouped in this area, named by the UK-APC in 1971 after William B. Lord, Canadian artilleryman and joint author with T. Baines of Shifts and Expedients of Camp Life, Travel and Exploration, London, 1871.

Rocks exposed on Lord Nunatak experienced a Pan-African metamorphic event around 515–500 million years ago. Rock types include amphibolite, which was probably derived from an igneous rock. There are higher than usual concentrations of chromium, nickel and iron, so the parent rock may be a basic igneous rock such as basaltic komatiite. The nunatak also has gamet amphibolite and hornblende schists.

=== Baines Nunatak ===
80°19′S 23°58′W. Nunatak rising to 1,020 metres (3,350 ft) to the east of Bernhardi Heights and 10 miles (16 km) northwest of Jackson Tooth, Pioneers Escarpment, in the Shackleton Range. Photographed from the air by the U.S. Navy, 1967. Surveyed by BAS, 1968-71. Named in 1977 by the UK-APC after Thomas Baines (1822–75), English explorer and joint author, with W.B. Lord, of Shifts and Expedients of Camp Life, Travel and Exploration (London, 1871).

Rock types include garnet-two-mica schist and hornblende-garnet-plagioclase gneiss.

== Sources ==
- Alberts, Fred G., ed. (1995), Geographic Names of the Antarctic (PDF) (2 ed.), United States Board on Geographic Names This article incorporates public domain material from websites or documents of the United States Board on Geographic Names.
- Roland, Norbert W.; Olesch, Martin; Schubert, Wolfgang (1993), "Petrogenesis of the Metasediments from the Pioneers Escarpment, Shackleton Range, Antarctica" (PDF), Polarforschung, vol. 63, no. 2/3, pp. 165–182
- Shackleton Range, United States Geological Survey, 1983 This article incorporates public domain material from websites or documents of the United States Geological Survey.
- Will, Thomas; Gerdes, Axel; Frimmel, Hartwig (2009), "Palaeoproterozoic to Palaeozoic magmatic and metamorphic events in the Shackleton Range, East Antarctica: Constraints from zircon and monazite dating, and implications for the amalgamation of Gondwana", Precambrian Research, doi:10.1016/j.precamres.2009.03.008
