= Maclaren Monolith =

Peak in Antarctica

Maclaren Monolith (80°20′S 25°23′W) is a peak rising to about 1,000 metres (3,300 ft) on the central ridge of the Herbert Mountains, Shackleton Range, Antarctica. The feature is notable for a monolith forming the summit. It was photographed from the air by the U.S. Navy in 1967, and surveyed by the British Antarctic Survey between 1968 and 1971. In association with the names of glacial geologists grouped in this area, it was named by the UK Antarctic Place-Names Committee in 1971 after Charles Maclaren, a Scottish naturalist who in 1842 was the first to recognize the glacial control of sea level.
