= Turnpike Bluff =

- Location within Antarctica

Highest point
- Coordinates: 80°44′S 30°4′W

Turnpike Bluff (80°44′S 30°4′W) is a conspicuous rock formation in the Shackleton Mountains of Antarctica.

== Exploration ==
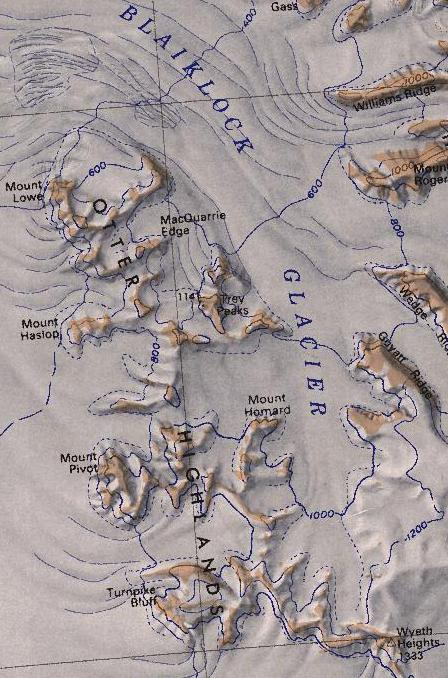
Otter Highlands to the southwest of Blaiklock Glacier. Turnpike Bluff in southwest

First mapped in 1957 by the Commonwealth Trans-Antarctic Expedition, and so named because it marks entry to a crevassed area of Recovery Glacier through which the Expedition's vehicles had difficulty in passing on their journey from Shackleton Base to the South Pole in 1957.

== Location ==
Turnpike Bluff is in the south of the Otter Highlands, to the north of the Recovery Glacier. It lies five nautical miles (9 km) southwest of Mount Homard, at the southwest extremity of the Shackleton Range.

== Geology ==
The Turnpike Bluff Group is a sedimentary sequence of rocks exposed on the south flank of the Shackleton Range. The sequence includes basal clastics and quartzite, followed by carbonate-bearing clastics with Riphean age stromatolite colonies, and capped by over 1 km of greywacke and quartzitic arenite, alternating with pelite. The sequence is underlain unconformably by an Archean granitoid basement (1400 Ma). Metamorphism occurred at 526 Ma. The group contains four formations, named after Wyeth Heights, Stephenson Bastion, Flett Crags and Mount Wegener. These are features along the southern margin of the Shackleton Mountains, from west to east.

== Sources ==
- Alberts, Fred G., ed. (1995), Geographic Names of the Antarctic (PDF) (2 ed.), United States Board on Geographic Names This article incorporates public domain material from websites or documents of the United States Board on Geographic Names.
- Clarkson, Peter D. (1983), "Geology of the Shackleton Range II The Turnpike Bluff Group" (PDF), British Antarctic Survey Bulletin, no. 52, pp. 109–124
- Paech, H.-J.; Hahne, K.; Vogler, P. (1991), Thomson, M.R.A.; Crame, J.A.; Thomson, J.W. (eds.), Crustal development: the Transantarctic Mountains, in Geological Evolution of Antarctica, Cambridge: Cambridge University Press, ISBN 9780521372664
- Shackleton Range, United States Geological Survey, 1983 This article incorporates public domain material from websites or documents of the United States Geological Survey.
