= Nostoc Lake =

Antarctic lake

- Location within Antarctica
- Location: Shackleton Range, Antarctica
- Coordinates: 80°24′S 30°5′W
- Type: Lake

Nostoc Lake is a lake lying 1 nautical mile (1.9 km) southwest of Mount Provender in the west part of the Shackleton Range. It was first mapped in 1957 by the Commonwealth Trans-Antarctic Expedition and given the generic name of the freshwater alga found growing in the lake.
