= Mount Lowe (Antarctica) =

Mountain in Antarctica

Mount Lowe (80°33′S 30°16′W) is a mountain having two peaks, the highest rising to 990 metres (3,250 ft), on the south side of the mouth of Blaiklock Glacier in the west part of the Shackleton Range, Antarctica. It was first mapped in 1957 by the Commonwealth Trans-Antarctic Expedition and named for Wallace G. Lowe, a New Zealand photographer with the transpolar party of the expedition in 1956–58.
