= Haskard Highlands =

Mountain range in Antarctica

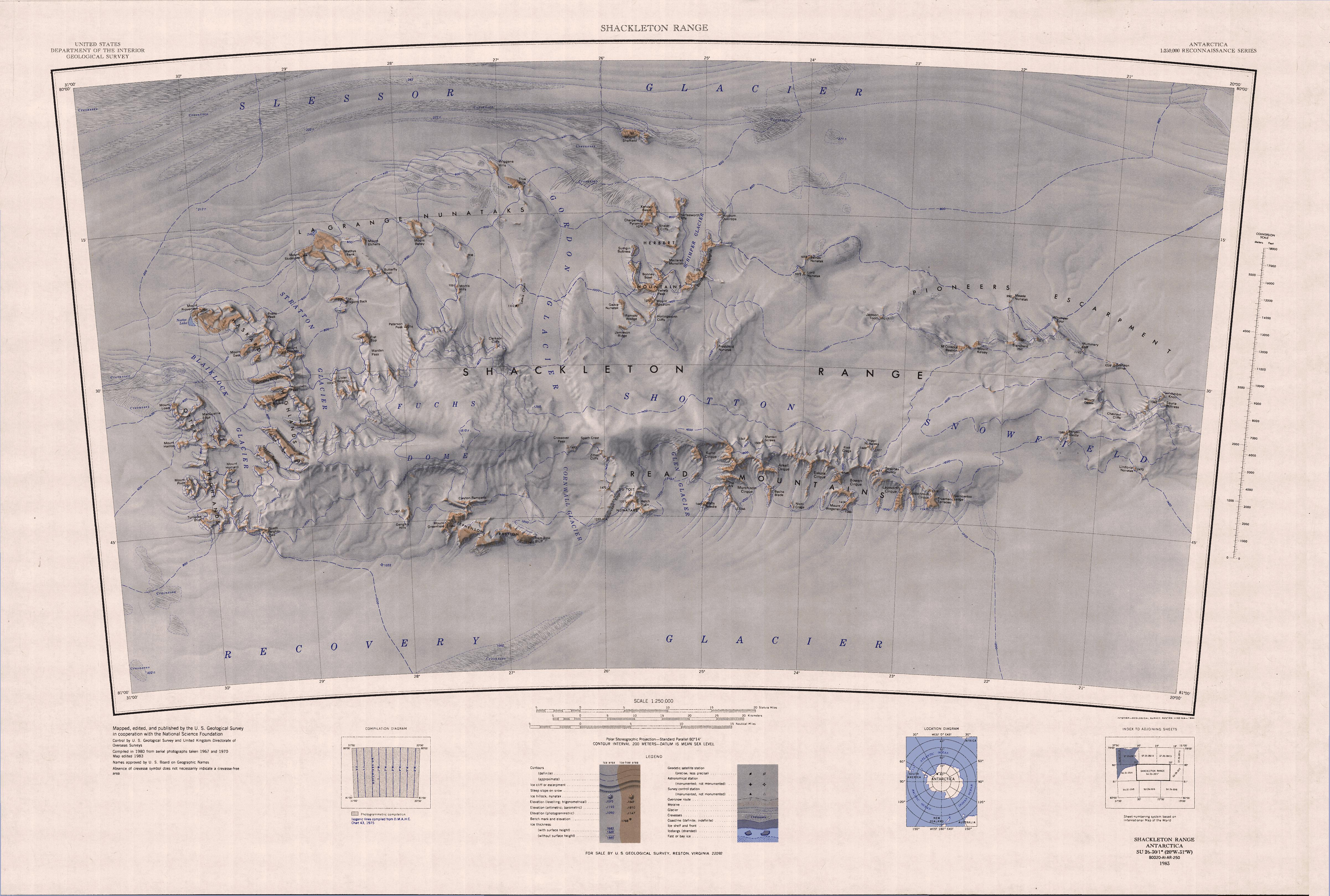
- Shackleton Range. Haskard Highlands in the northwest.

Highest point
- Elevation: 1,210 m (3,970 ft)
- Coordinates: 80°30′S 29°15′W

Geography
- Location within Antarctica
- Location: Coats Land, Antarctica
- Parent range: Shackleton Range

The Haskard Highlands (80°30′S 29°15′W) are a range of peaks and ridges between Blaiklock Glacier and Stratton Glacier in the northwest of the Shackleton Range, Antarctica, rising to 1,210 metres (3,970 ft) at Mount Weston and including features between Mount Provender and Pointer Nunatak. The highlands were first mapped in 1957 by the Commonwealth Trans-Antarctic Expedition, and photographed from the air by the U.S. Navy in 1967. They were surveyed by the British Antarctic Survey between 1968 and 1971, and named by the UK Antarctic Place-Names Committee in 1971 after Sir Cosmo Haskard, Governor of the Falkland Islands 1964–70.

== Features ==
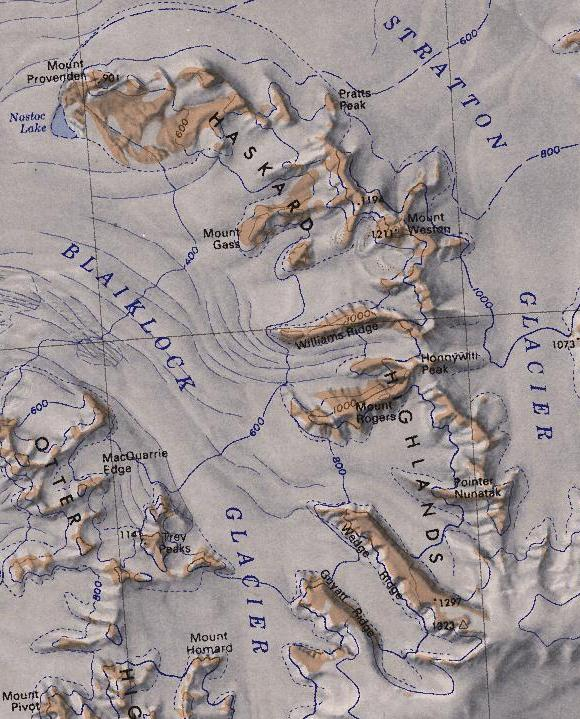
Haskard Highlands between the Blaiklock and Stratton glaciers

Features of the massif that are named on the 1983 United States Geological Survey map are (north to south):

=== Mount Provender ===
80°23′S 29°55′W. Conspicuous rock mountain, 900 metres (3,000 ft), marking the northwest extremity of the Shackleton Range. First mapped in 1957 by the CTAE and so named because members of the CTAE established a depot of food and fuel and an airplane camp on the south side of the mountain in 1957 to support sledging parties working in the Shackleton Range.

=== Nostoc Lake ===
80°24′S 30°05′W. Lake lying 1 mile (1.6 km) southwest of Mount Provender in the west part of the Shackleton Range. First mapped in 1957 by the CTAE and given the generic name of the freshwater alga found growing in the lake.

=== Pratts Peak ===
80°24′S 29°21′W. A rock peak 6 miles (9.7 km) east of Mount Provender in the west part of Shackleton Range. First mapped in 1957 by the CTAE; photographed in 1967 by U.S. Navy (trimetrogon aerial photography). Named by UK-APC for David L. Pratt, engineer, and John G.D. Pratt, geophysicist, with the transpolar party of the CTAE in 1956-58. Not: Pratt Peaks.

=== Mount Gass ===
80°27′S 29°30′W. A conspicuous rock mountain on the east side of Blaiklock Glacier, 6 miles (9.7 km) southeast of Mount Provender, in the Shackleton Range. First mapped in 1957 by the CTAE and named for Sir Neville A. Gass, Chairman of the British Petroleum Company, a supporter of the CTAE, 1955-58.

=== Mount Weston ===
80°28′S 29°10′W. The highest peak (1,210 metres (3,970 ft)) of Haskard Highlands, in the west part of the Shackleton Range. First mapped in 1957 by the CTAE and named after Flight Sgt. Peter D. Weston, RAF, aircraft mechanic with the RAF contingent of the CTAE in 1956-58.

=== Williams Ridge ===
80°30′S 29°20′W Conspicuous rock ridge, 1,060 metres (3,480 ft), extending east–west between Blaiklock and Stratton Glaciers, 1 mile (1.6 km) northwest of Honnywill Peak in the west part of the Shackleton Range. First mapped in 1957 by the CTAE and named for Sgt. Ellis Williams, RAF, radio operator with the advance party of the CTAE in 1955-56 and with the RAF contingent of the expedition in 1956-58.

=== Honnywill Peak ===
80°31′S 29°08′W. Rock peak, 1,220 metres (4,000 ft), immediately southeast of Williams Ridge on the west side of Stratton Glacier in the Shackleton Range. First mapped in 1957 by the CTAE and named for Eleanor Honnywill, Assistant Secretary to the CTAE in 1955-59, and later Secretary and Editor.

=== Mount Rogers ===
80°33′S 29°26′W. Mountain, 995 metres (3,264 ft), on the east side of Blaiklock Glacier between Williams Ridge and Wedge Ridge in the west part of the Shackleton Range. First mapped in 1957 by the CTAE and named for Allan F. Rogers, medical officer and physiologist with the transpolar party of the CTAE in 1956-58.

=== Pointer Nunatak ===
80°37′S 29°00′W. Conspicuous nunatak, 1,245 metres (4,085 ft), immediately east of Wedge Ridge in the west part of the Shackleton Range. First mapped in 1957 by the CTAE and so named because it is an important landmark on the route from Blaiklock Glacier to Stratton Glacier which provides access from the west to the east part of the Shackleton Range.

=== Wedge Ridge ===
80°38′S 29°12′W. Conspicuous rock ridge, 1,145 metres (3,757 ft), near the head of Blaiklock Glacier and immediately west of Pointer Nunatak in the west part of the Shackleton Range. First mapped in 1957 by the CTAE. The name given by the UK-APC is descriptive of the shape of the feature.

=== Guyatt Ridge ===
80°38′S 29°27′W. A ridge southwest of Wedge Ridge in the south part of Haskard Highlands, Shackleton Range. Surveyed by the CTAE, 1957, photographed from the air by the U.S. Navy, 1967, and further surveyed by BAS, 1968-71. Named by the UK-APC after Malcolm J. Guyatt, BAS general assistant, Halley Station, 1969-71, who worked in Shackleton Range, 1969-70.

== Sources ==
- Alberts, Fred G., ed. (1995), Geographic Names of the Antarctic (PDF) (2 ed.), United States Board on Geographic Names This article incorporates public domain material from websites or documents of the United States Board on Geographic Names.
- Shackleton Range, United States Geological Survey, 1983 This article incorporates public domain material from websites or documents of the United States Geological Survey.
