= Mount Weston =

Mountain in Antarctica

Mount Weston (80°28′S 29°10′W) is the highest peak (1,210 m) of Haskard Highlands, in the west part of the Shackleton Range. It was first mapped in 1957 by the Commonwealth Trans-Antarctic Expedition and named after Flight Sgt. Peter D. Weston, RAF, an aircraft mechanic with the RAF contingent of the Commonwealth Trans-Antarctic Expedition in 1956–58.
