= Shackleton Range =

Mountain range in Antarctica

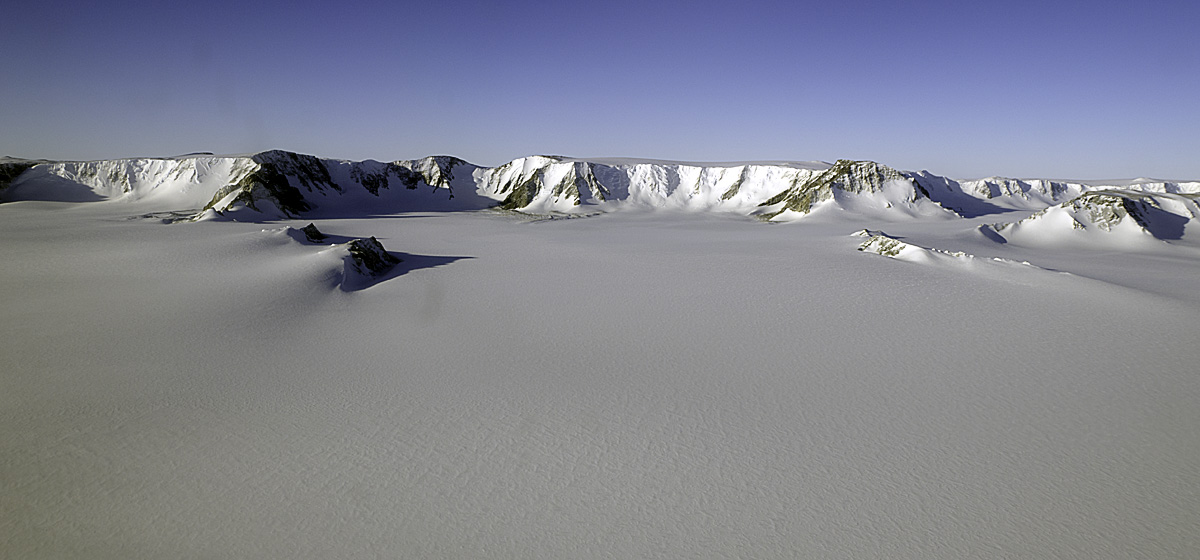
- The Shackleton Range, just out of the ice sheet between Slessor and Recovery glaciers.

Highest point
- Peak: Holmes Summit
- Elevation: 1,875 m (6,152 ft)

Geography
- Location within Antarctica
- Continent: Antarctica
- Region: Coats Land
- Range coordinates: 80°30′S 25°00′W

The Shackleton Range (80°30′S 25°00′W) is a mountain range in Antarctica that rises to 1,875 metres (6,152 ft) and extends in an east–west direction for about 100 miles (160 km) between the Slessor and Recovery Glaciers.

== Surveys ==
The Commonwealth Trans-Antarctic Expedition (CTAE), which in 1956 saw the range from the air, conducted a ground-level survey of its western part in 1957. The United States Navy photographed the range from the air in 1967. In 1968–69 and 1969–70, the British Antarctic Survey (based at Halley Station) conducted further ground surveys with support from US Navy C-130 Hercules aircraft. The range was named after Sir Ernest Shackleton (1874–1922), leader of the British Imperial Trans-Antarctic Expedition (or "Shackleton's Expedition") of 1914–1916, the unsuccessful forerunner of the Commonwealth Trans-Antarctic Expedition (CTAE). Unofficial names include Cordillera Los Menucos, Cordon Los Menucos, Shackletonkjeda, Shackleton Mountains.

== Geology ==
The range is at the northwestern edge of the East Antarctic Craton. To the west of the Shackleton Range, the Transantarctic Mountains run from north to south. These mountains formed around 500 million years ago during the Pan-African Ross Orogony along the former Pacific edge of the East Antarctic Craton. The two ranges differ in structural trends, being almost at right angles to each, and in rock types. It is commonly thought that the Shackleton Range was caused by an oblique collision between the East Antarctic and Kalahari cratons that closed the Mozambique Ocean.

The Haskard Group and Turnpike Bluff Group rest unconformably on the Archean-Middle Proterozoic Shackleton Range Metamorphic Complex. The Ordovician-Early Devonian Blaiklock Glacier Group (475 Ma) also unconformably overlies the Shackleton Range Metamorphic Complex. This group is composed of sandstones and conglomerates, and is unconformably overlain by the Beacon Supergroup.

== Tectonic history ==
The range comprises three separate terranes with very different histories. Analysis of geochronological data in these terranes implies that East Antarctica finally came together during the Pan-African orogeny, and its components were separate earlier in the Mesoproterozoic.

=== Southern Terrane ===
The southern belt, exposed in the Read Mountains, has medium- to high-grade metamorphic rocks classified as the Read Group. They are mainly composed of partly migmatised quartzitic, basic, calcareous and pelitic rocks. In places they are interlayered with gneissic granites, and intruded by granites and basic rocks. Dating of the metagranites gives ages of around 1,760 and 1,600 million years. Rb–Sr and K-Ar mineral cooling ages are 1650–1550 million years.

The Southern Terrane has detritus up to 2,850 million years old that experienced magmatism from 1,850 to 1,810 million years ago, a metamorphic event between 1,710 and 1,680 years ago, and another metamorphic event 510 million years ago. Tectonics in the Southern Terrane during the Paleoproterozoic was very similar to that of the Mawson Continent, which may mean that this continent extends over the Eastern Antarctic Shield and includes the Shackleton Range.

=== Eastern Terrane ===
The Eastern Terrane holds granitoid rocks formed around 1,060 million years ago during the Grenville orogeny that experienced metamorphism around 600 million years ago. The events at 1,060 and 600 million years ago are similar to the Grenvillian and Pan-African tectonics in Queen Maud Land, suggesting that the Shackleton Range holds part of the Pan African Mozambique/Maud Belt. The suture located in the extreme east of the range was formed during the amalgamation of West Gondwana and the Indo-Antarctic plate.

=== Northern Terrane ===
The northern belt extends from the Pioneer Escarpment in the east to the northern Haskard Highlands in the west. It has been divided into the Pioneers Group, the Stratton Group, and an ophiolite complex that may be a relic of the Mozambique Ocean. The Northern Terrane has paragneisses, mafic and ultramafic rocks that host granites and diorites dating to 530 million years ago, which experienced metamorphism 510 to 500 million years ago. This terrane holds the suture formed when the combined Indo-Antarctic/West Gondwanan block collided with East Gondwana about 510 million years ago. The suture may also extend through the Sør Rondane Mountains and the Lützow-Holm Bay area to the north.

== Topology ==
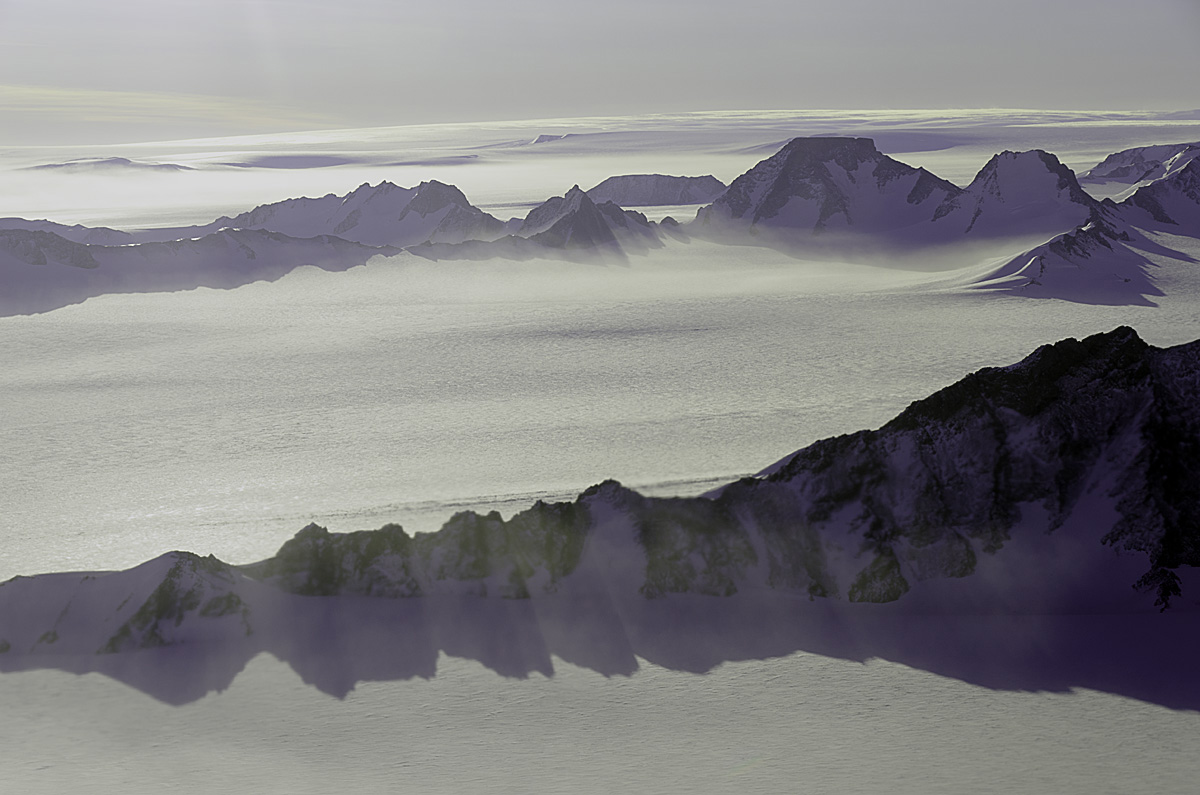
View from NASA's DC-8 flight over the continent on 21 October 2011

The Shackleton Range is 170 kilometres (110 mi) long in an east-west direction and up to 70 kilometres (43 mi) wide. It stretches from the Filchner Ice Shelf eastward until it is fully covered at a height of about 2,000 metres (6,600 ft) by the Antarctic ice sheet. The range is an ice-covered plateau between 1,200 and 1,600 metres (3,900 and 5,200 ft) high that rises between two large glaciers. The plateau generally slopes down to the north, so most of the ice from the range flows via wide glaciers into the fast-moving Slessor Glacier, and much less flows south into the slower-moving Recovery Glacier. This probably explains why erosion is higher in the north of the range.

The Shackleton Range is a rectangular horst rising above major fault zones now under the Slessor and Recovery glaciers. The center of the range is covered by a long ice cap extending from the Fuchs Dome in the west to Shotton Snowfield in the east, and bounded by cliffs as high as 400 metres (1,300 ft). There are areas of rocky outcrop around the margins of the plateau. The Read Mountains on the southeast edge of the range are the highest, at 1,800 to 1,950 metres (5,910 to 6,400 ft), while there are lower peaks at 700 to 900 metres (2,300 to 3,000 ft) along the northern edge. The connected valleys of the north-flowing Gordon Glacier and south-flowing Cornwall Glacier may reflect an underlying fault zone, and have been treated as a divide between the western and eastern portions of the Shackleton Range.

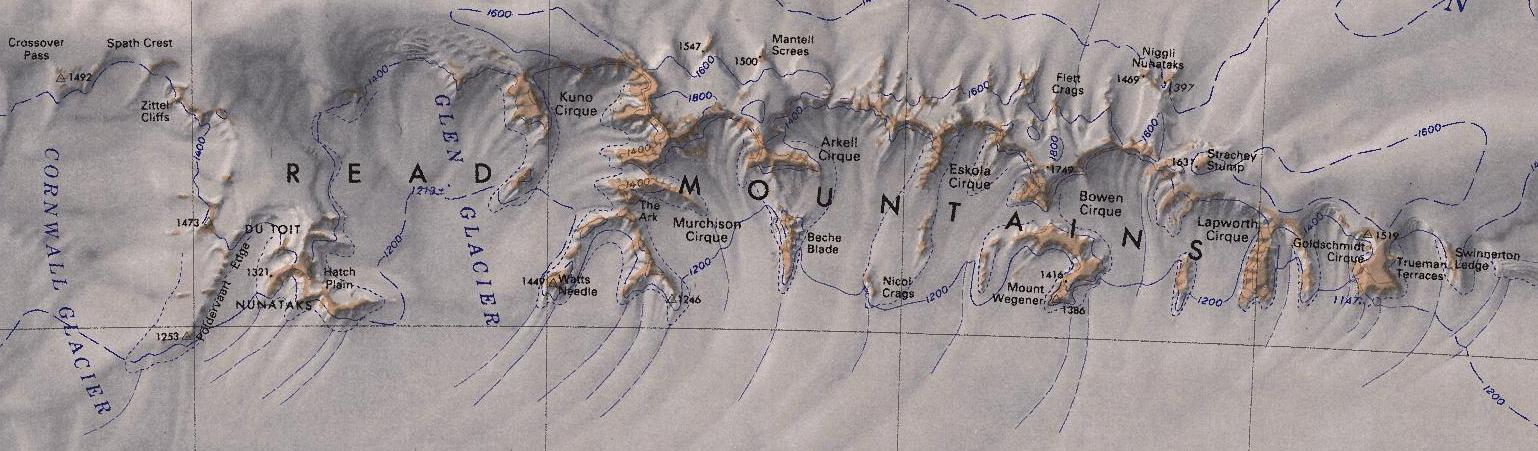
Read Mountains

The plateau surface is a discontinuous and faulted undulating peneplain, most visible on the south of the range. The flat areas free of ice at the edge of the Fuchs Dome and Shotton Snowfield and the table mountains that surround them are the remnants of the peneplain. In the Read Mountains there are south-facing cirques as wide as 7 kilometres (4.3 mi) surrounded by high cliffs. The ridges between the cirques stretch over 10 kilometres (6.2 mi) to the south, and in seven cases widen to form flat-topped buttes. In the north and northwest the range is made up of small table mountains and isolated peaks. There are fifteen table mountains in the south of the range, seven in the southwest and just three in the north.

== Glacial activity ==
The geology and origin of glacial erratics, and the evidence of subglacial erosion in the Shackleton Range show that the whole range was once overrun by ice from the south or southeast. The erratics were probably carried north from the Whichaway Nunataks and the Pensacola Mountains around the end of the Miocene during the last major expansion of the Antarctic ice sheet. The ice was 1,000 metres (3,300 ft) thicker than today, and the ice flowed north unaffected by the local landforms. During the Last Glacial Period, the Filchner ice shelf expanded and blocked the Slessor Glacier, which deposited till and scattered erratics.

Today, the ice in most of the range still flows north into the Slessor Glacier. However, ice from a small area in the southwest of the snowfield flows south between the Read Mountains and the Stephenson Bastion into the Recovery Glacier, and small glaciers carry ice south from the Read Mountains and Stephenson Bastion.

The high table mountains in the south, exposed to the prevailing winds, have been free of ice for longest and have experienced more weathering than the lower mountains to the north. The Read Mountains have probably been ice-free since before the Quaternary. With few exceptions the table top mountains are free of glacial deposits, although glacial striations and crescentic gouges show that they have been subject to glacial activity in the past. The assumption is that during the long ice-free period the deposits have been eroded away.

== Topographical Features ==
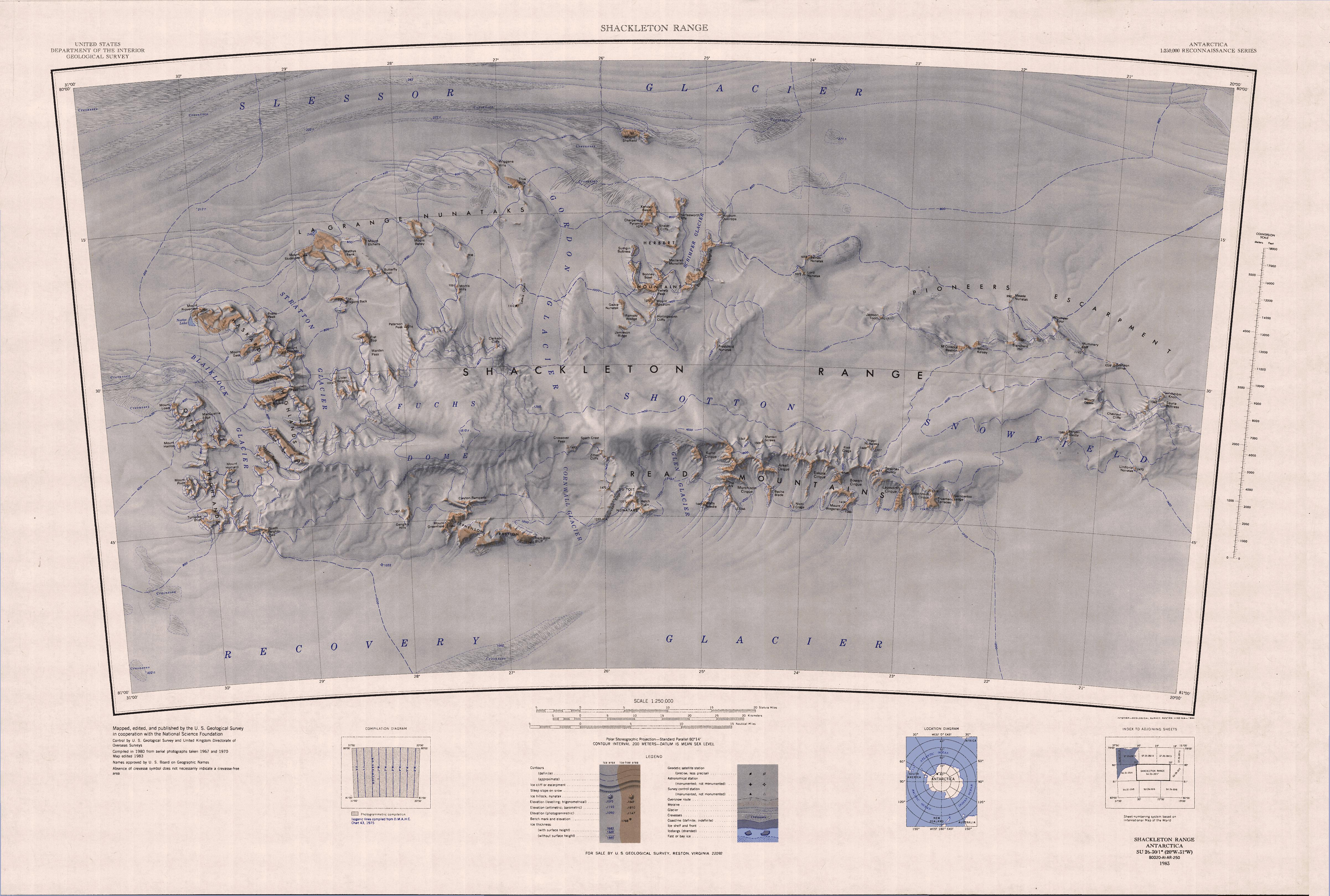
Shackleton Range USGS map 1983

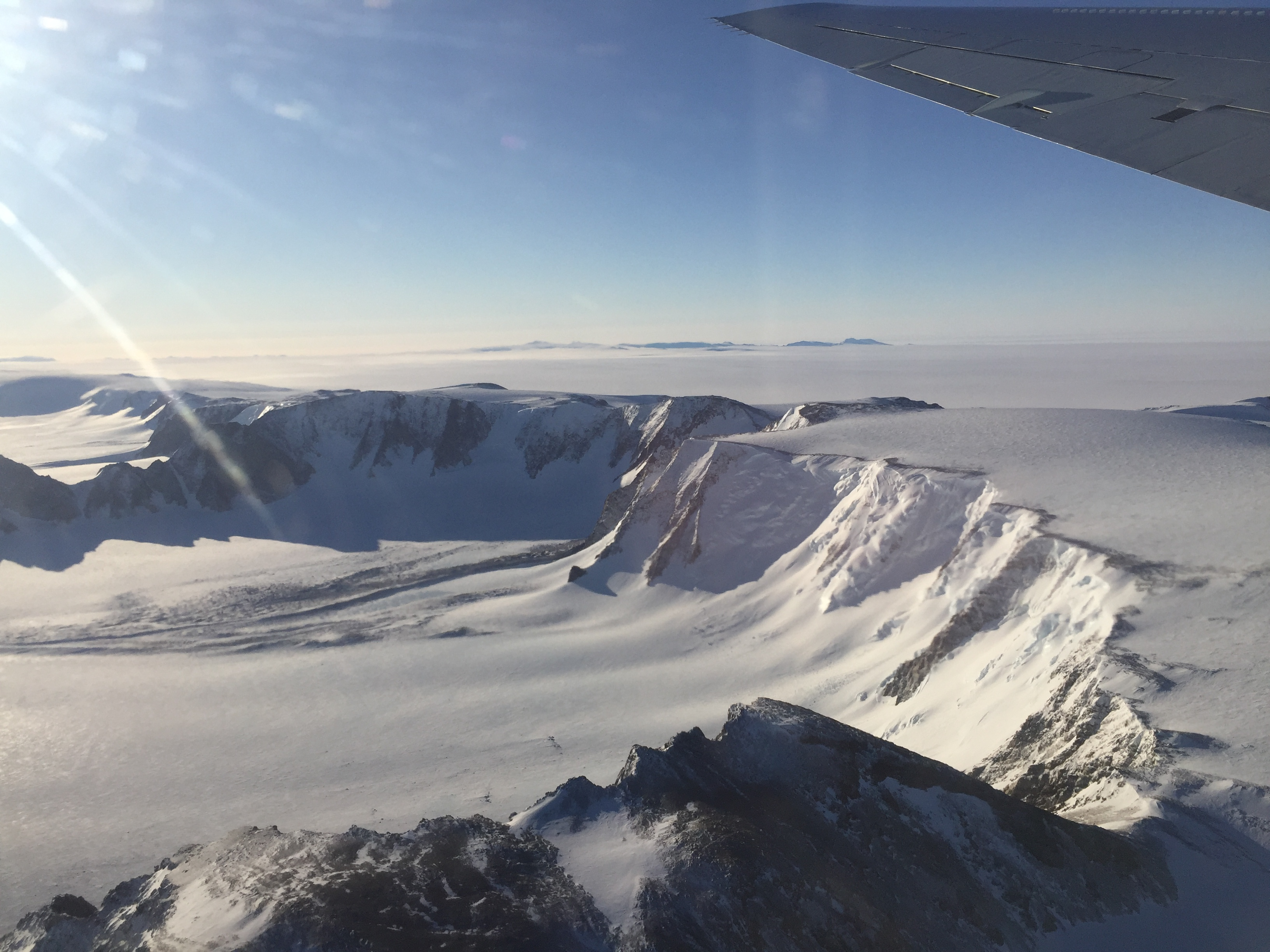
View from 24 October 2016 flight

In the interior of the range the Fuchs Dome is in the west part, from which the Shotton Snowfield extends to the east. The Otter Highlands are at the west end of the range between the Slessor and Recovery glaciers. Extending eastward along the north (Slessor) side of the range are the Haskard Highlands, La Grange Nunataks, Herbert Mountains and Pioneers Escarpment. From east to west along the south (Recovery) side of the range are the Read Mountains and Stephenson Bastion.

=== Fuchs Dome ===
Fuchs Dome (80°36′S 27°50′W) is a large ice-covered dome rising over 1,525 metres (5,000 ft), between Stratton Glacier and Gordon Glacier in the central part of the Shackleton Range, Antarctica. It was first mapped in 1957 by the Commonwealth Trans-Antarctic Expedition (CTAE) and named for Sir Vivian E. Fuchs, leader of the CTAE 1955–58.

=== Shotton Snowfield ===
80°35′S 23°15′W. A large snowfield between Herbert Mountains and Pioneers Escarpment on the north and Read Mountains on the south, in the Shackleton Range. The U.S. Navy obtained aerial photographs of the feature in 1967 and it was surveyed by BAS, 1968-71. Named by the UK-APC, 1971, in association with the names of glacial geologists grouped in this area, after Frederick W. Shotton (1906-90), British Quaternary geologist and Professor of Geology, University of Birmingham, 1949-74. Not: Shottonfonna.

=== Otter Highlands ===
Otter Highlands (80°38′S 30°0′W) is a group of peaks and ridges extending northwest-southeast for 17 nautical miles (31 km; 20 mi) from Mount Lowe to Wyeth Heights, located west of Blaiklock Glacier and forming the west end of the Shackleton Range. Surveyed by the Commonwealth Trans-Antarctic Expedition in 1957. Named by the United Kingdom Antarctic Place-Names Committee (UK-APC) in 1972 after the De Havilland Otter aircraft which supported the CTAE.

=== Haskard Highlands ===
The Haskard Highlands (80°30′S 29°15′W) are a range of peaks and ridges between Blaiklock Glacier and Stratton Glacier in the northwest of the Shackleton Range, Antarctica, rising to 1,210 metres (3,970 ft) at Mount Weston and including features between Mount Provender and Pointer Nunatak. The highlands were first mapped in 1957 by the Commonwealth Trans-Antarctic Expedition, and photographed from the air by the U.S. Navy in 1967. They were surveyed by the British Antarctic Survey between 1968 and 1971, and named by the UK Antarctic Place-Names Committee in 1971 after Sir Cosmo Haskard, Governor of the Falkland Islands 1964–70.

=== La Grange Nunataks ===
La Grange Nunataks (80°18′S 27°50′W) is a scattered group of nunataks extending west for 22 nautical miles (41 km) from the mouth of Gordon Glacier, on the north side of the Shackleton Range, Antarctica. They were first mapped in 1957 by the Commonwealth Trans-Antarctic Expedition (CTAE), and were photographed in 1967 by U.S. Navy aircraft. They were named by the UK Antarctic Place-Names Committee for Johannes J. La Grange, a South African meteorologist with the CTAE. Not: Beney Nunataks.

=== Herbert Mountains ===
The Herbert Mountains (80°20′S 25°30′W) are a conspicuous group of rock summits on the east side of Gordon Glacier in the Shackleton Range of Antarctica. They were first mapped in 1957 by the Commonwealth Trans-Antarctic Expedition and named for Sir Edwin S. Herbert, Chairman of the Finance Committee and a Member of the Committee of Management of the expedition, 1955–58.

=== Pioneers Escarpment ===
Pioneers Escarpment (80°28′S 21°7′W) is a mostly snow-covered north-facing escarpment, interrupted by occasional bluffs and spurs, between Slessor Glacier on the north and Shotton Snowfield on the south, in the Shackleton Range. The escarpment was photographed from the air by the U.S. Navy, 1967, and was surveyed by British Antarctic Survey (BAS), 1968–71. So named by United Kingdom Antarctic Place-Names Committee (UK-APC) because features on the escarpment are named after the pioneers whose inventions have assisted living and traveling conditions in the polar regions.

=== Read Mountains ===
Read Mountains' 80°42′S 24°45′W is a group of rocky summits, the highest Holmes Summit 1,875 metres (6,152 ft), lying east of Glen Glacier in the south-central part of the Shackleton Range. First mapped in 1957 by the Commonwealth Trans-Antarctic Expedition and named for Professor Herbert H. Read, Chairman of the Scientific Committee and member of the Committee of Management of the Commonwealth Trans-Antarctic Expedition, 1955–58.

=== Stephenson Bastion ===
Stephenson Bastion (80°46′S 27°12′W) is a mountain massif with steep rock cliffs on its south side, rising to 1,850 metres (6,070 ft) in the south-central part of the Shackleton Range. It was first mapped in 1957 by the Commonwealth Trans-Antarctic Expedition, and it was photographed by U.S. Navy aircraft in 1967. It was named by the United Kingdom Antarctic Place-Names Committee (UK-APC) for Philip J. Stephenson, an Australian geologist with the transpolar party of the CTAE in 1956–58.

== Glaciers ==
The range lies between the Slessor Glacier to the north and the Recovery Glacier to the south, both of which flow west into the Filchner–Ronne Ice Shelf. Slessor Glacier is about 50 kilometres (31 mi) wide and drops from an elevation of over 800 metres (2,600 ft) at the eastern end of the range to about 200 metres (660 ft) at the western end where it enters the Filchner ice shelf. This results in rapid flow, with areas of chaotic ice and many crevasses. The Recovery Glacier is about 80 kilometres (50 mi) wide, and drops from about 1,200 to 800 metres (3,900 to 2,600 ft) along the range. With a lower gradient it flows more slowly and has fewer crevasses. The Schimper Glacier, Gordon Glacier, Stratton Glacier and Blaiklock Glacier flow northwest from the range into the Slessor Glacier. The Glen Glacier and Cornwall Glacier flow south into the Recovery Glacier.

=== Recovery Glacier ===
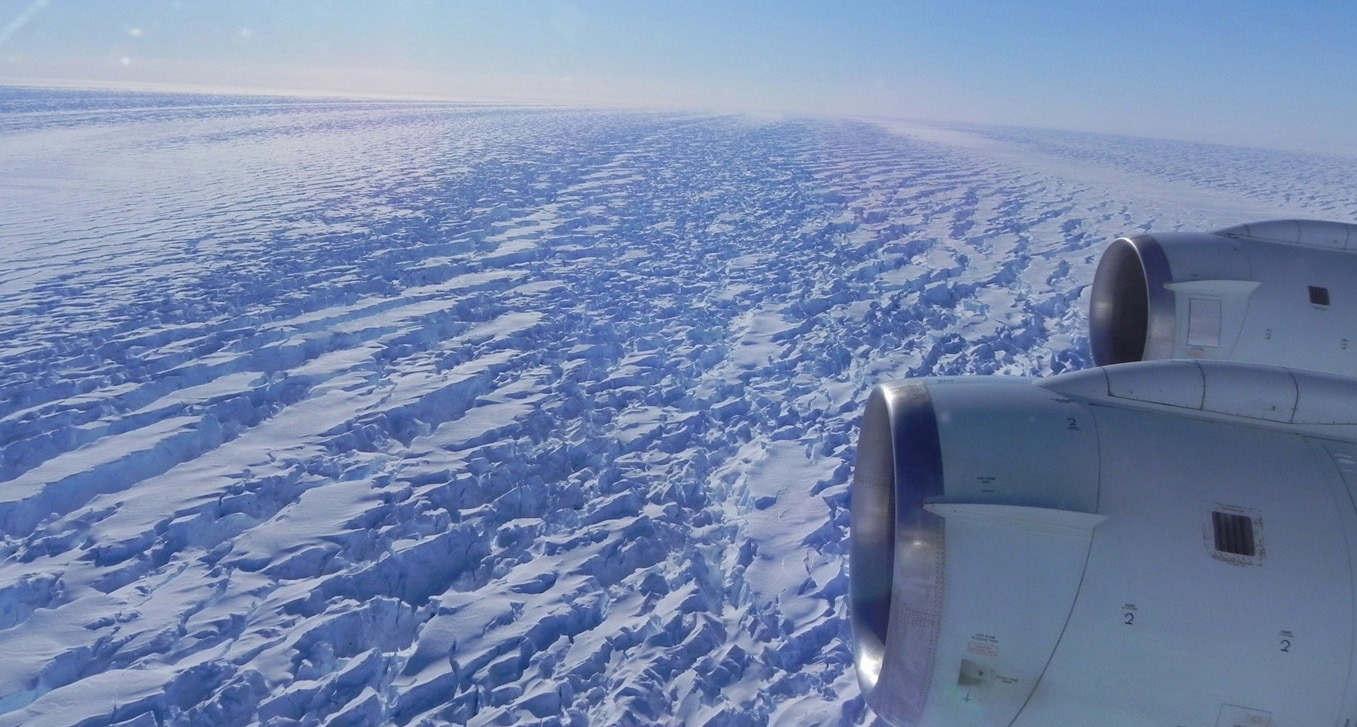
Ice stream of the Recovery Glacier from DC8

81°10′S 28°00′W. Glacier, at least 60 miles (97 km) long and 40 miles (64 km) wide at its mouth, flowing west along the south side of the Shackleton Range. First seen from the air and examined from the ground by the CTAF in 1957, and so named because of the recovery of the expedition's vehicles which repeatedly broke into bridged crevasses on this glacier during the early stages of the crossing of Antarctica. Not: Glaciar Expedicion Polar Argentina, Glaciar Falucho.

=== Slessor Glacier ===
79°50′S 28°30′W. Glacier at least 75 miles (121 km) long and 50 miles (80 km) wide, flowing west into the Filchner Ice Shelf to the north of the Shackleton Range. First seen from the air and mapped by the CTAE in 1956. Named by the CTAE for Marshal of the RAF Sir John Slessor, chairman of the expedition committee.

=== Glen Glacier ===
Glacier (80°44′S 25°16′W) at least 7 miles (11 km) long, flowing south in the Shackleton Range to join Recovery Glacier to the west of Read Mountains. First mapped in 1957 by the CTAE and named for Alexander R. Glen, member of the Committee of Management of the CTAE, 1955–58.

=== Cornwall Glacier ===
80°47′S 26°16′W. Glacier 9 miles (14 km) long, flowing south from Crossover Pass in the Shackleton Range to join Recovery Glacier east of Ram Bow Bluff. First mapped in 1957 by the CTAE and named for Gen. Sir James H. Marshall-Cornwall, member of the Committee of Management of the CTAE, 1955-58.

=== Schimper Glacier ===
80°18′S 25°05′W. A glacier in the east part of Herbert Mountains, Shackleton Range, flowing north-northeast into Slessor Glacier. Photographed from the air by the U.S. Navy, 1967, and surveyed by BAS, 1968-71. In association with the names of glacial geologists grouped in the area, named by the UK-APC after Karl Friedrich Schimper (1803–67), German botanist who in 1835 originated the theory of the Ice Age in Europe to account for the distribution of erratic boulders.

=== Gordon Glacier ===
80°17′S 26°09′W. Glacier at least 24 miles (39 km) long, flowing north from Crossover Pass through the Shackleton Range to join Slessor Glacier. First mapped in 1957 by the CTAE and named after George P. Pirie-Gordon, member of the Committee of Management and treasurer of the CTAE, 1955-58.

=== Stratton Glacier ===
80°22′S 29°00′W. A glacier 20 miles (32 km) long, flowing north from Pointer Nunatak and then northwest to the north of Mount Weston, in the Shackleton Range. First mapped in 1957 by the CTAE and named for David G. Stratton, surveyor and deputy leader of the transpolar party of the CTAE in 1956-58.

=== Blaiklock Glacier ===
80°30′S 29°51′W. Glacier 16 miles (26 km) long, flowing north from Turnpike Bluff, then northwest to Mounts Provender and Lowe in the west part of the Shackleton Range. First mapped in 1957 by the CTAE and named for Kenneth V. Blaiklock, leader of the advance party of the CTAE in 1955-56 and surveyor with the transpolar party in 1956-58.

== Other features ==
=== Crossover Pass ===
80°38′S 26°30′W. Pass between Gordon and Cornwall Glaciers in the central part of the Shackleton Range. First mapped in 1957 by the CTAE and so named because this pass, together with Gordon and Cornwall Glaciers, provides a sledging route across the Shackleton Range from north to south.

=== Warden Pass ===
80°28′S 28°20′W. A snow pass at c. 1,000 metres (3,300 ft) trending east-west between the northwest side of Fuchs Dome and Flat Top in the Shackleton Range. The area was surveyed by CTAE in 1957. Named by the UK-APC after Michael A. Warden, BAS general assistant, Halley Station, 1970-72, who worked in the area.

=== Nostoc Lake ===
80°24′S 30°05′W Lake lying 1 mile (1.6 km) southwest of Mount Provender in the west part of the Shackleton Range. First mapped in 1957 by the CTAE and given the generic name of the freshwater alga found growing in the lake.

== Sources ==
- Alberts, Fred G., ed. (1995), Geographic Names of the Antarctic (PDF) (2 ed.), United States Board on Geographic Names This article incorporates public domain material from websites or documents of the United States Board on Geographic Names.
- Höfle, Hans-Christian; Buggisch, Werner (1993), "Glacial Geology and Petrography of Erratics in the Shackleton Range, Antarctica" (PDF), Polarforschung, vol. 63, no. 213, pp. 183–201
- "Holmes Summit", SCAR Composite Gazetteer
- Laird, M.G. (1991), Thomson, M.R.A.; Crame, J.A.; Thomson, J.W. (eds.), Lower-mid-Palaeozoic sedimentation and tectonic patterns on the palaeo-Pacific margin of Antarctica, in Geological Evolution of Antarctica, Cambridge: Cambridge University Press, pp. 178–179, ISBN 9780521372664
- Shackleton Range, United States Geological Survey, 1983 This article incorporates public domain material from websites or documents of the United States Geological Survey.
- Skidmore, Michael J.; Clarkson, Peter D. (1972), "Physiography and Glacial Geomorphology of the Shackleton Range" (PDF), Antarctic Survey Bulletin, no. 30
- Will, Thomas; Zeh, A.; Gerdes, Axel; Frimmel, Hartwig; Millar, I.L.; Schmädicke, E. (2009), "Palaeoproterozoic to Palaeozoic magmatic and metamorphic events in the Shackleton Range, East Antarctica: Constraints from zircon and monazite dating, and implications for the amalgamation of Gondwana", Precambrian Research, doi:10.1016/j.precamres.2009.03.008
