= Recovery Glacier =

Glacier in Antarctica

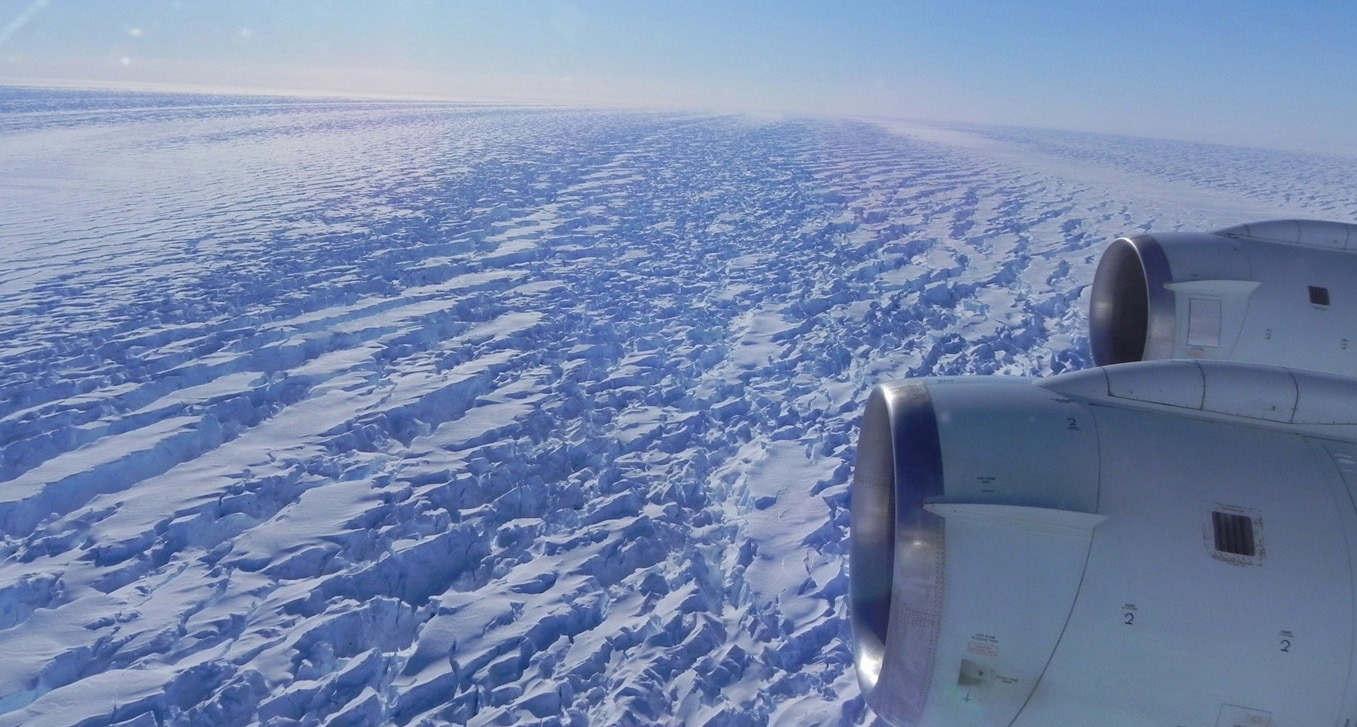
- Ice stream of Recovery Glacier

- Location within Antarctica
- Location: Coats Land
- Coordinates: 81°10′S 28°00′W
- Length: 60 nmi (111 km; 69 mi)
- Width: 40 nmi (74 km; 46 mi)
- Terminus: East Antarctic Ice Sheet

The Recovery Glacier (81°10′S 28°00′W) is a glacier, at least 60 nautical miles (110 km; 69 mi) long and 40 nautical miles (74 km; 46 mi) wide at its mouth, flowing west along the southern side of the Shackleton Range in Antarctica.

== Discovery and name ==
The Recovery Glacier was first seen from the air and examined from the ground by the Commonwealth Trans-Antarctic Expedition in 1957. It was so named because of the recovery of the expedition's vehicles which repeatedly broke into bridged crevasses on this glacier during the early stages of the crossing of Antarctica.

== Glaciology ==
Dana Floricioiu and Irena Hajnsek of the German Aerospace Centre spoke on the radar data showing the interior of the Recovery Glacier at the IEEE Geoscience and Remote Sensing Symposium in Cape Town, South Africa, in July 2009. The data comes from the German public-private satellite Terrasar-X and when combined with Radarsat-1 shows the changes in the glacier over 11 years.

== Features ==
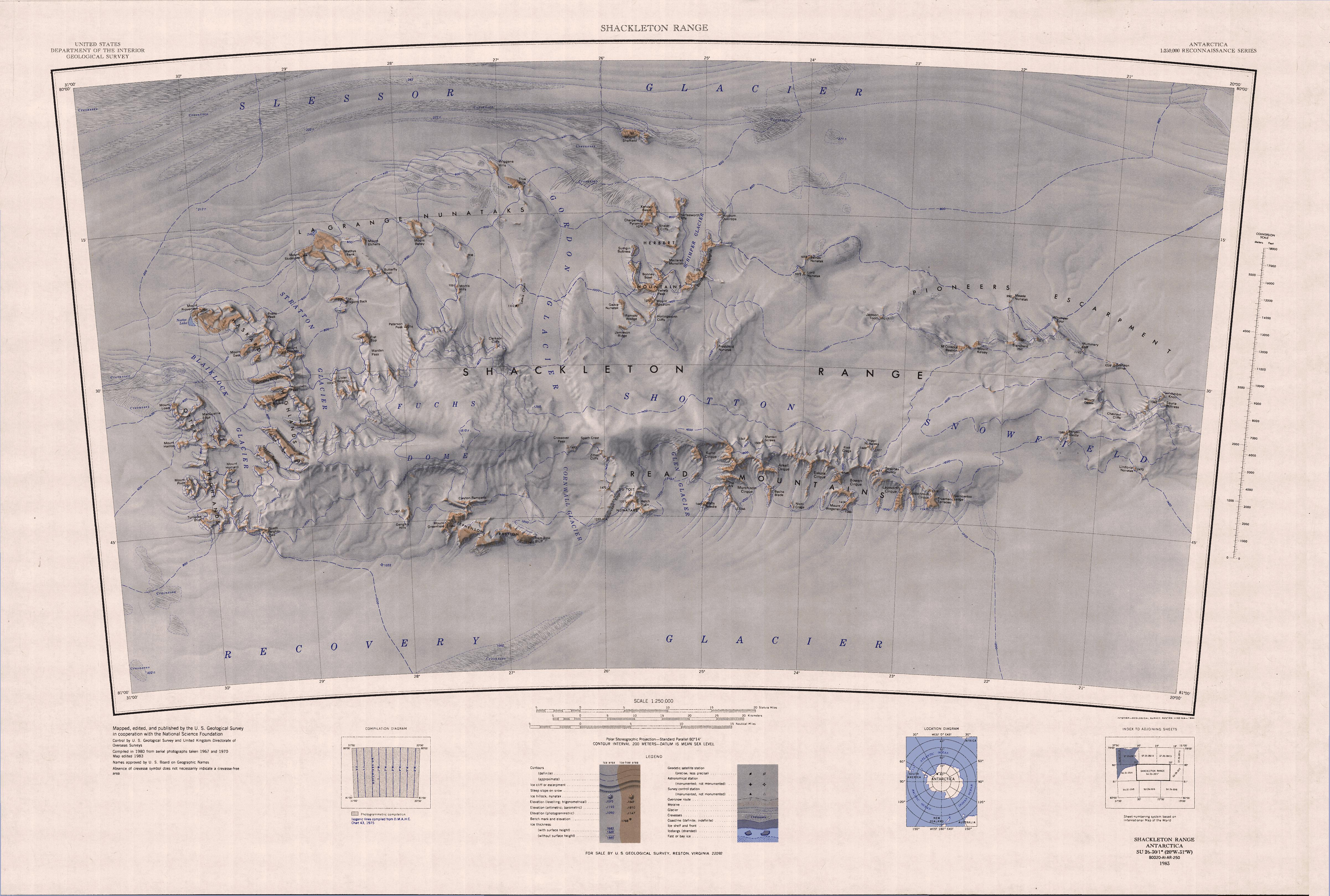
Shackleton Range, Recovery Glacier flow east–west along its south side

=== Recovery Ice Stream ===
This ice stream drains part of the East Antarctic Ice Sheet into the glacier. It is nearly 800 kilometres (500 mi) long and feeds the Filchner Ice Shelf over the Weddell Sea. The area contains four subglacial lakes. This causes the ice flow rate to vary dramatically, ranging between 2 and 50 meters per year. The ice stream drains about 35 billion tons of water and ice into the ocean each year. The entire East Antarctic ice sheet releases about 57 billion tons a year.

=== Glen Glacier ===
80°44′S 25°16′W. A glacier at least 7 nautical miles (13 km; 8.1 mi) long, flowing south in the Shackleton Range to join the Recovery Glacier to the west of the Read Mountains. First mapped in 1957 by the Commonwealth Trans-Antarctic Expedition (CTAE) and named for Alexander R. Glen, member of the Committee of Management of the CTAE, 1955–58.

=== Cornwall Glacier ===
80°47′S 26°16′W. A glacier 9 nautical miles (17 km; 10 mi) long, flowing south from Crossover Pass in the Shackleton Range to join Recovery Glacier east of Ram Bow Bluff. First mapped in 1957 by the CTAE and named for Gen. Sir James Marshall-Cornwall, member of the Committee of Management of the CTAE, 1955–58.

=== Blackwall Ice Stream ===
82.8666667°S 35.35°W. A slightly S-shaped ice stream about 240 nautical miles (440 km; 280 mi) long and 12 nautical miles (22 km; 14 mi) wide. It descends from about 1,900 metres (6,200 ft) high to 730 metres (2,400 ft) high where it joins Recovery Glacier between Argentina Range and Whichaway Nunataks. It was named after Hugh Blackwall Evans (1874–1975), Canadian naturalist with the British Antarctic Expedition, 1898–1900, led by Carsten Borchgrevink.

=== Whichaway Nunataks ===
81°33′S 28°30′W. A group of rocky nunataks extending for 7 nautical miles (13 km; 8.1 mi) and marking the south side of the mouth of Recovery Glacier. First seen from the air and visited in 1957 by the CTAE and so named because it was uncertain which route from the nunataks would lead furthest inland.

== Sources ==
- Alberts, Fred G., ed. (1995), Geographic Names of the Antarctic (PDF) (2 ed.), United States Board on Geographic Names This article incorporates public domain material from websites or documents of the United States Board on Geographic Names.
- Antarctic 'pole of ignorance' finally addressed, 15 December 2016
- "Blackwall Ice Stream", Geographic Names Information System, United States Geological Survey, United States Department of the Interior
- Sample, Ian (22 November 2009), "World's largest ice sheet melting faster than expected", The Guardian
- Scott, Michon, "The Role of Subglacial Lakes", National Aeronautics and Space Administration, Earth Observatory
- This article incorporates public domain material from websites or documents of the United States Geological Survey.
