= Frederick William Shotton =

British geologist

Professor Frederick William Shotton FRS (8 October 1906 – 21 July 1990) was a British geologist.

== Early life and career ==
Born in Exhall, near Coventry, the son of a manufacturer of drop forging products, Fred Shotton was educated at Bablake School and Sidney Sussex College, Cambridge, where he was awarded a first in both parts of the natural sciences tripos. Upon completing a Harkness Fellowship in 1929, he was appointed assistant lecturer at the University of Birmingham, where he remained until returning to Cambridge as a lecturer in 1936. During the war he served with the Middle East Force and the 21st Army Group, working on geological surveys in northern Africa and, later, in France and Belgium (see below). After demobilisation in 1945 he was appointed Sorby Professor of Geology at Sheffield University before returning to Birmingham four years later to take up the post of Lapworth Professor of Geology and head of the Geology department, remaining in situ until his retirement in 1974. He was also vice-principal of Birmingham University from 1965 to 1971. He was awarded the Prestwich Medal in 1954. Married twice, he latterly lived in Dorridge.

== Work during World War II ==
Shotton's research into the geological makeup of Normandy beaches helped allied commanders decide which were the best to use on D-Day. From May 1941 to September 1943, based in Egypt, he used hydrogeology to guide development of potable water supplies for British forces operational in the Middle East and northern Africa. From October 1943 he helped plan for the Allied liberation of Normandy by providing terrain evaluation (primarily through preparation of specialist maps and contribution of technical advice) relating to beach conditions, suitability of ground for the rapid construction of temporary airfields, and water supply. Following D-Day, 6 June 1944, he was based in northern France and later Belgium, and was involved with further water supply tasks, discussions on quarrying of aggregate, and assessment of soil conditions likely to influence off-road vehicle mobility or the siting of airfields and military depots, thus contributing to Allied victory in Europe in May 1945. He was appointed an MBE in recognition of his military geological work. Shotton's pioneering Quaternary research resulted in his election as a Fellow of the Royal Society.

== Ice Age Warwickshire Interpretation Panel and tribute to Fred Shotton ==
As part of an Aggregates Levy Sustainability Fund (ALSF) supported project, an interpretation board was installed on Wolston village green. It illustrates the environment that existed in the area about 500,000 years ago. The panel was designed by Jeff Jones of The Drawing Room in Leamington Spa and depicts 'Heidelberg Man' hunting his prey along the banks of the Bytham River. More detail is provided on the nature of some of the evidence - pollen, mammal remains and the fine artefacts found at Waverley Wood and Brandon. After recounting the story of the advance of the main Anglian ice sheet, the account concludes by highlighting the massive diversion of drainage caused by the ice. Many members of Fred Shotton's immediate family were present as the panel was unveiled by his daughter, Ann Black.
