= Stephenson Bastion =

Mountain in Antarctica

- Location within Antarctica

Highest point
- Elevation: 1,850 m (6,070 ft)
- Coordinates: 80°46′S 27°12′W

Geography
- Location: Coats Land, Antarctica
- Parent range: Shackleton Range

Stephenson Bastion (80°46′S 27°12′W) is a mountain massif with steep rock cliffs on its south side, rising to 1,850 metres (6,070 ft) in the south-central part of the Shackleton Range. It was first mapped in 1957 by the Commonwealth Trans-Antarctic Expedition, and it was photographed by U.S. Navy aircraft in 1967. It was named by the United Kingdom Antarctic Place-Names Committee (UK-APC) for Philip J. Stephenson, an Australian geologist with the transpolar party of the CTAE in 1956–58.

== Features ==
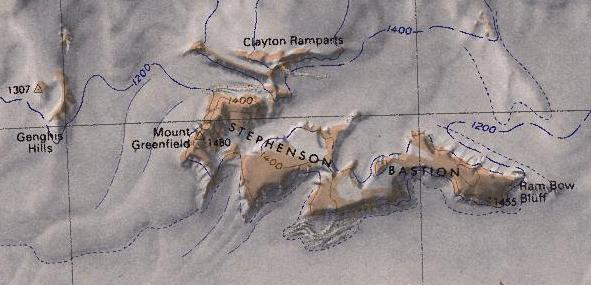
Stephenson Bastion and Ghengis Hills

Features of the massif that are named on the 1983 United States Geological Survey map are (west to east):

=== Mount Greenfield ===
80°46′S 27°36′W. Ice-free mountain rising to 1,490 metres (4,890 ft) and surmounting the west extremity of Stephenson Bastion in the Shackleton Range. Mapped in 1957 by the CTAE and named after George C. Greenfield, literary agent of the CTAE, 1955-58.

=== Clayton Ramparts ===
80°44′S 27°25′W. A line of east–west cliffs rising to over 1,600 metres (5,200 ft) at the south margin of Fuchs Dome, Shackleton Range. Surveyed by the CTAE, 1957, photographed from the air by the U.S. Navy, 1967, and further surveyed by BAS, 1968-71. Named by the UK-APC after Charles A. Clayton, BAS surveyor, Halley Station, 1969-71, who worked in the area.

=== Ram Bow Bluff ===
80°48′S 26°42′W. Prominent rock bluff on the east side of Stephenson Bastion in the south-central part of the Shackleton Range. First visited by the CTAE in 1957 and given this descriptive name because of the feature's resemblance to the ram bow of an old battleship.

== Sources ==
- Alberts, Fred G., ed. (1995), Geographic Names of the Antarctic (PDF) (2 ed.), United States Board on Geographic Names This article incorporates public domain material from websites or documents of the United States Board on Geographic Names.
- Shackleton Range, United States Geological Survey, 1983 This article incorporates public domain material from websites or documents of the United States Geological Survey.
