= Herbert Mountains =

Group of rock summits in Antarctica

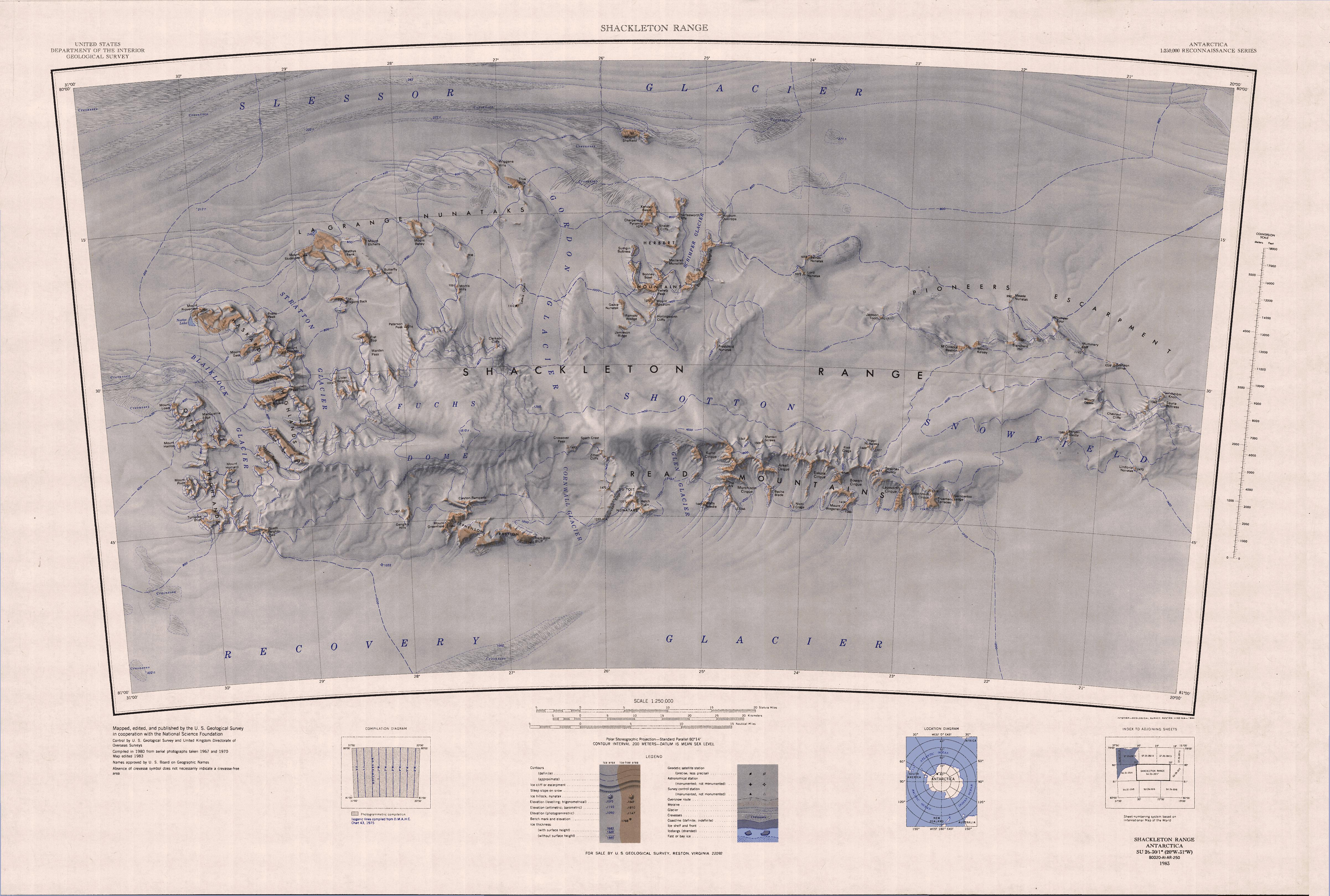
- Shackleton Range. Herbert Mountains in the center, north (top)

Geography
- Location within Antarctica
- Range coordinates: 80°20′S 25°30′W

The Herbert Mountains (80°20′S 25°30′W) are a conspicuous group of rock summits on the east side of Gordon Glacier in the Shackleton Range of Antarctica. They were first mapped in 1957 by the Commonwealth Trans-Antarctic Expedition and named for Sir Edwin S. Herbert, Chairman of the Finance Committee and a Member of the Committee of Management of the expedition, 1955–1958.

== Geology ==
Rocks in the Herbert Mountains include gneisses of migmatite and pyroxene-biotite, schists of garnet-kyanite and minor occurrences of quartzite, Marble and calc-silicates. There is post-tectonic basalt in Mount Sheffield that may be connected with from the Jurassic Ferrar Dolerite. The age of rock samples from the Sumgin Buttress very from c. 268 million years for fuchsite, quartz schist to c. 434 million years for whole rock and amphibolite. These dates may be understated due to the loss of radiogenic Argon-40.

== Features ==
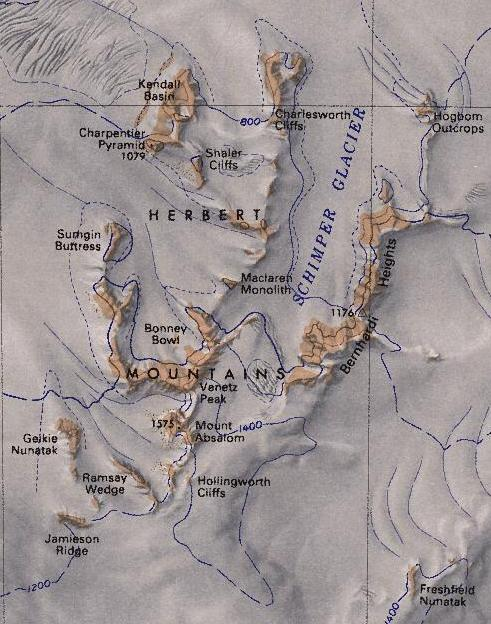
Herbert Mountains

Named geographical features on the 1983 United States Geological Survey map include:

=== Bernhardi Heights ===
80°20′S 25°00′W. A line of heights (1,220 metres (4,000 ft)), snow-covered to east but with a west-facing rock escarpment, rising east of Schimper Glacier in the Herbert Mountains, Shackleton Range. Photographed from the air by the U.S. Navy, 1967, and surveyed by BAS, 1968–71. In association with the names of glacial geologists grouped in this area, named by the UK-APC in 1971 after Reinhard Bernhardi, German geologist, who in 1832 first recognized the moraines and erratics of north Germany as evidence of a former south extension of the Arctic ice sheet.

=== Bonney Bowl ===
80°21′S 25°35′W. A cirque to the southeast of Sumgin Buttress in the west-central part of the Herbert Mountains, Shackleton Range. Photographed from the air by the U.S. Navy, 1967, and surveyed by BAS, 1968–71. In association with the names of glacial geologists grouped in this area, named by the UK-APC in 1971 after the Reverend Thomas G. Bonney (1833-1923), English geologist who worked on the origin of cirques; Professor of Geology, University College, London, 1877–1901.

=== Charlesworth Cliffs ===
80°14′S 25°18′W. A series of steep cliffs near the north end of the central ridge of Herbert Mountains, Shackleton Range. Photographed from the air by the U.S. Navy, 1967, and surveyed by the BAS, 1968–71. In association with the names of glacial geologists grouped in this area, named by the UK-APC after John K. Charlesworth (1889-1972), Irish geologist; Professor of Geology, Queens University, Belfast, 1921–54; author of The Quaternary Era, With Special Reference to its Glaciation, London, 1957.

=== Charpentier Pyramid ===
80°16′S 25°37′W. Pyramid-shaped peak rising to 1,080 metres (3,540 ft) in the northwest part of the Herbert Mountains, Shackleton Range, q.v. In association with the names of glacial geologists grouped in this area, named by the UK-APC in 1971 after Jean de (Hans von) Charpentier (1786-1855), Swiss engineer and mineralogist, who in 1835 gave additional proof on the former extension of glaciers.

=== Geikie Nunatak ===
80°24′S 25°52′W. A nunatak 3 miles (4.8 km) west of Mount Absalom in the southwest end of the Herbert Mountains, Shackleton Range. Photographed from the air by the U.S. Navy, 1967, and surveyed by the BAS, 1968–71. In association with the names of glacial geologists grouped in this area, named by the UK-APC in 1971 after James Geikie (1839-1915), Professor of Geology, Edinburgh University from 1882, who was one of the first to recognize that multiple glaciations occurred during the Pleistocene period.

=== Högbom Outcrops ===
80°15′S 24°52′W. Rocks rising to c. 1,000 metres (3,300 ft) at the east side of the terminus of Schimper Glacier in the Herbert Mountains, Shackleton Range. Photographed from the air by the U.S. Navy, 1967, and surveyed by BAS, 1968–71. In association with the names of glacial geologists grouped in this area, named in 1971 by the UK-APC after Arvid Gustaf Högbom (1857-1940), Swedish geologist who made important contributions to the glacial geology of northern Sweden.

=== Hollingworth Cliffs ===
80°26′S 25°33′W. A line of cliffs to the south of Mount Absalom in the Herbert Mountains, Shackleton Range. Photographed from the air by the U.S. Navy, 1967, and surveyed by BAS, 1968–71. In association with the names of glacial geologists grouped in this area, named by the UK-APC after Sydney E. Hollingworth (1899–1966), British geologist who specialized in the Pleistocene geology of NW England; Professor of Geology, University College, London University, 1946–66.

=== Jamieson Ridge ===
80°27′S 25°53′W. A narrow ridge 1 mile (1.6 km) long, rising to c. 1,200 metres (3,900 ft) at the southwest end of the Herbert Mountains, Shackleton Range. Photographed from the air by the U.S. Navy, 1967, and surveyed by BAS, 1968–71. In association with the names of glacial geologists grouped in this area, named by the UK-APC in 1971 after Thomas F. Jamieson (1829-1913), Scottish geologist whose work on the ice-worn rocks of Scotland developed the true origin of glacial striae in 1862; originator of the theory of isostasy in 1865.

=== Kendall Basin ===
80°15′S 25°39′W. An ice-free cirque at the northwest end of the Herbert Mountains, Shackleton Range. Photographed from the air by the U.S. Navy, 1967, and surveyed by BAS, 1968–71. In association with the names of glacial geologists grouped in this area, named by the UK-APC in 1971 after Percy Fry Kendall (1856–1936), English glacial geologist; sometime Professor of Geology, Leeds University.

=== Maclaren Monolith ===
80°20′S 25°23′W. A peak rising to c. 1,000 metres (3,300 ft) on the central ridge of Herbert Mountains, Shackleton Range. The feature is notable for a monolith forming the summit. Photographed from the air by the U.S. Navy, 1967, and surveyed by the BAS, 1968–71. In association with the names of glacial geologists grouped in this area, named by the UK-APC in 1971 after Charles Maclaren (1782-1866), Scottish naturalist who in 1842 was the first to recognize the glacial control of sea level.

=== Mount Absalom ===
80°24′S 25°24′W. Southernmost and highest (1,640 metres (5,380 ft)) mountain of the Herbert Mountains, in the central part of the Shackleton Range. First mapped in 1957 by the CTAE and named for Henry W. L. Absalom, member of the Scientific Committee on the CTAE, 1955–58.

=== Ramsay Wedge ===
80°26′S 25°43′W. A narrow rock spur, 2 miles (3.2 km) long, with talus slopes rising to c. 1,200 metres (3,900 ft), located 2 miles (3.2 km) southwest of Mount Absalom in the southwest portion of the Herbert Mountains, Shackleton Range. Photographed from the air by the U.S. Navy, 1967, and surveyed by BAS, 1968–71. In association with the names of glacial geologists grouped in this area, named by the UK-APC after Sir Andrew C. Ramsay (1814–91), Scottish geologist who first recognized the glacial origin of rock basins in 1862; Director-General, Geological Survey of Great Britain, 1871–81.

=== Shaler Cliffs ===
80°17′S 25°29′W. Rock cliffs 2 miles (3.2 km) east-southeast of Charpentier Pyramid, rising to 1,000 metres (3,300 ft) in the north part of Herbert Mountains, Shackleton Range. Photographed from the air by the U.S. Navy, 1967, and surveyed by BAS, 1968–71. In association with the names of glacial geologists grouped in this area, named by the UK-APC after Nathaniel S. Shaler (1841-1906), American geologist, joint author with geographer William Morris Davis of Glaciers (Boston, 1881) and of papers on glacial geology, 1884–92.

=== Mount Sheffield ===
80°10′S 25°42′W. Rocky mountain, 915 metres (3,002 ft), at the junction of Gordon and Slessor Glaciers on the north side of the Shackleton Range. First mapped in 1957 by the CTAE and named for Alfred H. Sheffield, chairman of the radio communications working group for the IGY, who was of great assistance in this field to the CTAE, 1955–58.

=== Sumgin Buttress ===
80°18′S 25°44′W. A prominent elevated rock mass 2.5 miles (4.0 km) southwest SW of Charpentier Pyramid, rising to c. 1,100 metres (3,600 ft) on the west side of Herbert Mountains, Shackleton Range. It was roughly surveyed by the CTAE, 1957, photographed from the air by the U.S. Navy, 1967, and resurveyed by BAS, 1968–71. In association with the names of glacial geologists grouped in this area, named by the UK-APC in 1971 after Mikhail I. Sumgin (1873–1942), Russian pioneer in permafrost research.

=== Venetz Peak ===
80°23′S 25°30′W. A peak rising to c. 1,500 metres (4,900 ft) and surmounting the southeast rim of Bonney Bowl in the Herbert Mountains, Shackleton Range. Photographed from the air by the U.S. Navy, 1967, and surveyed by BAS, 1968–71. In association with the names of glacial geologists grouped in this area, named by the UK-APC in 1971 after Ignaz Venetz-Sitten (known as Venetz, 1788–1859), Swiss engineer and glacial geologist who, in 1821, first expressed in detail the idea that Alpine glaciers were formerly much more extensive.

== Sources ==
- Alberts, Fred G., ed. (1995), Geographic Names of the Antarctic (PDF) (2 ed.), United States Board on Geographic Names This article incorporates public domain material from websites or documents of the United States Board on Geographic Names.
- Faure, Gunter; Mensing, Teresa M. (2010), The Transantarctic Mountains: Rocks, Ice, Meteorites and Water
- Shackleton Range, United States Geological Survey, 1983 This article incorporates public domain material from websites or documents of the United States Geological Survey.
