= Slessor Glacier =

Glacier in Antarctica

- Location within Antarctica
- Location: Coats Land
- Coordinates: 79°50′S 28°30′W
- Length: 75 nmi (139 km; 86 mi)
- Width: 50 nmi (93 km; 58 mi)
- Thickness: unknown
- Terminus: Filchner-Ronne Ice Shelf
- Status: unknown

The Slessor Glacier is a glacier at least 140 km (75 nmi) long and 90 km (50 nmi) wide, flowing west into the Filchner Ice Shelf to the north of the Shackleton Range. First seen from the air and mapped by the Commonwealth Trans-Antarctic Expedition (CTAE) in 1956. Named by the CTAE for RAF Marshal Sir John Slessor, chairman of the expedition committee.

== See also ==
- Ice stream
- List of glaciers in the Antarctic
- List of Antarctic ice streams
- Glaciology
