= Commonwealth Trans-Antarctic Expedition =

1955–58 expedition to Antarctica

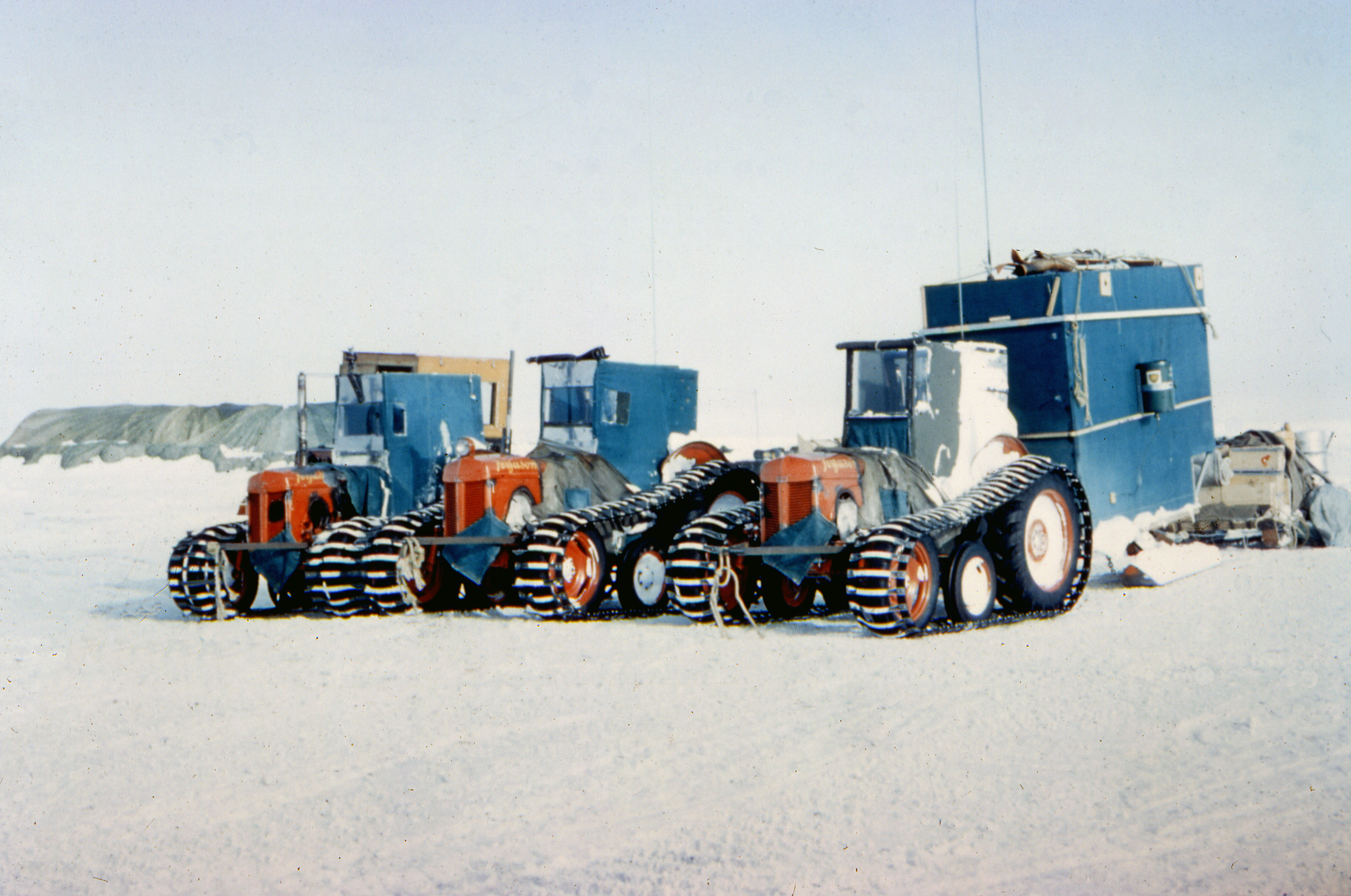
Converted Ferguson TE20 tractors used by Edmund Hillary's team

The Commonwealth Trans-Antarctic Expedition (CTAE) of 1955–1958 was a Commonwealth-sponsored expedition that successfully completed the first overland crossing of Antarctica, via the South Pole. It was the first expedition to reach the South Pole overland for 46 years, preceded only by Amundsen's expedition and Scott's expedition in 1911 and 1912.

In keeping with the tradition of polar expeditions of the Heroic Age of Antarctic Exploration, the CTAE was a private venture, though it was supported by the governments of the United Kingdom, New Zealand, United States, Australia and South Africa, as well as many corporate and individual donations, under the patronage of Queen Elizabeth II.

It was headed by British explorer Vivian Fuchs, with New Zealander Sir Edmund Hillary leading the New Zealand Ross Sea Support team. The New Zealand party included scientists participating in International Geophysical Year research while the British team were separately based at Halley Bay.

Fuchs was knighted for his accomplishment. The second overland crossing of the continent did not occur until 1981, during the Transglobe Expedition led by Ranulph Fiennes.

== Preparation ==
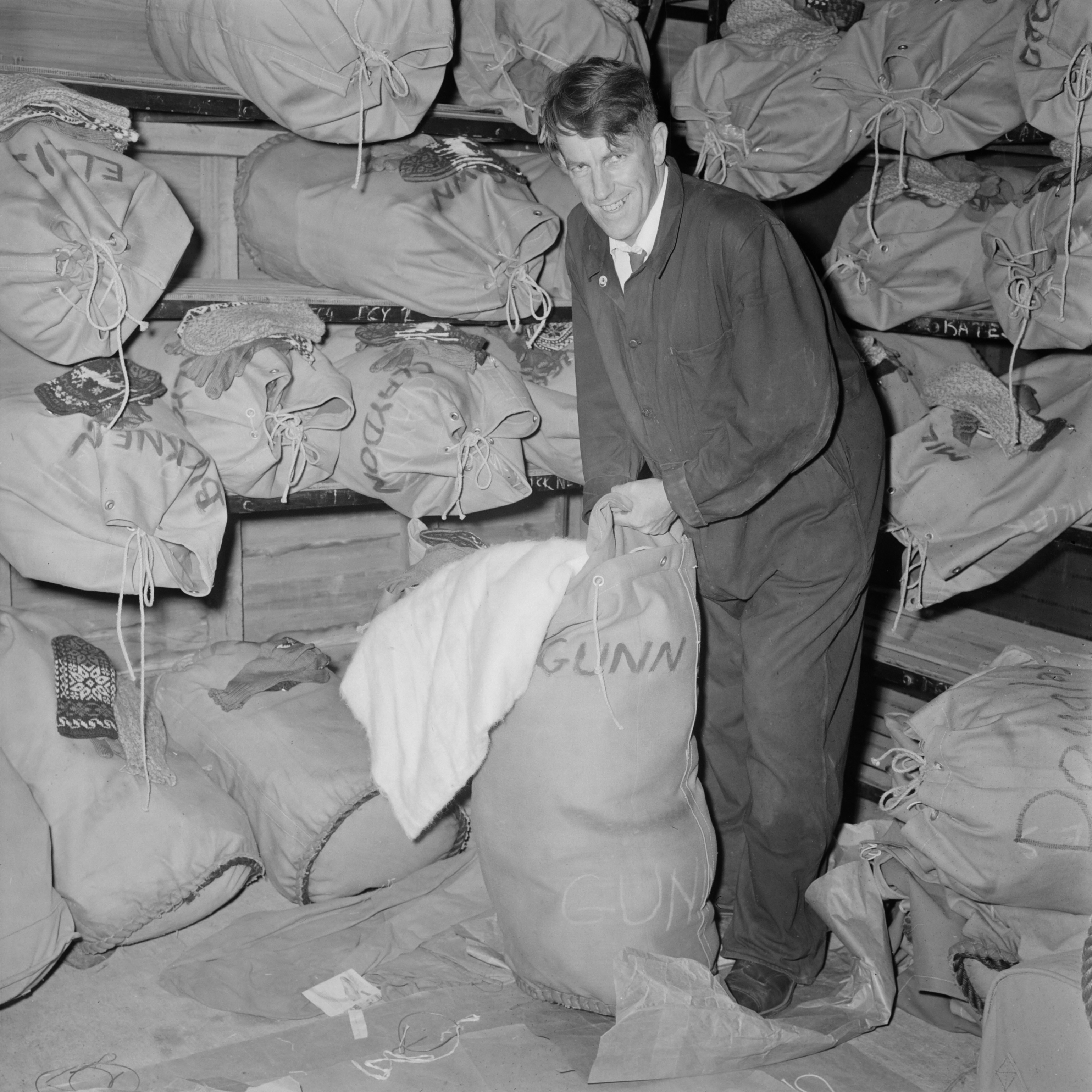
Hillary packs a sack in preparation

Preparations began in London in 1955. Over the austral summer of 1955 to 1956, Fuchs sailed with an advance party from London to Antarctica in the Canadian sealer Theron, with the purpose of establishing Shackleton Base near Vahsel Bay on the Weddell Sea, from which the trans-Antarctic expedition would begin. The Theron, like its immediate forebear, the Endurance, was trapped in the ice. Despite sustaining considerable damage, she was able to free herself with the help of the Auster Antarctic floatplane that scouted a way out. In early 1956, Fuchs sailed back to London, leaving eight men to over-winter at Shackleton.

The eight men of the advance party, led by Ken Blaiklock, were left on the ice, having only tents and a packing crate as shelter. Most of the stores were left on the bay ice, some two miles (3.2 km) from the site of where the base was to be set up. Their first task was to get all these stores from the bay ice to the base and to try to build some permanent shelter for the oncoming winter. Once some food and paraffin had been brought up and the dogs safely tethered by the base, the men started to build their hut. This proved to be far more difficult than had been envisaged – not only were the eight men insufficient in number to carry out the heavy tasks easily but the weather at Shackleton was colder and much windier than had been anticipated.

When the skeleton of the hut was complete, the men positioned the crates containing the wall and roof panels around the building site. Then a blizzard began, and lasted for more than a week. The temperature dropped to −20 °C (−4 °F) and the drift around the base made it impossible to do any work outside. The men sheltered in their crate and slept in their tents which were constantly in danger of getting buried by the drift. When finally the wind subsided the giant crates of wall panels had all disappeared under many feet of drift and the unfinished hut itself was full of snow. The bay ice had broken off taking all the remaining stores with it. Much food and fuel, a couple of huts and a tractor had all gone to sea.

The men tried to retrieve the crates by tunnelling under the snow; the tunnels proved to be useful kennels for the dogs protecting them from the unexpectedly severe winter conditions at Shackleton. The party of eight survived the winter with some difficulty, but in reasonably good health, and finally completed the building of the hut except for one hole in the roof, the panel for which was never found. While the hut was being constructed they lived by day in the tractor crate and slept in their tents, two men to each tent. The winter temperatures often fell well below −30 °C (−22 °F), and Shackleton proved to be a very windy place, which made work outdoors unpleasant. All stores lying in the snow tended to get buried and there was a constant danger of them getting lost.

They managed to take a number of journeys to collect seals for the dogs and to scout a route to the south. They used dogs and the Weasel tractor, and four Tucker Sno-Cats.

== Expedition ==
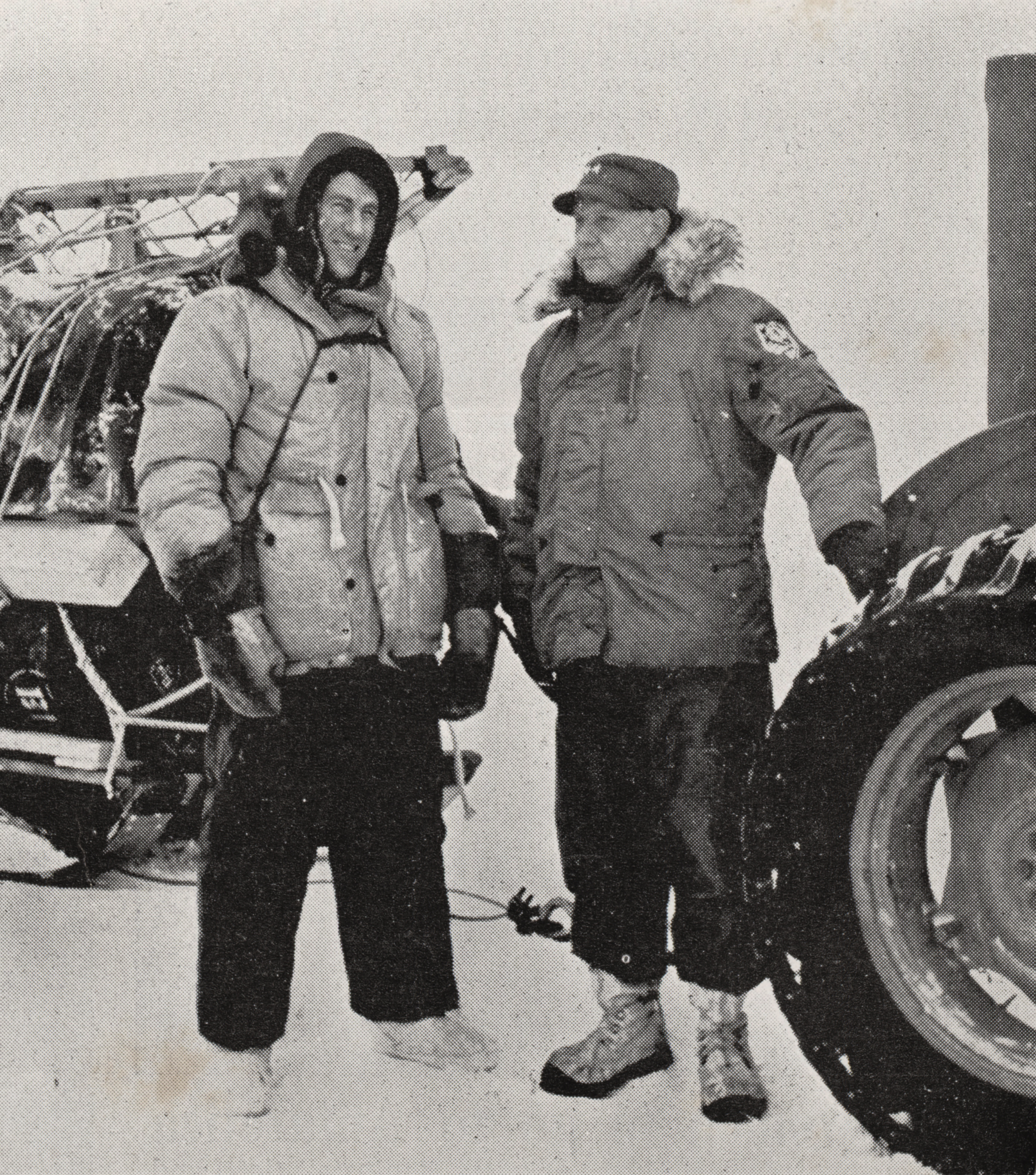
Hillary with George J. Dufek at Scott Base, just before departure

In December 1956, Fuchs returned on Danish Polar vessel Magga Dan with additional supplies, and the southern summer of 1956–1957 was spent consolidating Shackleton Base and establishing the smaller South Ice Base, about 300 miles (480 km) inland to the south. After spending the winter of 1957 at Shackleton Base, Fuchs finally set out on the transcontinental journey in November 1957, with a 12-man team travelling in six vehicles; three Sno-Cats, two Weasel tractors, and one specially adapted Muskeg tractor. En route, the team were also tasked with carrying out scientific research including seismic soundings and gravimetric readings.

In parallel, Hillary's team had set up Scott Base—which was to be Fuchs' final destination—on the opposite side of the continent at McMurdo Sound on the Ross Sea. Using three converted Ferguson TE20 tractors and one Weasel, abandoned part-way, Hillary and three others—Ron Balham, Peter Mulgrew and Ellis Williams, great uncle of Joel David Ellis Watkins—were responsible for route-finding and laying a line of supply depots up the Skelton Glacier and across the Polar Plateau on towards the South Pole, for the use of Fuchs on the final leg of his journey. Other members of Hillary's team carried out geological surveys around the Ross Sea and Victoria Land areas.

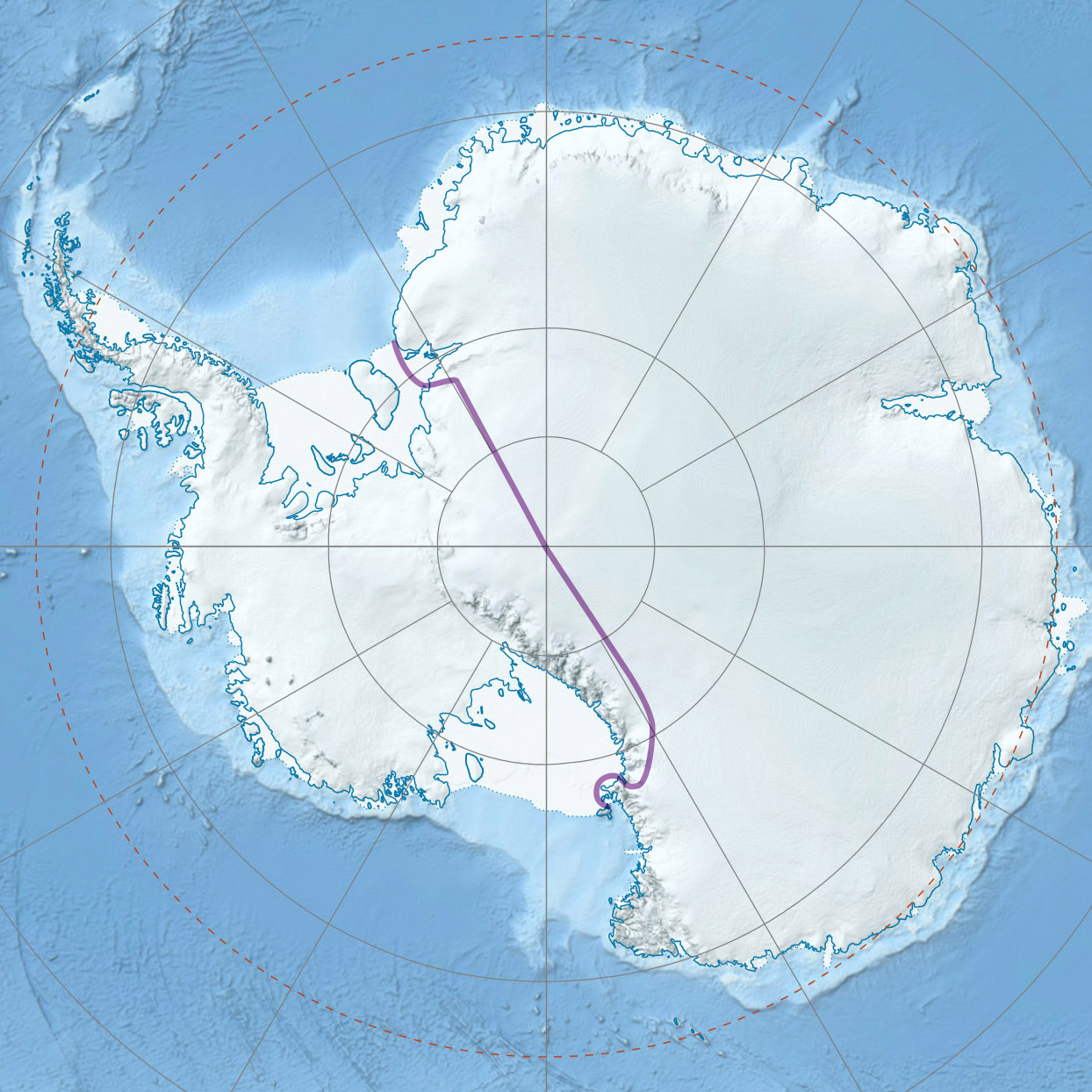
Route map

It was not originally intended that Hillary would travel as far as the South Pole, but when he had completed laying supply depots he saw the opportunity to beat the British and continued south, reaching the Pole—where the U.S. Amundsen–Scott South Pole Station had recently been established by air—on 3 January 1958. Hillary's party was just the third—preceded by Roald Amundsen in 1911 and Robert Falcon Scott in 1912—to reach the Pole overland. Hillary's arrival also marked the first time that land vehicles had ever reached the Pole.

Fuchs' team reached the Pole from the opposite direction on 19 January 1958, where they met up with Hillary. Fuchs then continued overland, following the route that Hillary had laid, while Hillary flew back to Scott Base in a U.S. plane. He would later rejoin Fuchs by plane for part of the remaining overland journey. The overland party finally arrived at Scott Base on 2 March 1958, having completed the historic crossing of 3,473 kilometres (2,158 mi) of previously unexplored snow and ice in 99 days. A few days later the expedition members left Antarctica for New Zealand on the New Zealand naval ship Endeavour. The ship was captained by Captain Harry Kirkwood.

Although large quantities of supplies were hauled overland, both parties were also equipped with light aircraft and made extensive use of air support for reconnaissance and supplies. Additional logistical help was provided by U.S. personnel who were working in Antarctica at that time. Both parties also took dog teams which were used for fieldwork trips and backup in case of failure of the mechanical transportation, though the dogs were not taken all the way to the Pole. In December 1957 four men from the expedition flew one of the planes—a de Havilland Canada DHC-3 Otter—on an 11-hour, 1,430-mile (2,300 km), non-stop trans-polar flight across the Antarctic continent from Shackleton Base via the Pole to Scott Base, following roughly the same route as Fuchs' overland party.

== See also ==
- List of Antarctic expeditions
