= Charlesworth (surname) =

Charlesworth is a surname that derives from Charlesworth in Derbyshire, England. Notable people with the surname include:

- Alan Charlesworth (1903–1978), Australian military officer
- Albany Charlesworth (1854–1914), British politician
- Albert Charlesworth (1865–1926), English cricketer
- Alfred Charlesworth (1865–1928), English cricketer
- Arnold Charlesworth (1930–1972), English footballer
- Arthur Charlesworth (1898–1966), English footballer
- Barry Charlesworth, rugby league player
- Ben Charlesworth (born 2000), English cricketer
- Brent Charlesworth (born 1942), British politician
- Brian Charlesworth (born 1945), British evolutionary biologist
- Bruce Charlesworth (born 1950), American visual artist
- Chris Charlesworth, British music journalist
- Christine Charlesworth (born 1949), English sculptor
- Clifford E. Charlesworth (1931–1991), NASA Flight Director
- Crowther Charlesworth (1875–1953), English cricketer
- David Charlesworth (born 1951), English Catholic abbot
- Deborah Charlesworth (born 1943), British evolutionary biologist
- Dick Charlesworth (1932–2008), jazz musician
- Dorothy Charlesworth (1927–1981), British archaeologist
- Edward Charlesworth (1813–1893), English geologist and palaeontologist
- Edward Parker Charlesworth (1783–1853), English physician
- Florence L. Barclay née Charlesworth (1862–1921), English novelist
- Graham Charlesworth (born 1965), English cricketer
- Hector Charlesworth (1872–1945), Canadian writer, editor, and critic
- Hilary Charlesworth (born 1955), Australian feminist and international law scholar
- Jack Charlesworth (footballer) (1895–1960), Australian rules footballer
- James H. Charlesworth (born 1940), American academic
- John Charlesworth (1902–1962), American football player
- John Charlesworth (1815–1880) British colliery owner and politician
- John Kaye Charlesworth (1889–1972), British geologist
- Jonathon Charlesworth, Australian field hockey player
- Kate Charlesworth (born 1950), British cartoonist
- Lester Charlesworth (1916–1980), Australian cricketer
- Luke Charlesworth (born 1992), New Zealand badminton player
- Luke Charlesworth (cricketer) (born 2003), English cricketer
- Maria Louisa Charlesworth (1819–1880), English children's writer
- Martin Charlesworth (1895–1950), English classical scholar
- Maud Ballington Booth née Charlesworth (1865–1948), Salvation Army leader and co-founder of the Volunteers of America
- Max Charlesworth (1925–2014), Australian philosopher and intellectual
- Michelle Charlesworth (born 1970), American television news reporter
- Natalie Charlesworth, Australian judge
- Ric Charlesworth (born 1952), Australian cricketer and field hockey player and coach
- Richard Charlesworth (swimmer) (born 1988), English swimmer
- Sarah Charlesworth (1947–2013), American conceptual artist and photographer
- Sarah Charlesworth (actress), Canadian actress
- Sian Charlesworth (born 1987), English singer
- Stan Charlesworth, English footballer
- Todd Charlesworth (born 1965), Canadian ice hockey player
- Violet Charlesworth (1884–?), British fraudster
