= Baines Nunatak =

Nunatak in Coats Land, Antarctica

- Location within Antarctica

Highest point
- Elevation: 1,020 m (3,350 ft)
- Coordinates: 80°19′S 23°58′W

Naming
- Etymology: Named after Thomas Baines

Geography
- Location: Antarctica

Baines Nunatak is a nunatak rising to 1,020 metres (3,350 ft) to the east of Bernhardi Heights and 10 nautical miles (19 km) northwest of Jackson Tooth, Pioneers Escarpment, in the Shackleton Range. It was photographed from the air by the U.S. Navy, 1967, surveyed by the British Antarctic Survey, 1968–71, and named in 1977 by the UK Antarctic Place-Names Committee after Thomas Baines (1822–75), an English explorer and joint author, with William Barry Lord, of Shifts and Expedients of Camp Life, Travel and Exploration (London, 1871).
