= Charlesworth =

Charlesworth may refer to:

== Places ==
- Charlesworth, Derbyshire, England
- Charlesworth, Edmonton, Canada

== People ==
- Charlesworth (surname), including a list of people with the surname
- Charlesworth Samuel (died 1980), Antiguan politician

== Other uses ==
- Charlesworth Bodies, coachbuilders of Coventry, England
- Charlesworth Cliffs, cliffs of Coats Land, Antarctica
- Charlesworth (TV series), a British television series broadcast in 1959
