= Lord Nunatak =

Place in Antarctica

Lord Nunatak (80°21′S 24°1′W) is a nunatak 1.5 nautical miles (3 km) southwest of Baines Nunatak, midway between the Herbert Mountains and Pioneers Escarpment in the Shackleton Range, Antarctica. It was photographed from the air by the U.S. Navy, 1967, and surveyed by the British Antarctic Survey, 1968–71. In association with the names of pioneers of polar life and travel grouped in this area, it was named by the UK Antarctic Place-Names Committee in 1971 after William B. Lord, a Canadian artilleryman and joint author with Thomas Baines of Shifts and Expedients of Camp Life, Travel and Exploration, London, 1871.
