= Schimper Glacier =

Glacier in Antarctica

- Location within Antarctica
- Location: Coats Land
- Coordinates: 81°18′S 25°5′W
- Thickness: unknown
- Terminus: Slessor Glacier
- Status: unknown

Schimper Glacier (80°18′S 25°5′W) is a glacier in the eastern part of Herbert Mountains, Shackleton Range, flowing north-northeast into Slessor Glacier.

== Exploration ==
The glacier was photographed from the air by the U.S. Navy, 1967, and surveyed by British Antarctic Survey (BAS), 1968–71. In association with the names of glacial geologists grouped in the area, named by the United Kingdom Antarctic Place-Names Committee (UK-APC) after Karl Friedrich Schimper (1803–67), German botanist who in 1835 originated the theory of the Ice Age in Europe to account for the distribution of erratic boulders.

== Location ==
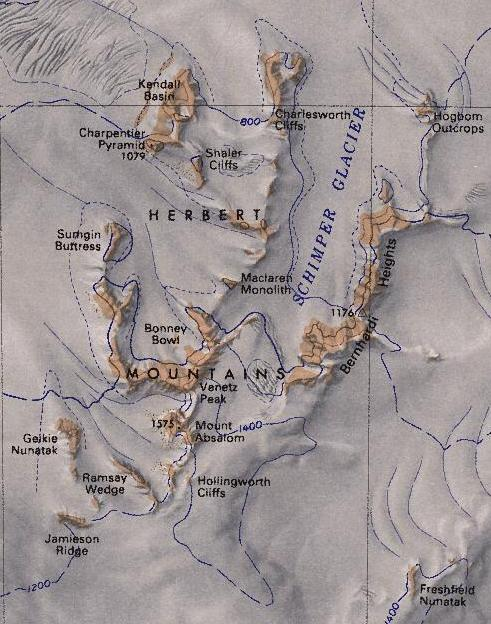
Herbert Mountains

The glacier forms in the south of the Herbert Mountains and flows north to enter the Slessor Glacier between the Högbom Outcrops to the east and the Charlesworth Cliffs to the west. The glacier flows along a fault line from near Mount Absalom, and divides the mountains into two, with the Bernhardi Heights ridge to the east falling steeply about 400 metres (1,300 ft) to the glacier.

== See also ==
- List of glaciers in the Antarctic
- Glaciology

== Sources ==
- Alberts, Fred G., ed. (1995), Geographic Names of the Antarctic (PDF) (2 ed.), United States Board on Geographic Names This article incorporates public domain material from websites or documents of the United States Board on Geographic Names.
- Höfle, Hans-Christian; Buggisch, Werner (1993), "Glacial Geology and Petrography of Erratics in the Shackleton Range, Antarctica" (PDF), Polarforschung, vol. 63, no. 213, pp. 183–201
- Shackleton Range, United States Geological Survey, 1983 This article incorporates public domain material from websites or documents of the United States Geological Survey.
- Skidmore, Michael J.; Clarkson, Peter D. (1972), "Physiography and Glacial Geomorphology of the Shackleton Range" (PDF), Antarctic Survey Bulletin, no. 30
