= Robert Gardiner Hill =

British surgeon

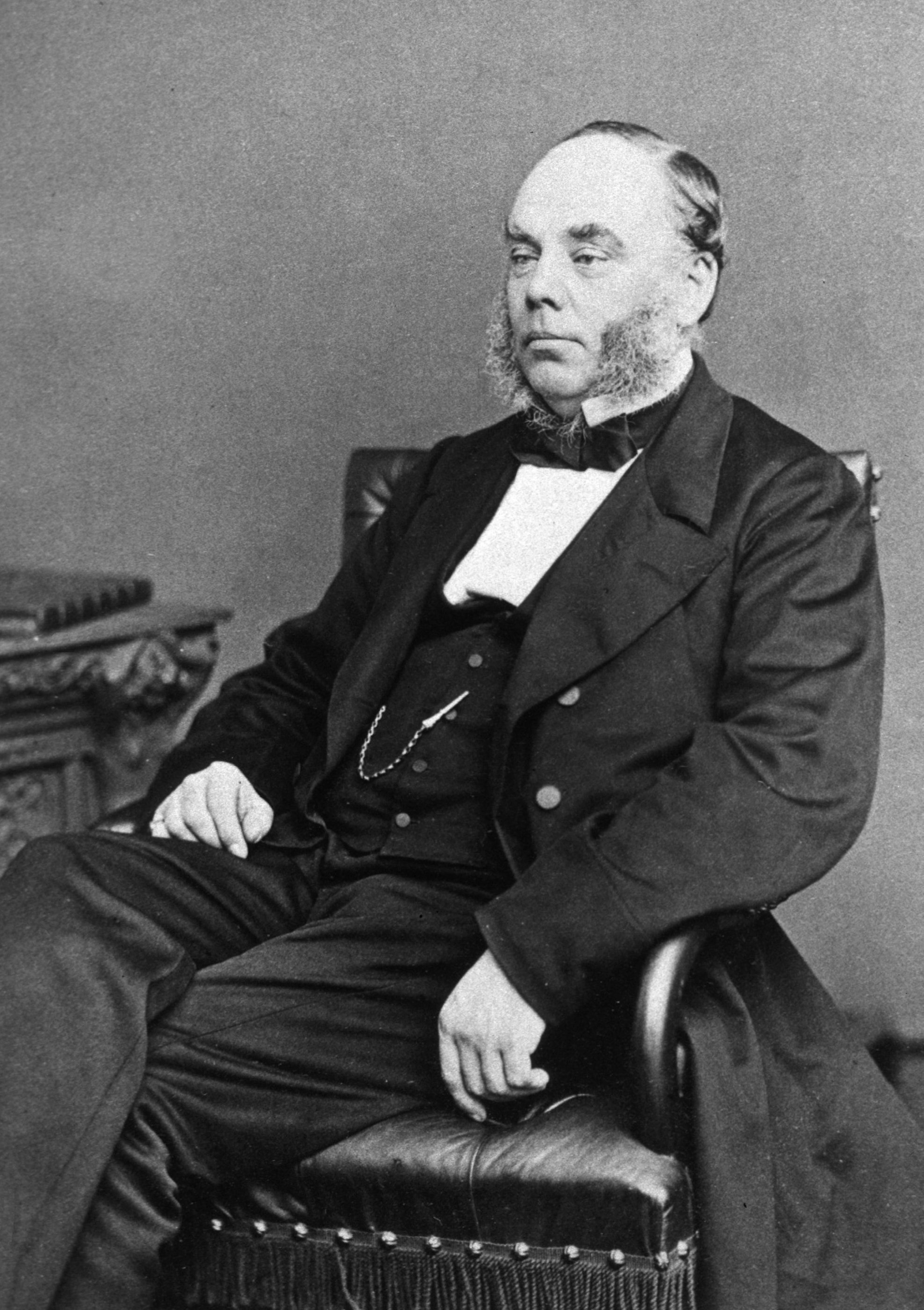
Robert Gardiner Hill

Robert Gardiner Hill MD (26 February 1811 – 30 May 1878) was a British surgeon specialising in the treatment of lunacy. He is normally credited with being the first superintendent of a small asylum (approximately 100 patients) to develop a mode of treatment in which reliance on mechanical medical restraint and coercion could be dropped altogether. In practice he reached this situation in 1838.

The debate concerning the merits of his methods continued for many years. Hill was marginalised by medical colleagues, in particular for his insistence that standard medical procedures had nothing to offer in the treatment of mental illness.

== Early career ==
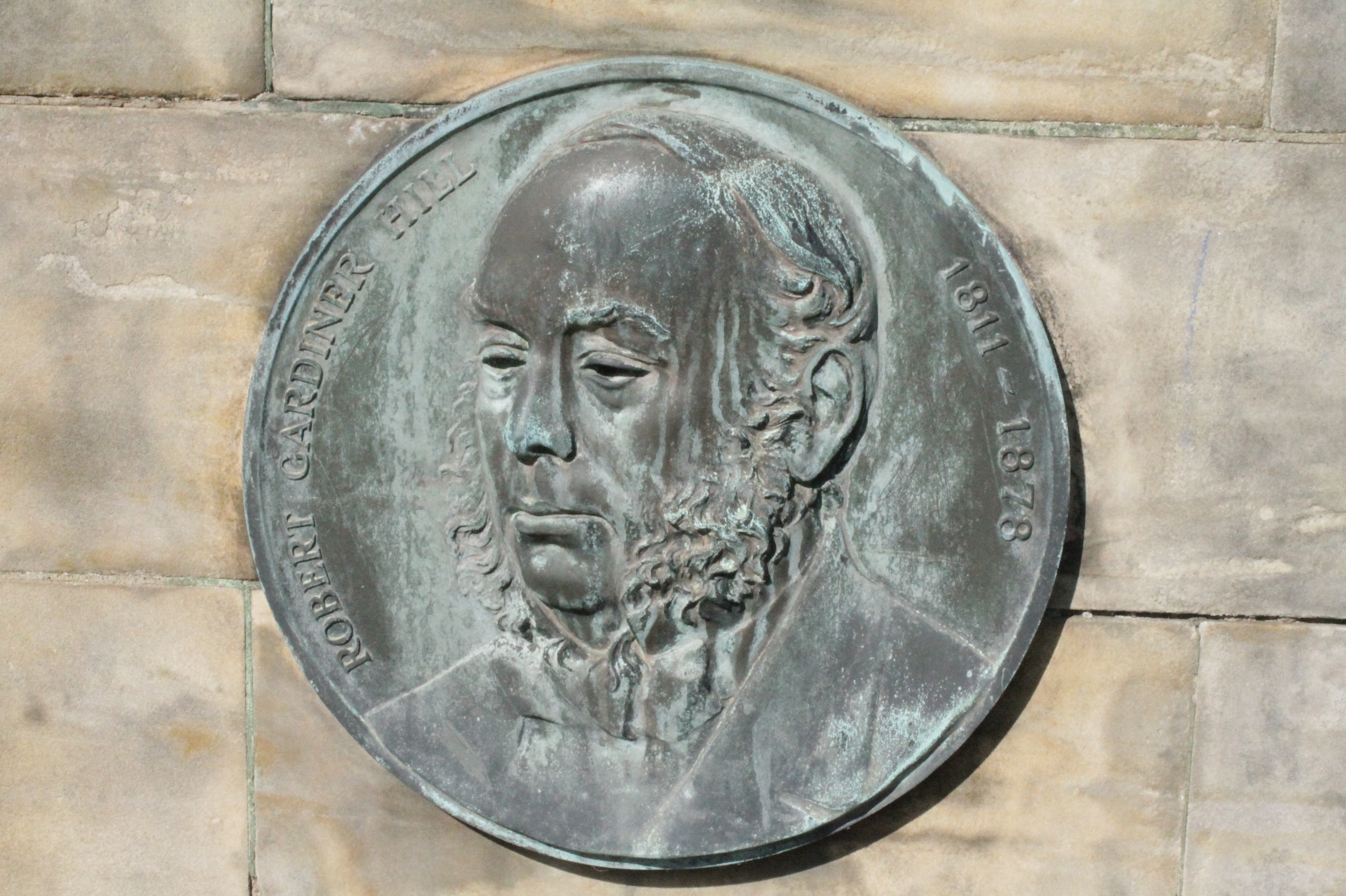
Memorial to Robert Gardiner Hill, Royal Edinburgh Hospital

The son of Robert Hill of Louth, Deene and lately of Leamington, he was born at Louth, Lincolnshire, on 26 February 1811; John Harwood Hill was an elder brother.

At the age of 14 he was apprenticed to a surgeon in Louth. He then studied at Edward Grainger's anatomy school, Guy's Hospital, and St. Thomas's Hospital, becoming a member of the Royal College of Surgeons of England in 1834.

On passing as a surgeon Hill went into practice at Lincoln, and in the same year obtained the appointment of house-surgeon to the General Dispensary there. At the Dispensary Hill worked with Dr. Edward Parker Charlesworth, who befriended him.

== "Non-restraint" ==
Hill, with Charlesworth's assistance, was elected house surgeon to the Lincoln Lunatic Asylum. There he introduced the system of moral management in use at the York Retreat. Charlesworth had already experimented with reducing the dependence at the asylum on mechanical restraint. Hill, soon after his appointment, looked into the registers of the asylum, and began to think that he might dispense with coercion altogether.

It appears from a comparison of the table of restraints for 1830, with the table for 1835, given in the appendix to Hill's book, that whereas, with a number of patients in the house, during the first of these years, amounting only to 92 (male and females included), the total number of instances of restraint had been 2364; in the latter of these years, with a number of patients greater, namely, 108, the total number of instances of restraint had only been 313; being a diminution of five-sixths of the number in the former year.

One of the improvements introduced by Hill in pursuance of his system was the dormitories, almost entirely established for the prevention of suicides. He attributed most bad cases to alcohol abuse, with religious factors as the next most important.

Hill had trouble maintaining a non-restraint system, without a better staff. The governors, however, would not offer higher pay without clear and convincing results. The system in fact required Hill to supervise the staff closely; it caused serious tensions in the asylum. By about 1839 the situation in the institution had become untenable. In 1840 Hill resigned from his post.

=== Legacy ===
Despite the problems Hill experienced, his system won admirers. One of them was Sergeant John Adams, who was an assistant judge. He took an interest in the asylum when circuit duties took him up to Lincoln. In his other capacity as chairman of the Middlesex magistrates and member of the Visiting Justices to Hanwell Asylum, he encouraged the newly appointed superintendent Dr. John Conolly to visit Lincoln Asylum and witness Hill's methods. This Conolly did in the month before taking up his appointment at Hanwell, where it is recorded in the visitors' book that he admired Hill's system.

== Career after Lincoln Asylum ==
Hill remained in the mental health field, working in a number of asylums. He entered into partnership with Richard Sutton Harvey in 1840, and became proprietor of Eastgate House private asylum, Lincoln. On 29 October 1851 he was given a public dinner in Lincoln and presented with a testimonial as the "author and originator of the non-restraint system in lunacy"; the claim was disputed, In November 1852 he was chosen mayor of Lincoln, and he was elected a Fellow of the Society of Antiquaries of London on 17 February 1853. In the later 1850s he was at Wyke House Asylum, in partnership with Edmund Sparshall Willett; the partnership was dissolved in 1860, with Willett remaining as proprietor. Hill became a licentiate of the College of Physicians, Edinburgh in 1859.

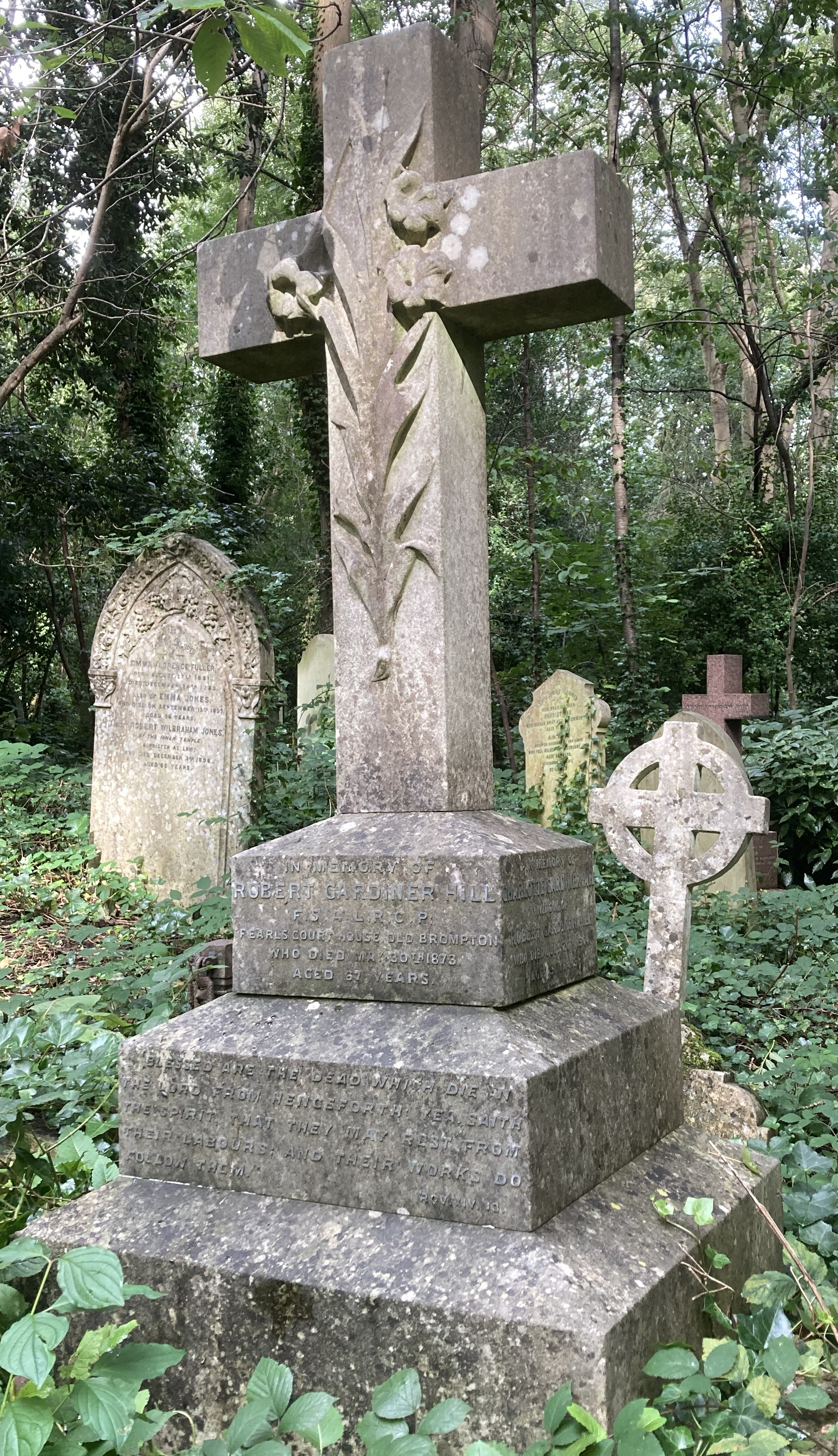
Family grave of Robert Gardiner Hill in Highgate Cemetery

In October 1863 Hill moved to London and became resident medical proprietor of Earl's Court House, Old Brompton, a private asylum for women, a residence formerly inhabited by John Hunter. He died of apoplexy at Earl's Court House, London, on 30 May 1878, and was buried on the western side of Highgate cemetery (plot no.22660). The grave is on the right-hand side of the main path almost opposite the tall Gothic Mears family monument.

Two of his sons James Robert Hill and Hugh Gardiner Hill also became doctors in asylums. His wife and at least three daughters were also closely involved in the care of the insane both before and after his death. They managed Peterborough House in Fulham and then Fenstanton House, Tulse Hill.

== Publications and controversy ==
Hill published:

- Total Abolition of Personal Restraint in the Treatment of the Insane. A Lecture, with Statistical Tables (1839).
- A Concise History of the entire Abolition of Medical Restraint in the Treatment of the Insane and of the success of the Non-Restraint System (1857).
- Lunacy, its Past and its Present (1870).

He also wrote articles "On Total Abolition of Personal Restraint in Treatment of the Insane" in The Lancet, 11 April 1840, p. 93, and 22 February 1851, pp. 226–7; and Psychological Studies, six articles in the Medical Circular, 6 January 1858, p. 1 et seq.

Hill's priority claim on non-restraint was put forward in The Lancet in 1850, in response to Charlesworth and Conolly. He did so again in the Concise History, in a response to Conolly. Sir James Clark, 1st Baronet wrote a Memoir of John Conolly that appeared in 1869, and Hill contributed further to the debate in 1870, in Lunacy.

== Lectures ==
- Hill Robert Gardiner (1839) A lecture on the Management of Lunatic Asylums and the Treatment of the Insane.

== See also ==
- Moral treatment
- Haw Camilla, Yorston Graeme (2004) Thomas Prichard and the non-restraint movement at the Northampton Asylum. Psychiatric Bulletin (2004) 28: 140–142
