= Sunday Driver (band) =

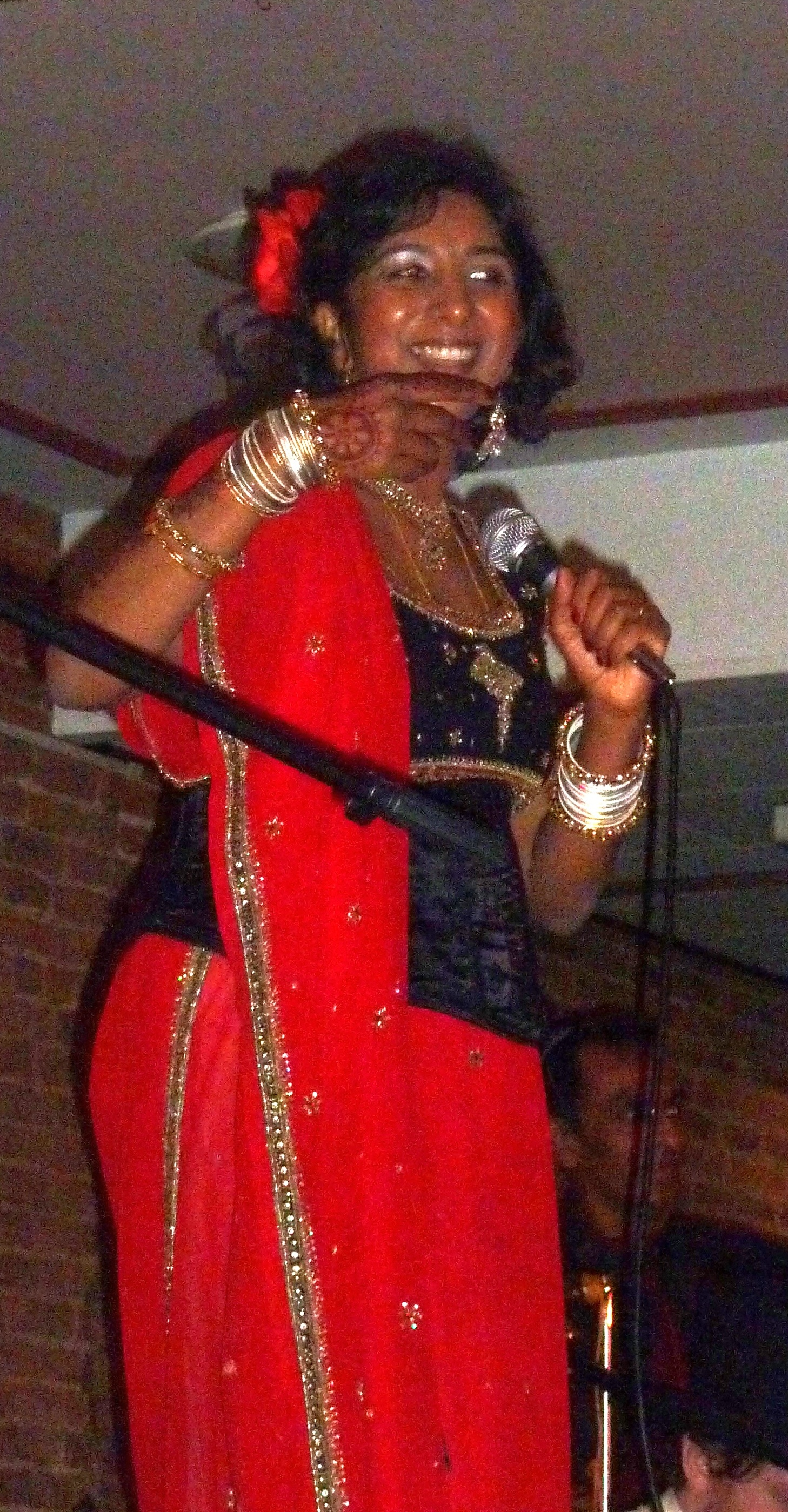
- Chandy Nath on stage in Lincoln, 2011

Background information
- Origin: London, UK
- Genres: Folk; Carnatic
- Years active: 2000–present
- Members: Chandrika Nath; James Clayton; Kat Arney; Amit Jogia; Richard Bullen; Simon Richardson; Scot Jowett; Joe Nicholson (sound technician); Charlie Suarez (backup dancer/cleaning crew)
- Website: www.sundaydriver.co.uk

Sunday Driver are a Cambridge and London based band that fuses English folk and classical Indian influences. In 2009 they became popular within the UK steampunk scene.

== History ==
"Sunday Driver" are named after a gene (SYD) originally found in fruit flies.

Sunday Driver were formed in the summer of 2000, though lead singer Chandrika "Chandy" Nath had earlier composed some of the songs whilst monitoring ice floes near the South Pole, during a field trip in Antarctica, collecting data for the British Antarctic Survey.

An Arts Council grant back in 2004 paid for training workshops with renowned sitarist Baluji Shrivastav.

In 2009, Sunday Driver were the opening band at the first Asylum Steampunk Festival, held at The Lawn Asylum, Lincoln, the same year they opened the Cambridge Folk Festival. They also played the steampunk festival in 2010 and headlined the main Ball there in 2011.

== Discography ==
=== Albums ===
- Sacred Cow / The Man from Bombay (2001) (Demo Compilation)
- More than Flies (2002) (EP)
- Underground (2003) (EP)
- In the City of Dreadful Night (2008) (Debut Full Length Album)
- The Mutiny (2012)
- Flo (2014) (EP)
- Sun God (2022)
- Devils (2024) (Single)
- Silk and Filth (2025)

== See also ==
- List of steampunk works: Steampunk musicians
