= Richard Ingleman =

English architect and surveyor

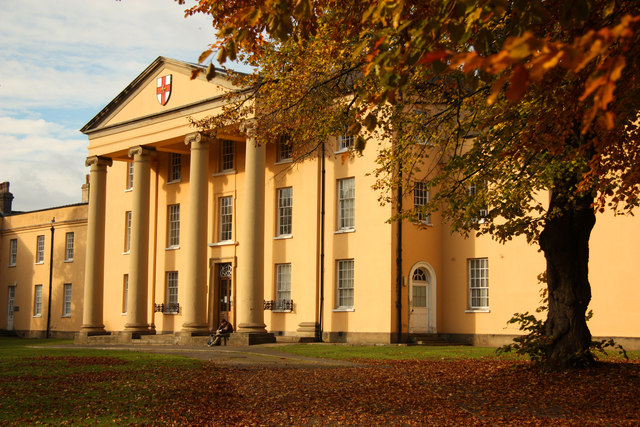
- The Lawn, Lincoln
- Born: 1777; Southwell
- Died: 11 January 1838 (aged 60–61); Southwell
- Occupation: Architect
- Buildings: Southwell House of Correction; The Lawn, Lincoln; Warneford Hospital, Oxford

Richard Ingleman (1777–1838) was a surveyor and architect of Southwell in Nottinghamshire, England. Initially his architectural practice was based on the Southwell area, but he won widespread respect for his designs for the Southwell House of Correction (1807–8). This led to his gaining major commissions for prisons and mental hospitals, particularly in Wiltshire and at Oxford.

== Life and career ==
Richard Ingleman was the son of Francis Ingleman, a surveyor and builder of Southwell, and the grandson of Richard Ingleman, a mason who repaired Southwell Minster after a lightning strike in 1711.

Richard Ingleman is first noted as a Surveyor to the fabric of Southwell Minster, a position he held from 1801 to 1808. In 1807 he designed the Southwell House of Correction, a prison which was seen as a model for other prisons. This operated the silent system which required the prisoners to work in groups and to remain silent at all times. This was to give him an interest in prison and institutional design. He entered unsuccessfully the competition in 1812 for the design of the Milbank Penitentiary which was to be built on the present site of the Tate Gallery. He was successful in two other large prison projects: the rebuilding of Devizes New Bridewell and the Fisherton Anger House of Correction in Salisbury.

The Devizes New Bridewell was started in 1810, and at the same time Ingleman started supervising the building of the Nottingham Lunatic Asylum. It was not until 1817 that he started on the Fisherton Anger House of Correction, but by this time he had been approached to design the Warneford Mental Hospital at Oxford, which was built between 1821 and 1826.

In 1826, Ingleman wrote to the Trustees of the Warneford Hospital saying that he was now incapacitated by illness and asked for the final payment of £50 for the completion of the hospital. He does not appear to have undertaken any further architectural work after this date and he died at Southwell in 1838, at the age of 51.

Howard Colvin notes that Ingleman's asylums were classical buildings of no special distinction, but the unexecuted plans he submitted for the re-building of Shelton Church, Nottinghamshire, were an essay in Early English style which were quite creditable for the time. He undertook some country house building and favoured the use of Ionic columns for porches and porticos, as seen at Conock House near Devizes (1817) and at Ordsall Rectory (now Ordsall Hall) in Nottinghamshire. He also used massive Ionic columns for the portico to the Lawn Asylum in Lincoln.

== Architectural work ==
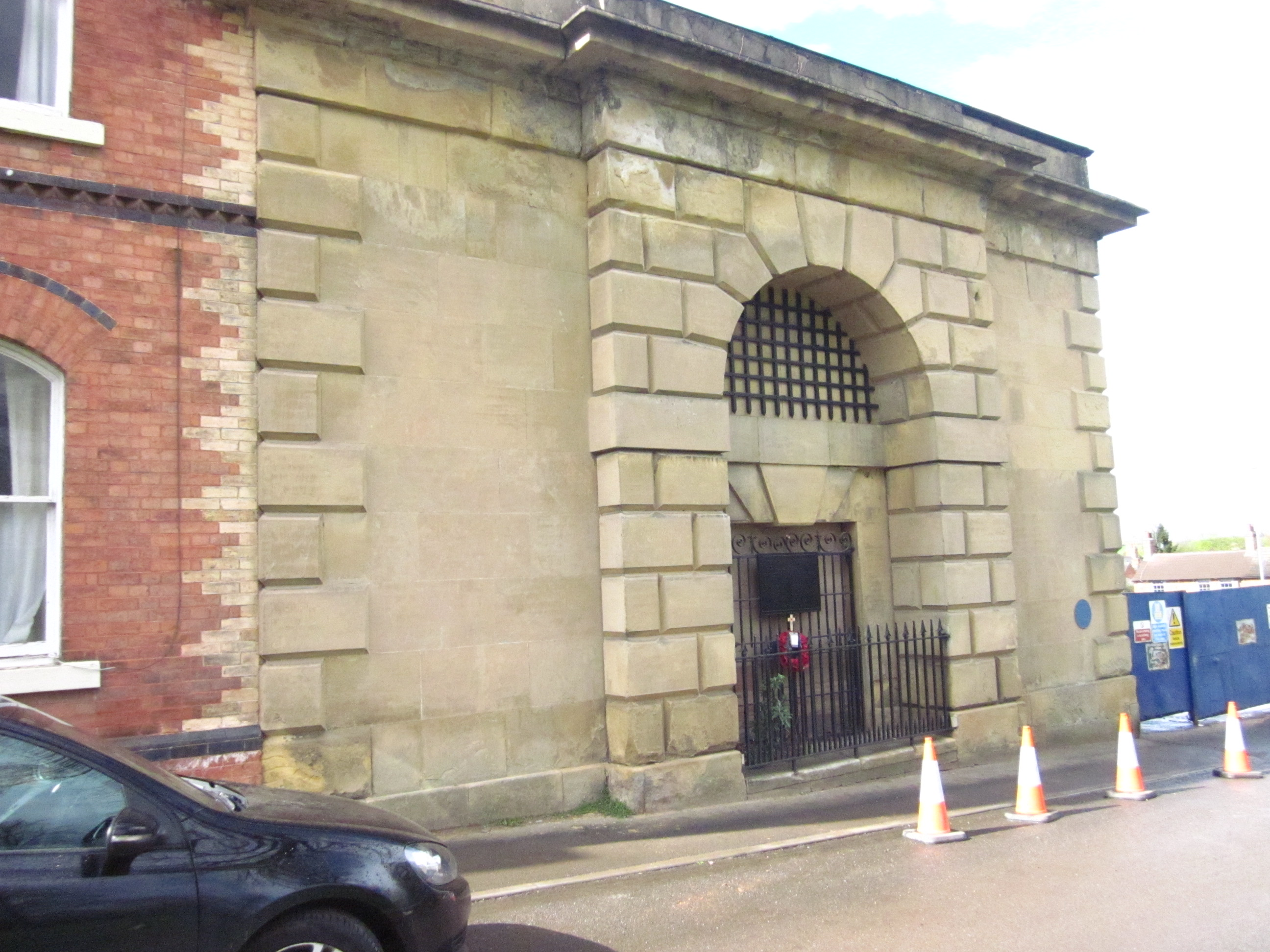
Gateway to the Southwell House of Correction

- Southwell Minster, Nottinghamshire. Repairs to the fabric, 1801–5, including the removal of the two pyramid-shaped spires from the two western towers.
- The Assembly Rooms, Southwell, Nottinghamshire. These adjoin the Saracen’s Head.
- The Residence House, Southwell, alterations and improvements, 1806–9.
- The House of Correction, Southwell, Nottinghamshire, 1807. Extended in 1817.

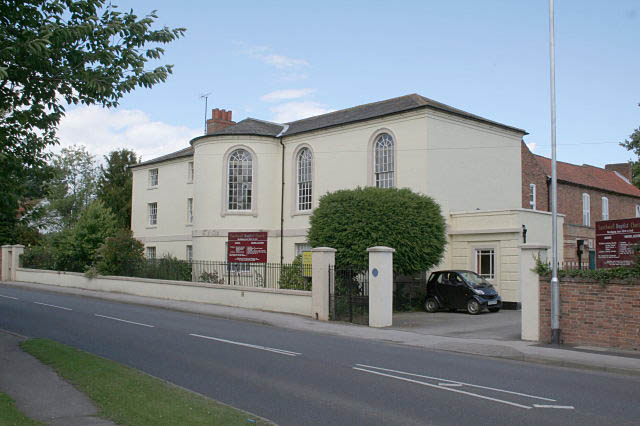
Former Southwell workhouse, now Baptist Chapel

- Southwell Parish Workhouse, 1808. A parish workhouse for 84 inmates in Moor Lane, Southwell. It was designed by the Revd John T Becher in association with a local architect, believed to be Ingleman. Becher published the plan of the workhouse in 1828 in his book The Anti-pauper System. When the Thurgaton Wapentake or Union workhouse was built in 1824 the building was no longer needed and was converted into a Baptist chapel.
- Devizes House of Correction, Wiltshire, 1810–17. The prison was a polygon of brick and stone with the governor's building in the middle. There were 210 cells, 16 yards, 2 infirmaries and a chapel.
- Nottingham, The Lunatic Asylum, 1810–12.
- Conock House, nr. Devizes, Wiltshire. Added Ionic porch and wings for E. Warriner in 1817.
- Ordsall Rectory (now Ordsall Hall), Nottinghamshire 1819. According to Pevsner: "A two storey stucco house of excellent proportions".
- Fisherton Anger Prison, Salisbury, 1817. This was the Wiltshire County Prison and plans survive in the Wiltshire and Swindon History Centre. Only the central block survives today, as New Radnor House.
- The Woodborough Prebend, Southwell, c. 1818. New frontage added to an earlier house.

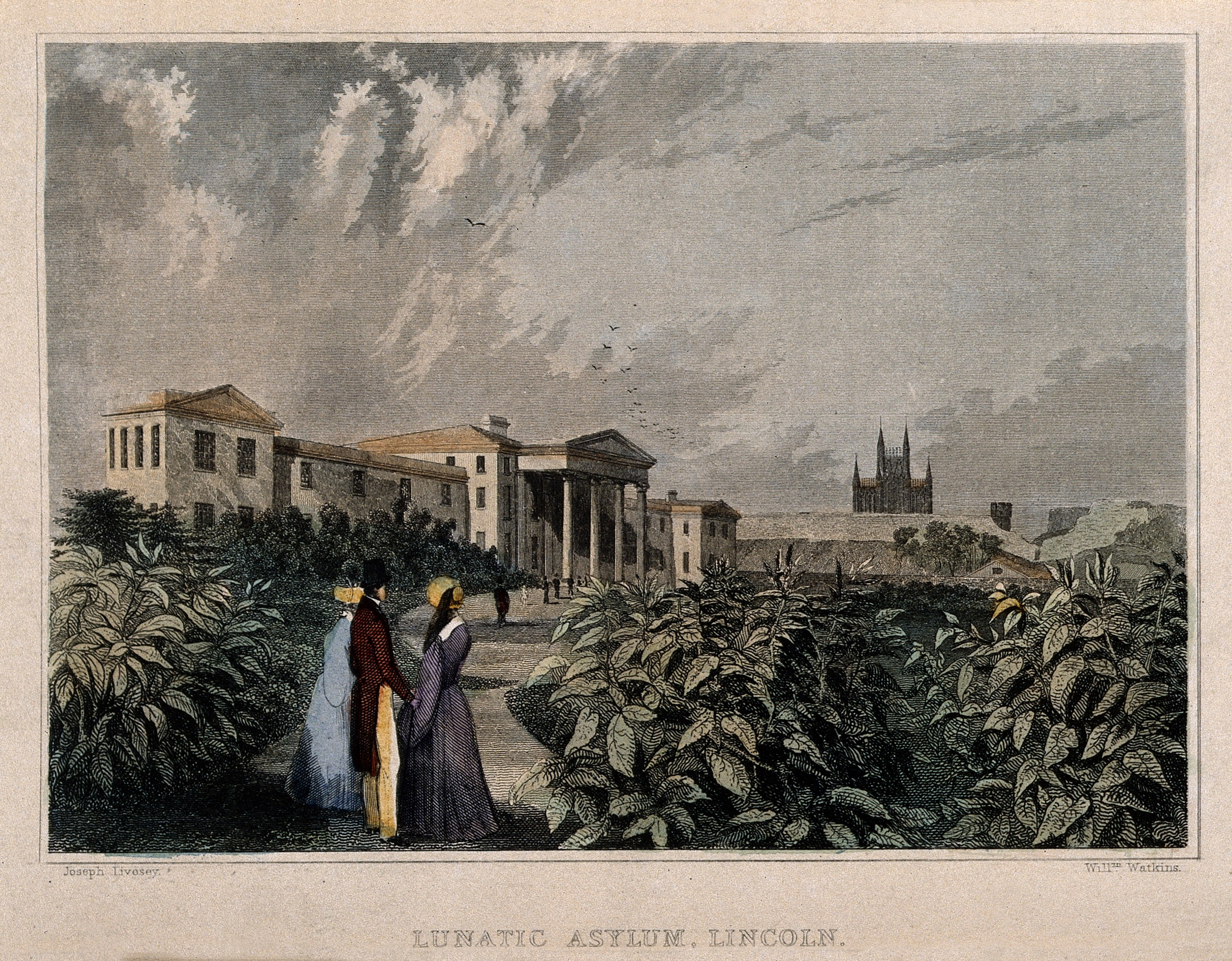
The Lawn Asylum, Lincoln. Coloured line engraving by W. Watkin, 1835

- The Lawn, Mental Hospital, Lincoln, 1819–20.
- The Grammar School, Southwell, 1820. Erected on the site of the Chantry Priests' house; remained in use until 1964.
- Rydd Court, Worcestershire.
- The Warneford Mental Hospital, Oxford, 1821–6. Originally known as the Oxford Lunatic Asylum, it later became known as The Radcliffe Asylum, and after 1843, as the Warneford Lunatic Asylum. It was intended for three classes of non-pauper patients who would pay for their care according to their financial circumstances.

== Gallery of work by Richard Ingleman ==
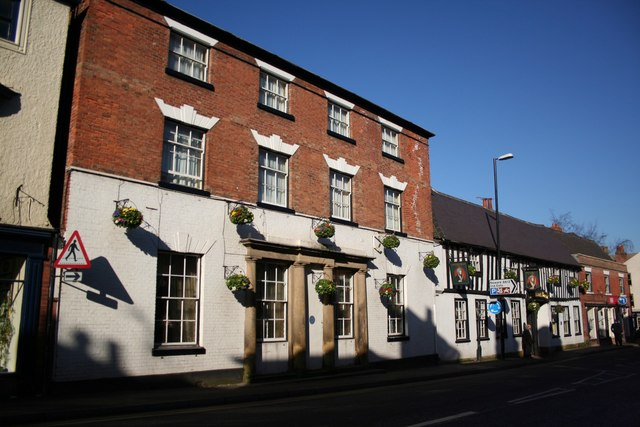
Assembly Rooms, Southwell

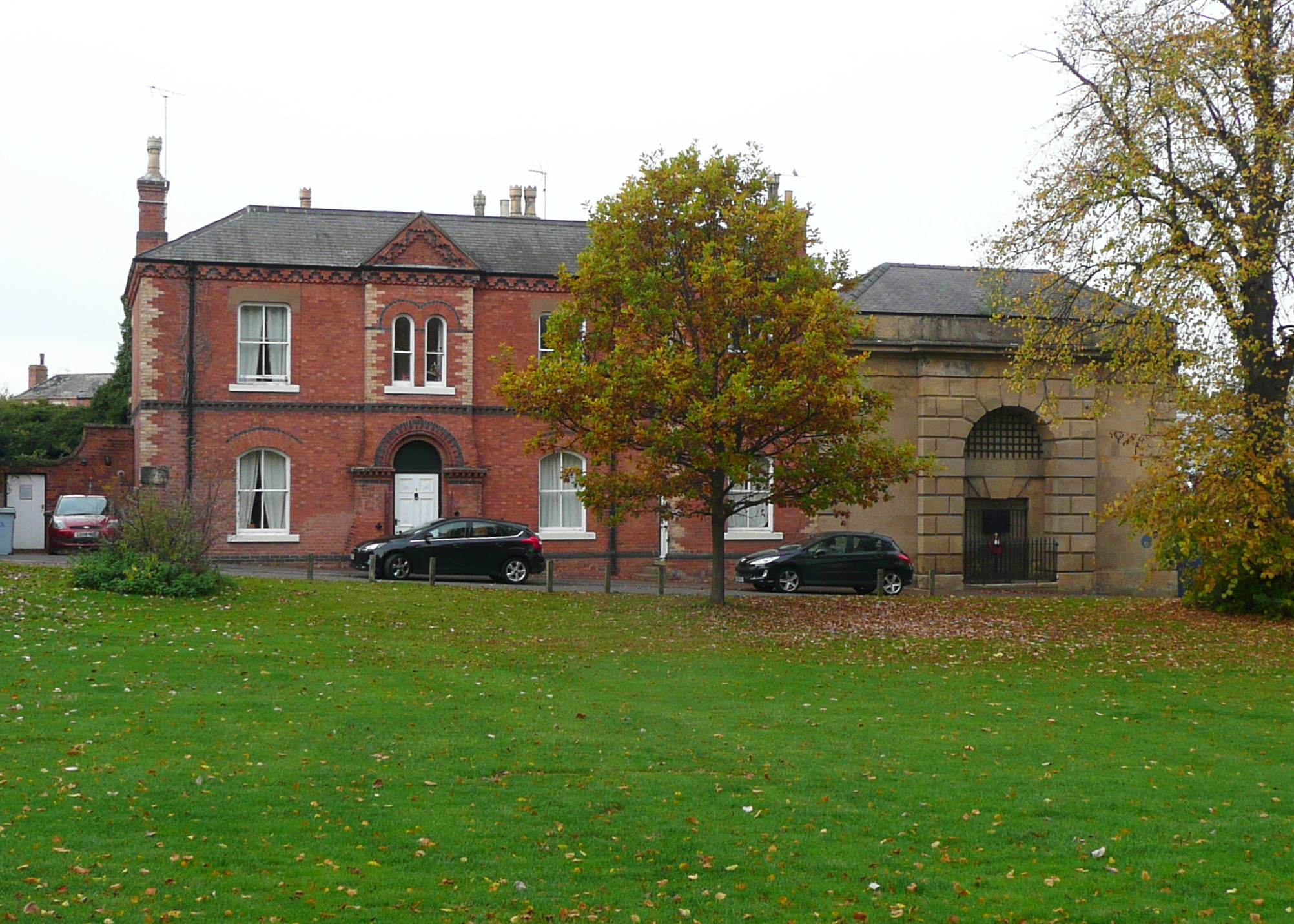
The Governor's House and the Prison Gate, Southwell

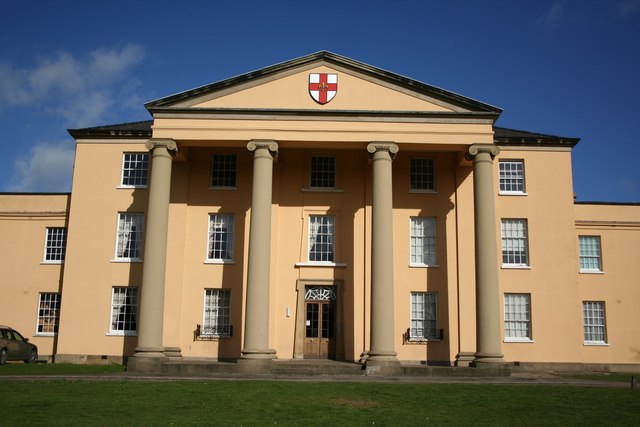
The Lawn portico

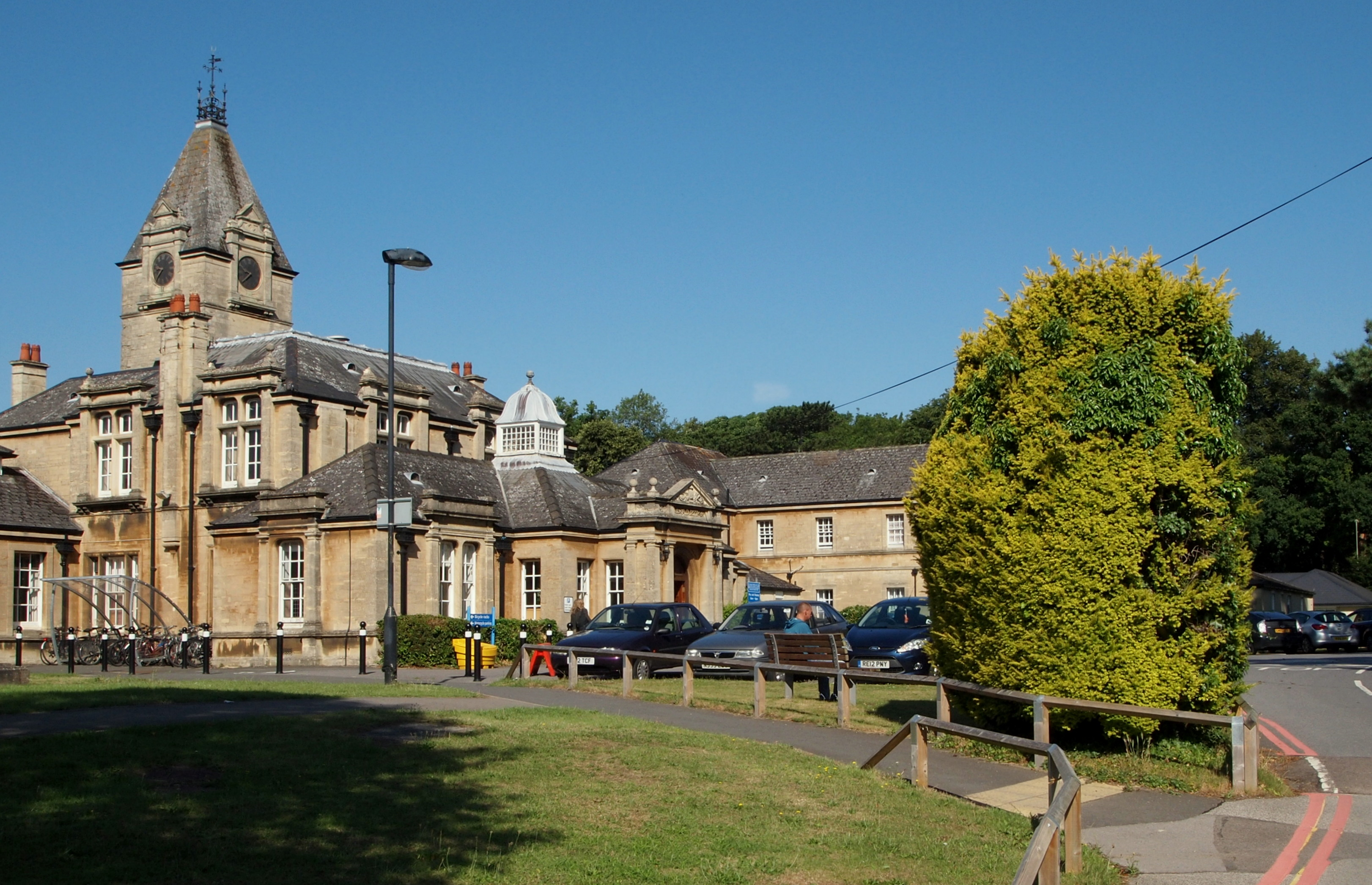
Warneford Hospital, Headington Hill, Oxford

== Literature ==
- Nikolaus Pevsner; John Harris; Nicholas Antram (revised) (1989). The Buildings of England: Lincolnshire. Yale University Press. ISBN 978-0-300-09620-0.
- Howard Colvin (1995). A Biographical Dictionary of British Architects, 1600-1840. Yale University Press. pp. 525–6. ISBN 978-0-300-12508-5.
- Morrison K. (1999), The Workhouse: A Study of Poor -Law Buildings in England, English Heritage/RCHME, ISBN 9781873592366
- Parry-Jones B. (1976), The Warneford Hospital, Oxford.
- Nikolaus Pevsner; Elizabeth Williamson (1979). The Buildings of England: Nottinghamshire. Yale University Press. ISBN 978-0-300-09636-1.
- Smith R. (2015) Nottinghamshire House of Correction, Southwell (1611-1880): A Model Institution: Essential History and Architectural Notes, Southwell and District Local History Society. ISBN 978-0-9932442-2-3
- Summers N., A Prospect of Southwell.
