= Radcliffe College, Oxford =

Proposed college of the University of Oxford

Radcliffe College
- University of Oxford
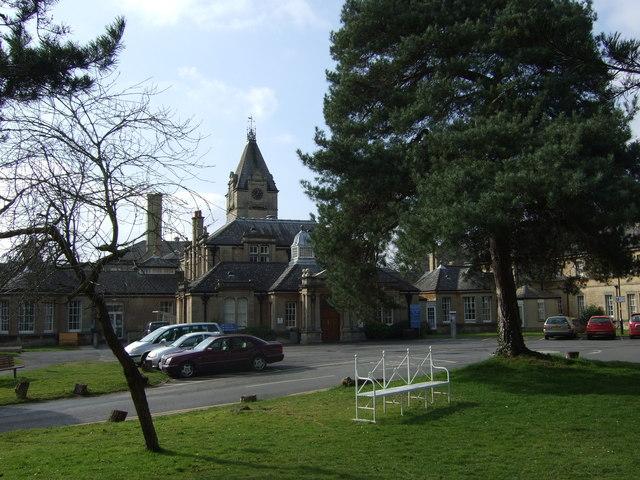
- The Warneford Hospital site at present, before redevelopment
- Coordinates: 51.751°N 1.221°W
- Latin name: Collegium de Radcliffe
- Named for: John Radcliffe

Map
- Location within Oxfordshire

Radcliffe College is a proposed constituent college of the University of Oxford in England and the first to be located in Headington.

== College ==
The central university plans to found Radcliffe College alongside its broader redevelopment of the Grade II listed Warneford Hospital, a mental health institution, and creation of a new 'Warneford Park' complex. In close proximity to the John Radcliffe Hospital, the new college is to have a focus on medicine and provide teaching for postgraduate medical students, 250 of whom will live on site.

The college will be named after John Radcliffe (1650–1714), the Yorkshire-born physician and politician.
