= Sir Joseph Banks Conservatory =

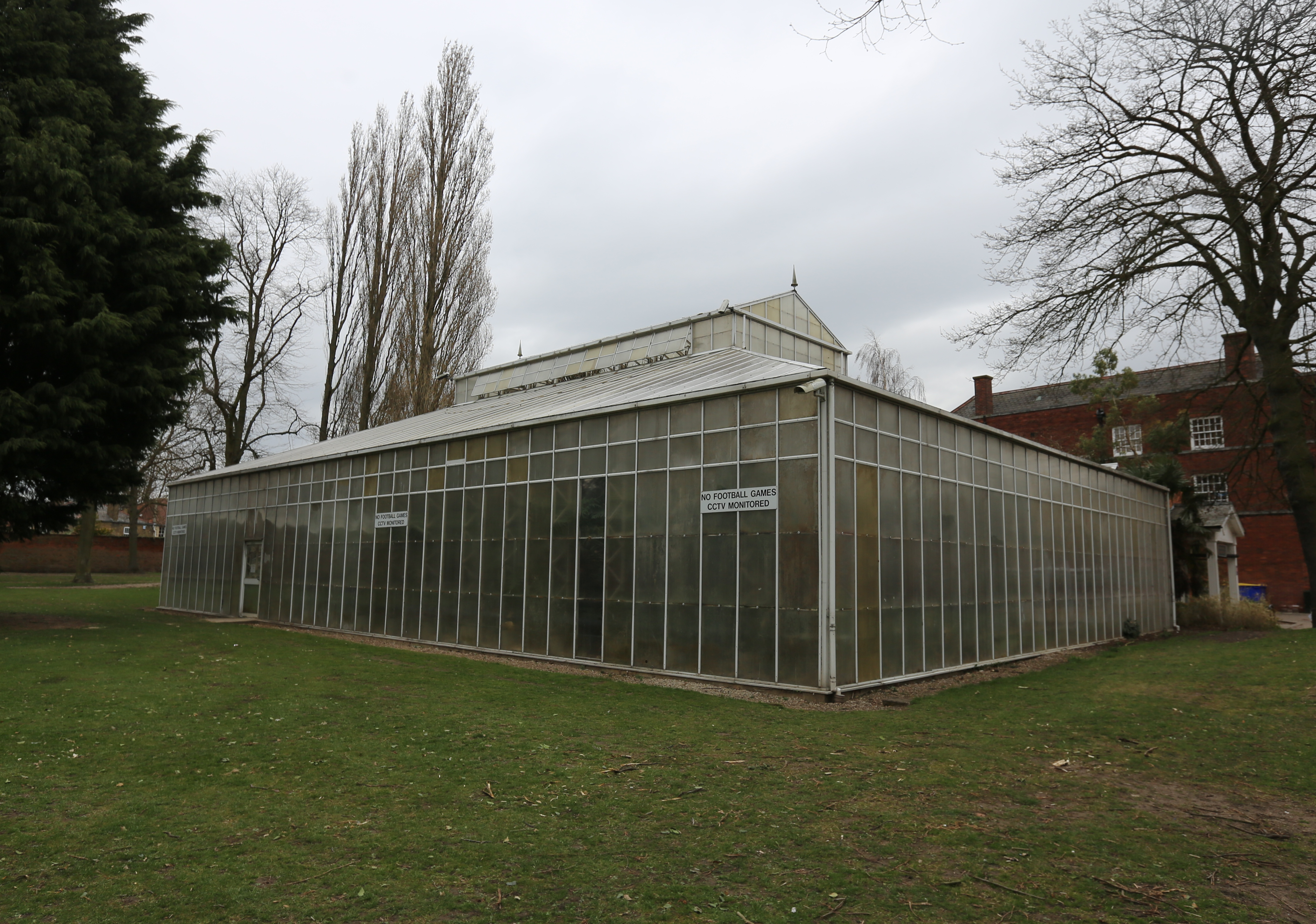
Exterior of the Sir Joseph Banks Conservatory

The Sir Joseph Banks Conservatory is a tropical house at Woodside Wildlife Park in Lincolnshire, England.

== History ==
The Sir Joseph Banks Conservatory is a 5,000-square-foot (460 m^{2}) tropical house, originally constructed in 1989 within The Lawn complex in Lincoln. It was themed with plants and reminiscent of the voyages of its namesake, Sir Joseph Banks, the British naturalist and botanist from London who, as long-time president of the Royal Society, became known for his promotion of science.

=== Sale ===
In 2016, the site of the conservatory was sold by the City of Lincoln council to the Stokes coffee company. The conservatory building was moved to the Woodside Wildlife Park, near Langworth, which planned to use it for educational and conservation purposes, including housing crocodiles and red pandas, to show how earth has changed since Banks' voyages. The conservatory has been named 'Endeavour' by Woodside Wildlife Park, after the ship Banks sailed with to South America and Australia from 1768 to 1771. A car park was built at The Lawn on the former location of the conservatory.
