= Weekend at the Asylum =

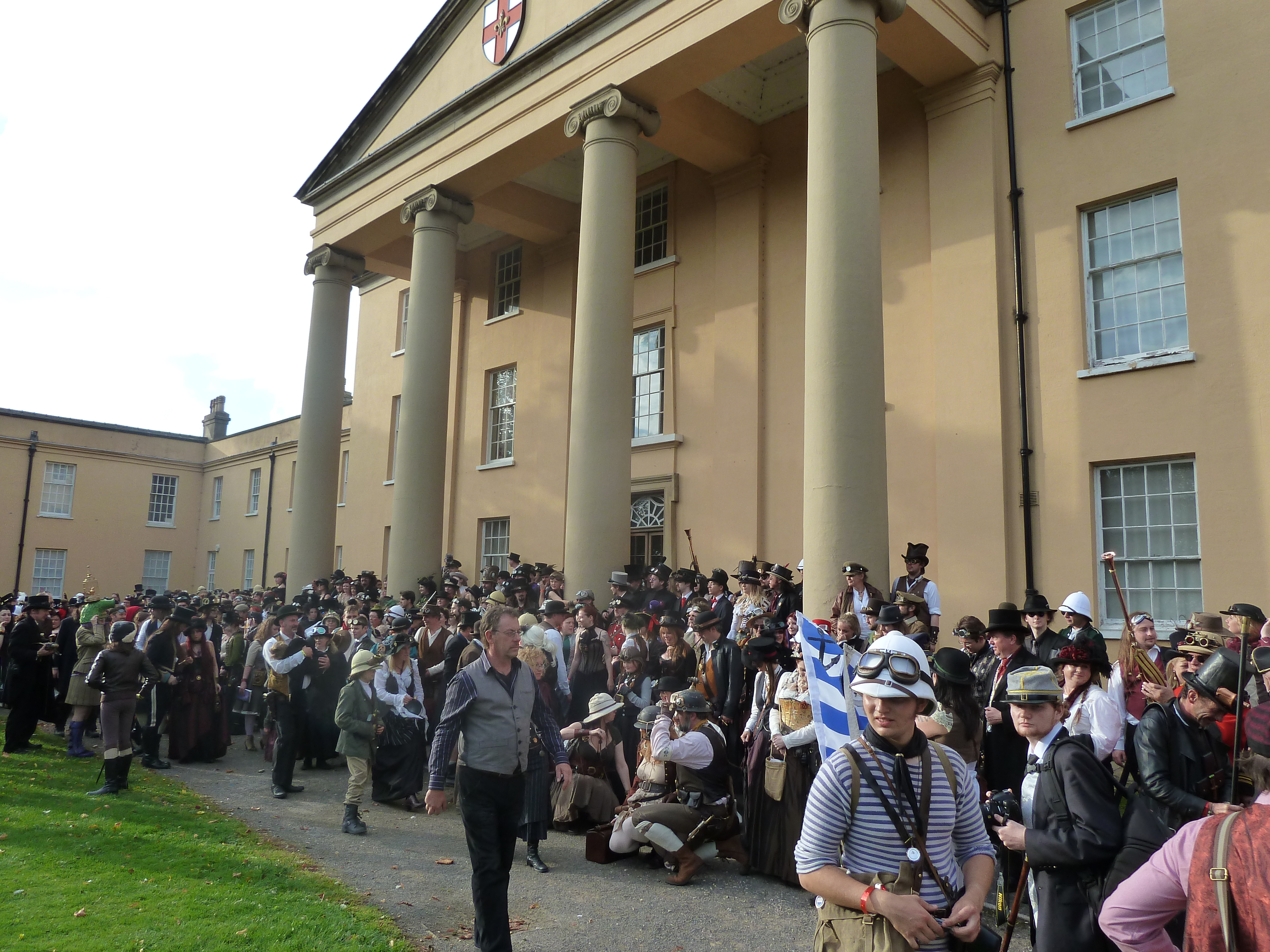
2011 world record attempt for most steampunks in one place at Lincoln's Weekend at the Asylum

Weekend at the Asylum (commonly shortened to just The Asylum) is likely the largest and second longest running steampunk festival in the world. Since 2009 - 2020, starting up again in 2022 the festival (or convivial in steampunk parlance) has been held annually in Lincoln and currently stretches over multiple venues in the historic cathedral quarter of Lincoln town, Lincoln Castle and Bishop Grosseteste University. It is run as a not-for-profit event organised by the now Ministry of Steampunk, previously the Victorian Steampunk Society.

It combines four full days of features, classes, craft workshops and entertainment, such as the Grand Ball, Majors Review (The Major's Soiree) and the Asylum Tea Duelling Championship, along with live music, comedy acts and the largest steampunk market in the world referred to as the Bazaar Eclectica.

== 2009 festival ==
The 2009 festival was held between Friday 11 and Sunday 13 September at The Lawn (the former Lincoln Lunatic Asylum) and was attended by 432 steampunks.

== 2010 festival ==
The 2010 festival was held between Friday 10 and Sunday 12 September in The Lawn and Bailgate area. It included concerts, book signings and a market and was attended by almost a thousand steampunks.

== 2011 festival ==
The 2011 festival was held between Friday 9 and Sunday 11 September and attracted more than a thousand steampunks from across the World. Still based mainly in the Lawn and Bailgate area this year also included various events in Lincoln Castle including the Bazaar Eclectica being run from the old Victorian prison and an attempt to unofficially break the record for the most steampunks gathered in one place. The success of this year resulted in the convention being called the Best International Convention in the Steampunk Chronicle Readers Awards in April 2012.

== 2012 festival ==
The 2012 festival was held between Friday 14 and Sunday 16 September and was the first to no longer include The Lawn as a venue due to its being sold by the City of Lincoln Council earlier in the year.

== 2013 festival ==
The 2013 festival was held between Friday 13 and Sunday 15 September, it was attended by close to 2000 steampunks.

== 2014 festival ==
The 2014 festival was held between Friday 12 and Sunday 14 September and was attended by over 2000 steampunks.

== 2015 festival ==
The 2015 festival was the first to stretch over 4 days and was held Friday-Monday 28-31 August, it was attended by thousands of steampunks and stretched across the cathedral quarter, castle and Bailgate area.

== 2016 festival ==
The 2016 festival was held between Thursday 25th and Monday 29 August and included venues across the cathedral quarter, castle, Bailgate area, Bishop Grosseteste University and the University of Lincoln. This festival featured the UK debut of steampunk themed folk rock band Steam Powered Giraffe at Time Travelers.

=== Notable guests ===
==== Musicians and bands ====
- Alice's Night Circus (Alice Strange)
- Before Victoria
- B.J.Skinner
- Brass Zeppelin
- Captain of the Lost Waves
- Experiment No.Q
- Frenchy and the Punk
- Victor Sierra
- Lady Violet Hugh
- Lincoln Ukulele Club
- Lonely Mister Punch
- Mr. B The Gentleman Rhymer
- Professor Elemental
- Steam Powered Giraffe
- The Cogkneys
- The Filthy Spectacula
- The Iron Boot Scrapers
- The Men That Will Not Be Blamed For Nothing

==== Magicians ====
- Dr Todd Landman
- Doctor Corvus Marconi
- Sylvia Sceptre

==== Dancers and dancing groups ====
- Scarlet Butterfly
- Poacher Morris
- Raven's Morris
- Belly Fusion Dance Collective

==== Authors and artists ====
- Rob Harkess
- Sam Stone
- Raven Dane
- David J. Howe
- Steve Turnbull
- Gary Nicholls
- Charli Anderson

==== Comedians ====
- Andrew O'Neill

== 2017 festival ==
The 2017 festival was held between the evening of Thursday 24th and Monday 28 August. Organisers claim it was attended by between 35,000 and 40,000 people a day.

=== Notable guests ===
==== Musicians and bands ====
- Steam Powered Giraffe
- Mr. B The Gentleman Rhymer
- Before Victoria
- Captain of the Lost Waves
- The Filthy Spectacula
- Gatsby’s Jukebox
- Sunday Driver
- The Lonely Mister Punch
- Victor Sierra
- Alice's Night Circus (Alice Strange)
- Kuppa T and the Zeppelin Crew
- Lady Violet Hugh
- Charlie Draper and his Theremin
- Justin and the Argonauts
- Victor and the Bully
- Feline and Strange
- Lincoln Ukulele Club
- Lincolnshire Fire and Rescue Concert Band
- SCONE: Steampunk Choir of Notorious Excellence
- The Rambling Yellowbellies

==== Magicians ====
- Doctor Corvus Marconi
- Dr Nicolas Grimoire

==== Dancers and dancing groups ====
- Scarlet Butterfly
- Talulah Blue
- Poacher Morris
- Belly Fusion Dance Collective

==== Authors and artists ====
- Kevan Manwaring
- Jade Sarson
- Steve Tanner
- Andy Wright
- Nick Simpson
- Jenny Gyllblad
- Collin Mathieson
- Dave West
- Arthur Morgan
- Craig Hallam
- Stuart Geo Muir
- Charli Anderson-Farrar
- Tom and Nimue Brown
- S. A. Sanderson
- Nick Rossert
- Katherine Ellis
- Gary Nicholls

==== Comedians ====
- Marc Burrows
- Dr Cornelius Porridge

== 2018 festival ==
The 2018 festival was held between Friday 24th and Monday 27 August.

== 2019 festival ==
The 2019 festival was held between Friday 23rd and Monday 26 August.

== 2022 festival ==
The 2022 festival was held between the evening of Thursday 25th and Monday 29 August.

== 2023 festival ==
The 2023 festival was held between the evening of Thursday 24th and the evening of Monday 28 August.

=== Selected artists and entertainment ===
- Friday evening, the Decodance featuring The Retrobates
- Saturday evening, the Grand Asylum Ball featuring Wight Hot Pipes
- Saturday evening, Asylum Introducing featuring The Hagley Woof Vampires, The Antipoet, Nonah, Ullalele, Missy K, Rock Paper Science
- Sunday evening, The Major's Soiree featuring Madam Misfit, and The Brass Brothers
- Sunday evening, Time Travellers featuring Thomas Benjamin Wild Esq., Frenchy & The Punk, Victor and the Bully
- Monday evening, The Dog Dead Party with Captain's Beard

== 2024 festival ==
The 2024 festival was held between Thursday 22 and Monday 26 August and included venues across the cathedral quarter, castle, Bailgate area, Bishop Grosseteste University and the University of Lincoln, with evening entertainment at venues such as The Engine Shed and Lincoln Drill Hall.

=== Notable guests ===
==== Musicians and bands ====
- Thomas Benjamin Wild Esq
- Alice Strange
- Mr B The Gentleman Rhymer
- Lady Violet Hugh
- The Retrobates
- The Captain's Beard
- Odelia Opium
- Madame Misfit
- Victor and the Bully
- Wight Hot Pipes
- Dead Dog Party

==== Magicians ====
- Dr Corvus Marconi
- The Magic Ball Man
- Kiki Lovechild

==== Dancers and dancing groups ====
- Belly Fusion Dance Collective
- Scarlett Butterfly

==== Authors, artists and others ====
- Lady Elsie & the Steamstress Squadron
- The Antipoet
- The Brass Brothers
- Bambi Bang Bang

==== Comedians ====
- Seedy Frills
- Miss Strawberry Moon

== 2025 Festival ==
The 2025 Festival was held between Friday the 22nd and Monday the 25th August

== 2026 Festival ==
The 2026 Festival was held between Friday 28th and Monday 31st of August.
