= Devizes County House of Corrections =

Defunct prison in England

HMP Devizes House of County Corrections
- Interactive map of HMP Devizes House of County Corrections
- Location: Devizes, Wiltshire; 51°21′08″N 2°00′37″W
- Population: 710
- Opened: 1810
- Closed: 1921
- Former name: HM Prison Devizes
- Managed by: HM Prison Services

The Devizes County House of Corrections or Devizes Prison was a correctional facility in Devizes, Wiltshire, England. It opened in 1817, replacing the Old Bridewell prison, and fell out of use after around a hundred years. For a time it was the only prison in Wiltshire.

== The Old Bridewell ==
Devizes Castle was used as a prison for petty criminals in the Wiltshire area until it was destroyed in the 15th century.

Wiltshire Justices decided to build a formal house of corrections, following the example of Bridewell Prison, London, which had opened in 1556. A timber-framed building was erected in what is now Bridewell Street (51°21′00″N 1°59′32″W). Completed in 1579, this remained the only bridewell in Wiltshire until c. 1631. It was damaged by fire in 1619 and again in 1630, then re-fronted in brick in 1771. Between 1770 and 1806 various improvements were made to the bridewell after an inmate Thomas Platt died of cold and hunger in custody. By 1806 the prison had 12 cells, 6 yards, an infirmary and a chapel.

In 1817 the New Bridewell was opened and the Old Bridewell was left almost defunct, occasionally being used to detain pre-trial suspects, until it was officially closed in 1836. The building was then used by Wiltshire Constabulary from 1839 as a police station until 1855 when they moved to the Town Hall. After then the building was used as residences for Superintendents and Constables, until 1871. At the 1881 census the building was in use as a Ladies' School.

By 1882 the building had been renamed The Grange, and was used as an infants' day nursery from 1895 till 1903, and later as a home for elderly women. In 2009 Devizes Town Council awarded the building a historic plaque. Today the building is a private residence.

== The New Bridewell ==
The Devizes County House of Corrections was opened in 1817 after taking seven years to build, and was the replacement for The Old Bridewell. It was located on the west side of Devizes, near what is still called Prison Bridge over the Kennet and Avon Canal.

The prison, designed by Richard Ingleman, was a polygon of brick and stone with the governor's building in the middle. There were 210 cells, 16 yards, two infirmaries and a chapel. After a report identifying the lesser treatment of women, new cells were built in 1841 for them, as well as a laundry room, day room and separate infirmary. From 1823 the prison also featured a treadmill that milled corn outside the prison walls. Cells measured 10 feet high, 7½ feet wide and 8½ feet long; women's cells were slightly smaller. Labor included treadmilling corn, whitewashing, baking, cooking and cleaning. Later additions to the facility include a schoolhouse in 1842, ten additional cells and an extension to the chapel in 1867.

Devizes Prison again became the only prison in Wiltshire after the closure in 1868 of Fisherton Anger jail, just outside Salisbury. The prison was handed to the state in 1877. Between 1912 and 1914 the prison was used only for prisoners on remand. It was a military detention barracks from 1914 until 1920, when it fell completely out of use. In 1921 Devizes Prison officially closed. The building was sold the next year and demolished in 1927.

The land where Devizes Prison was located is now covered by a housing estate. The only prison in Wiltshire is now HM Prison Erlestoke.

== See also ==
- Devizes
- Devizes Castle
- Wiltshire Constabulary
