= Edward Parker Charlesworth =

English physician

Edward Parker Charlesworth (1783–1853) was an English medical doctor, known as an innovator in psychiatric treatment.

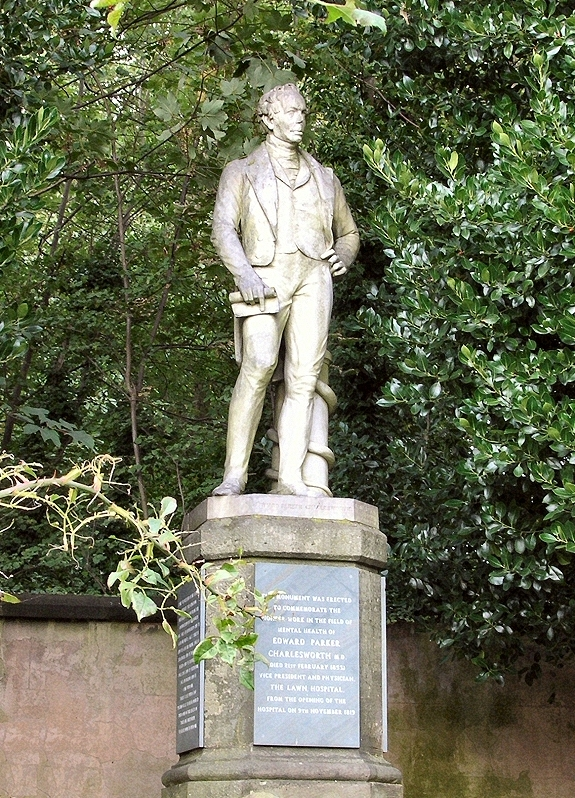
Statue of Edward Parker Charlesworth, in the grounds of The Lawn, Lincoln

== Life ==
He was son of John Charlesworth, rector of Ossington, Nottinghamshire, and was brother of John Charlesworth, the father of Maria Louisa Charlesworth. After a pupilage with Dr. Edward Harrison of Horncastle, he went to Edinburgh, where he graduated M.D. in 1807.

Charles settled at Lincoln, where he acquired a large practice, and became physician to the Lincoln county hospital. He died of paralysis, on 20 February 1853. Thomas Milnes made a statue of Charlesworth for Lincoln Asylum. Charlesworth was closely linked to the Lincoln Mechanics' Institute and served as its chairman for twenty years.

== Psychiatric practice ==
From 1820 Charlesworth was visiting physician to the Lincoln Asylum for the Insane. It was housed in a new building, completed in 1819, and was an independent institution, sharing its medical staff with the County Hospital.

Knowing Harrison's private asylum and its highly coercive methods of treating the insane, Charlesworth secured the issue of an order forbidding attendants to use medical restraint or violence without the consent of the directors. He supervised the structure and arrangements of the asylum, and secured in 1821 a classification of patients and opportunities for their exercise in the open air. In 1828 he obtained an order for the display of instruments of restraint, the destruction of some, and record-keeping of cases of coercion.

While a house surgeon named Hadwen was in office in 1834, for some weeks no patient was under restraint in the asylum. Robert Gardiner Hill was house surgeon from 1835 onwards, and mechanical restraint was practically abolished there.

== Influence ==
The experience of the Lincoln asylum influenced John Conolly in his abolition of restraint at Hanwell Asylum. Hill later claimed priority for the approach, and the matter of attribution of influence remained disputed. Conolly visited the York Retreat and the Lincoln asylum, and William Alexander Francis Browne had by then published on non-restraint.

== Works ==
In 1828 Charlesworth published Remarks on the Treatment of the Insane.

== Family ==
Charlesworth married a daughter of Dr. Rockcliffe of Horncastle.

== Notes ==
Attribution

This article incorporates text from a publication now in the public domain: Stephen, Leslie, ed. (1887). "Charlesworth, Edward Parker". Dictionary of National Biography. Vol. 10. London: Smith, Elder & Co.
