= Högbom Outcrops =

Landform in Antarctica

The Högbom Outcrops (80°15′S 24°52′W) are rocks rising to about 1,000 metres (3,300 ft) at the eastern side of the terminus of Schimper Glacier in the Herbert Mountains of the Shackleton Range, Antarctica. They were photographed from the air by the U.S. Navy, 1967, and surveyed by the British Antarctic Survey, 1968–71. In association with the names of glacial geologists grouped in this area, the feature was named in 1971 by the UK Antarctic Place-Names Committee after Arvid Högbom (1857–1940), a Swedish geologist who made important contributions to the glacial geology of northern Sweden.
