= John Charlesworth (abolitionist) =

Anglican clergyman and abolitionist (1782–1864)

John Charlesworth (1782–1864) was an English abolitionist and Anglican clergyman. He was a friend of Thomas Clarkson, and for many years lived in Flowton, Suffolk, not far from him.

John was the son of John Charlesworth (1752–1821), Rector of Ossington, Nottinghamshire. His brother was Edward Parker Charlesworth, a prominent physician and early psychiatrist. His daughter was Maria Louisa Charlesworth.

== Selected works ==
- 1833 Providential Deliverance; a narrative of facts. By a Clergyman. Ipswich: S. H. Cowell
- 1842 On affliction and spiritual distress. London: Hamilton, Adams & Co.
