= Warneford Hospital =

- Oxford Health NHS Foundation Trust
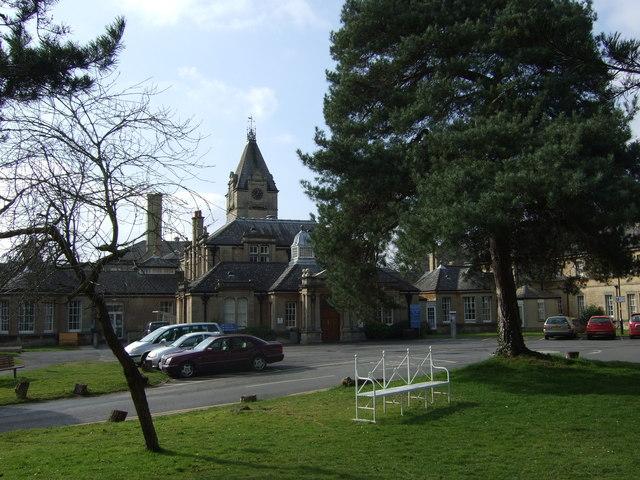
- Warneford Hospital

- Shown in Oxfordshire

Geography
- Location: Oxford, Oxfordshire, England, United Kingdom
- Coordinates: 51°45′03″N 1°13′21″W

Organisation
- Care system: Public NHS
- Type: Teaching
- Affiliated university: University of Oxford

Services
- Emergency department: No Accident & Emergency
- Beds: 104

History
- Founded: 1826

Links
- Website: https://www.oxfordhealth.nhs.uk
- Lists: Hospitals in England

The Warneford Hospital is a hospital providing mental health services at Headington in east Oxford, England. The hospital is managed by the Oxford Health NHS Foundation Trust.

As of 2026, the NHS trust is planning to redevelop the site in collaboration with the University of Oxford, building a new mental health hospital elsewhere on the site while converting the historic hospital building into a new college of the university, Radcliffe College.

== History ==
The hospital opened as the Oxford Lunatic Asylum in July 1826. It was designed by Richard Ingleman (1777–1838) and built of Headington stone. The name commemorates the philanthropist Samuel Wilson Warneford. It was renamed the Warneford Hospital in 1843 and extended by J.C. Buckler in 1852 and by William Wilkinson in 1877.

The hospital originally charged fees for treatment of middle-class patients with a fund eventually being set up for the care of poor patients. Men and women were originally segregated on different sides of the hospital with this practice continuing into the 1950s.

In 2023, Oxford Health NHS Foundation Trust announced plans to redevelop the site, building a new mental health hospital and turning the historic Grade II listed hospital building into a new graduate college of the University of Oxford, provisionally named Radcliffe College, which will focus on medicine, life sciences, and related disciplines. The planning application was submitted in August 2025, and in July 2026 Oxford City Council agreed to the main application, although conditions remain to be agreed with the council.

== Notable staff ==
- Anthony Storr, teaching post, 1974-84

== Notable patients ==
- Stephen Bernard, academic and writer
- Jennifer Dawson, novelist
- Elyn Saks, law professor

== See also ==
- List of hospitals in England
- Warneford Meadow
