= Mary Barkas =

New Zealand born psychiatrist and physician

- Drawing of Mary Barkas in 1924
- Born: 7 September 1889; Christchurch, New Zealand
- Died: 17 April 1959 (aged 69); Tapu, New Zealand
- Education: Victoria University College; King's College London; St Mary's Hospital, London; London School of Medicine for Women
- Occupations: Psychiatrist; Physician
- Years active: 1910s – 1932

Mary Rushton Barkas (7 September 1889 – 17 April 1959) was a psychiatrist, physician and author from New Zealand. She worked at the Bethlem Royal Hospital, where she was the first female house physician, and the Maudsley Hospital in London, United Kingdom.

== Early life ==
Mary Rushton Barkas was born in 1889 in Christchurch, New Zealand, to Frederick Barkas, who worked at the New Zealand Loan and Mercantile Agency Company, and Amy Barkas née Parker. She attended Christchurch Girls' High School and was the dux of the school in 1905. She went on to study at Victoria University College in Wellington, graduating with a BSc in 1908, and an MSc in 1910, and later studied under Carl Jung at King's College London. During the First World War, she studied medicine at St Mary's Hospital and the London School of Medicine for Women, graduating in 1918. At the outbreak of war she was in Switzerland on a tramping trip; it took several weeks to return to London. In 1922, Barkas travelled to Vienna to study for a graduate diploma, where she worked under Otto Rank.

== Career ==
In 1919, Barkas became the first female house physician at the Bethlem Royal Hospital. In 1923, Barkas was one of four full-time psychiatrists employed at the newly opened Maudsley Hospital, and she worked there until 1927. Her work focused upon organic psychiatry, psychoanalysis and child psychiatry, and she described the hospital as a "shelter and refuge" which offered "complete protection and satisfaction of all needs." From 1928 to 1933, Barkas worked as a Medical Superintendent at The Lawn Hospital in Lincoln. In this role, Barkas helped to reduce the expenditure of the hospital.

After her father died in 1932, Barkas retired and returned to New Zealand. She moved to Tapu, and studied Chinese philosophy. In 1937, she wrote the feminist book Wages for Wives, which challenged the stereotypical views of working women in New Zealand. In the same year, she was one of 15 psychologists who provided references for Arthur Segal's application for a British work permit.

== Death ==
Barkas died at Tapu near Thames on 17 April 1959, and was cremated at Purewa Cemetery on 20 April, although some accounts suggest she died in 1961.
