= Albert Charlesworth =

English cricketer

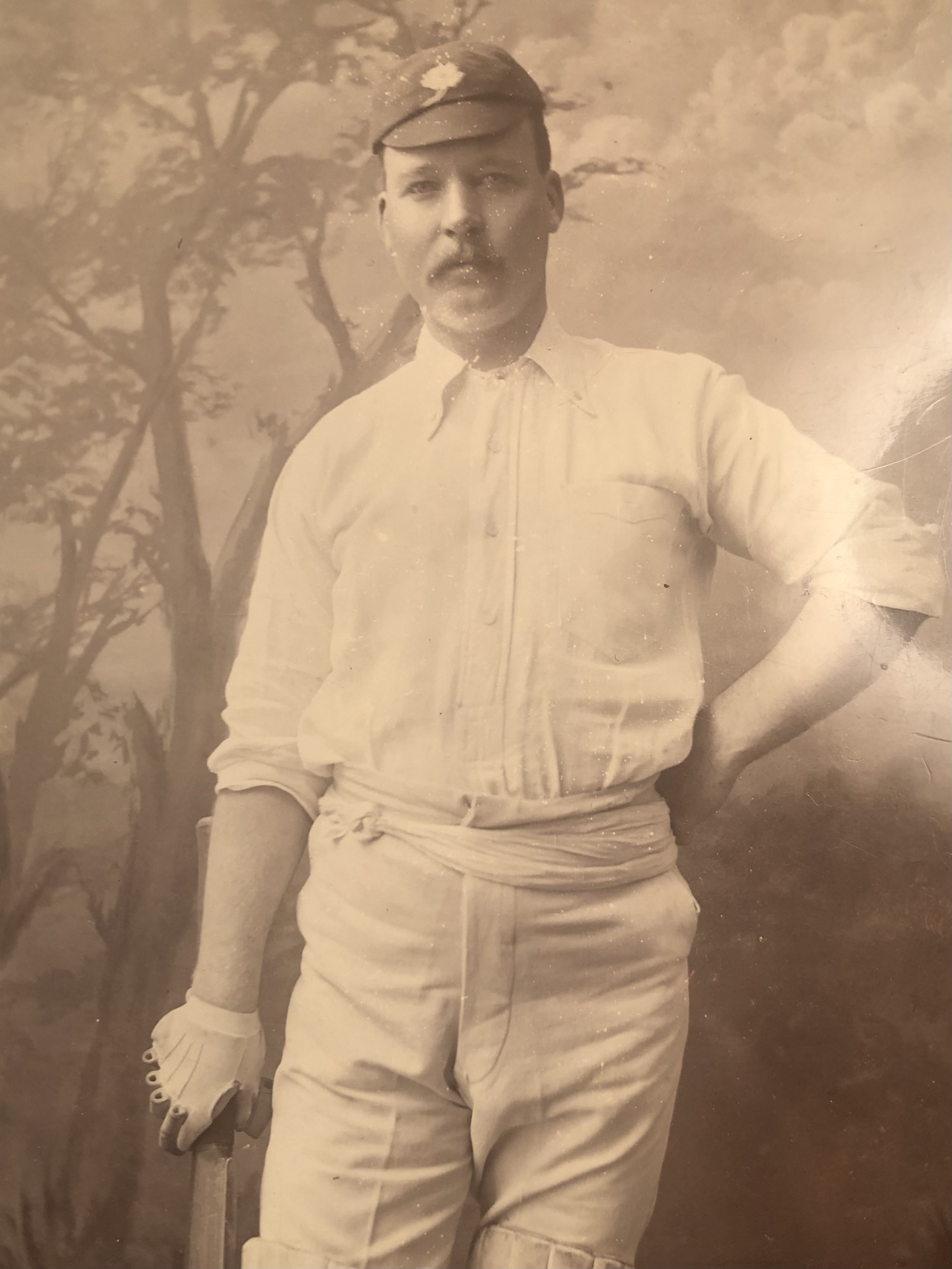
Albert Percy Charlesworth

Albert Percy Charlesworth (19 February 1865 – 11 May 1926) was an English first-class cricketer, who played seven matches for Yorkshire County Cricket Club between 1894 and 1895. He also appeared for Yorkshire's Second XI in 1893.

Born in Potternewton, Leeds, Yorkshire, England, Charlesworth was a right-handed batsman, who scored 241 runs at an average of 21.9, with a top score of 63 against Nottinghamshire.

He died, aged 61, in Hull. His son, Arthur Charlesworth, played football for Hull City A.F.C.
