= Flowton =

Village and civil parish in Suffolk, England

Coordinates: 52.08031°N 1.04006°E

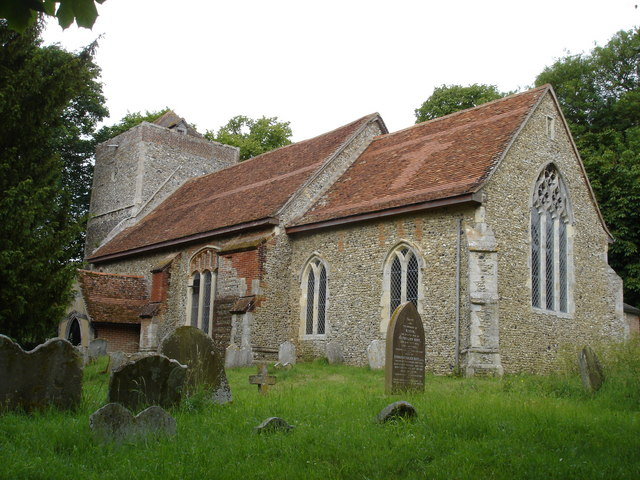
- Church of St Mary

- Location within Suffolk
- Population: 117 (2011 Census)
- OS grid reference: TM082468
- Civil parish: Flowton
- District: Mid Suffolk
- Shire county: Suffolk
- Region: East
- Country: England
- Sovereign state: United Kingdom
- Post town: Ipswich
- Postcode district: IP8
- Dialling code: 01473
- Police: Suffolk
- Fire: Suffolk
- Ambulance: East of England
- UK Parliament: Central Suffolk and North Ipswich

Flowton is a village and civil parish in the Mid Suffolk district of Suffolk in eastern England, with a population of 117 people. The name 'Flowton' originally derives from the word 'Flocctun', meaning a flock of sheep or a sheep farm. The parish is located around six miles north west of Ipswich, which is the county town of Suffolk. Flowton contains the hamlet of Flowton Brook, and consists of rural farmland accompanied by scattered farm houses and a few newer builds situated nearby the parish church of 'St Mary's'. In the 1870s, Flowton was described as:

"Flowton, a parish in Bosmere district, Suffolk; 3½ miles WNW of Bramford r. station, and 5½ NW by W of Ipswich. Post town, Bramford under Ipswich. Acres 495. Real property, £994. Pop., 151. Houses, 34. The property is divided among a few. The living is a rectory in the diocese of Norwich. Value, £140.* Patron, Henry Thornton, Esq. The church is good."

== St Mary's Church ==
Flowton's parish church, 'St Mary's' was built in the 13th century and has been a Christian place of worship for around 700 years. The church holds many fundraising events, gaining goodwill and financial support from the village, as well as from the wider population. St Mary's Church is a Grade I listed building, made of flint rubble walling with freestone dressings and buttressing. It consists of a nave, chance, south porch and west tower. Evidence from medieval mass can be seen east of the porch on buttresses where there are mass dials carved into the stone. These dials would have previously shown the villages the time at which the service would be held. Changes to the church have been made over the centuries with its most recent known addition being around the late 18th century when a vestry was added to the north of the chancel. It is thought that this vestry was used as a school room for the village children.

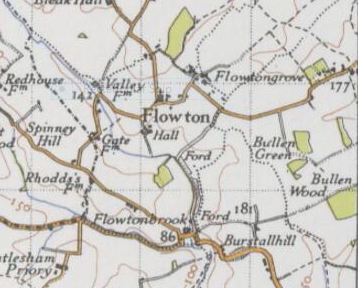
Historical Map from the 20th Century Showing the Civil Parish of Flowton

Rev. John Charlesworth (1782–1864), an evangelical Christian and abolitionist, was rector of Flowton, 1815–44.

== Manorial history ==
=== Flowton Priory ===
Flowton Priory was in the village of Flowton for 400 years, after being built in 1525. In 1928 it was moved brick by brick to Harpenden, Hertfordshire, after its owner, a wealthy family member, ordered it to be deconstructed and reassembled. In 1994, it was bought by racing driver, David Pinkney. "The great thing is that when it was moved, every beam, brick and tile was checked and made good. And it was put on solid foundations with a damp-proof course." It is listed as being a Grade II Tudor Mansion.

== Population Structure ==
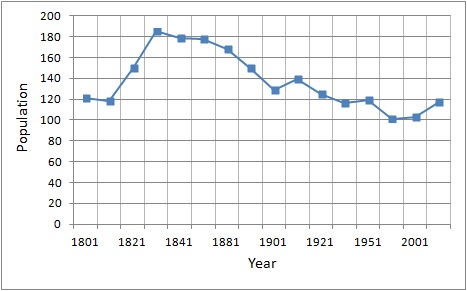
Total Population of Flowton Civil Parish, Suffolk, as reported by the Census of Population from 1801 to 2011

There is an irregular change in both Flowton's total population and the number of houses between 1831 and 1861. The population graph shows that there is an increase in the number of houses between 1831 and 1851, with a decrease in population. This is then followed by a further decline in population, along with a decrease in the number of houses in 1921. Flowton's population grows rapidly 1811 and 1831, it then remains fairly steady until 1851. Therefore, indicating that Flowton's community was developing, as there was also an increase in the number of houses. Both population and the number of houses declined in the early 1900s, with the population not considerably rising again until 2001.

== Employment ==
=== Occupational history ===
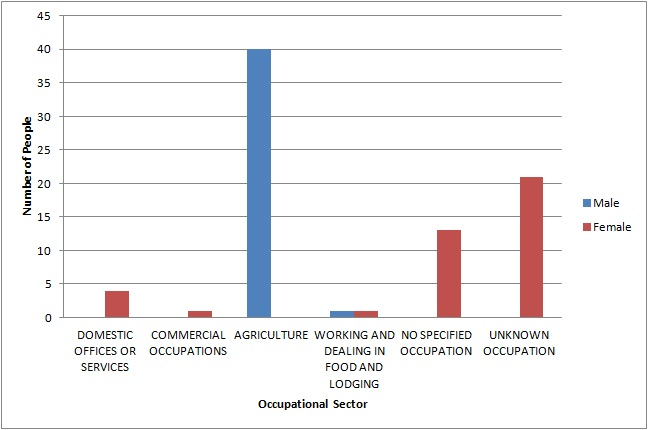
The occupations of male and female residents in Flowton in 1881, according to the 1881 Census Report

Flowton's employment throughout history has mainly been centred on the primary industry.Between 1500 and 1700 the main type of employment listed for Flowton was yeomen and husbandmen, meaning Flowton's land was cultivated by tenant farmers. By the early 1800s, 37 people were listed to work in agriculture and 3 in retail trade. However, by the mid-1800s there was detailed to be a bricklayer, corn miller and 7 farmers. The occupational graph shows that in 1881, the main source of Flowton's employment was in the agricultural industry. Women at the time were listed to have no specified occupation or an unknown occupation, suggesting they were involved in domestic duties or a form of assistance in a relatives business. The graph shows females were employed in a wider range of industries compared to males at the time, with only one male not being employed in agriculture.

=== Recent Occupational Structure ===
Flowton's traditional industry of agriculture still employs a small number of its population. However, census data collected in 2011 shows how the population of Flowton has diversified in terms of employment. Around a third of the population were employed in the manual labour industry in 2011, which now includes construction and mechanical work. Men are now employed within a total of nine census industry categories, whereas the graphs shows in 1881 they were only shown to be employed in two. A majority of Flowton's population in 2011 were employed in public sector work, such as health and social work, education, admin and financial. The most recent census data shows how female employment has changed since 1881. Women in 2011 were shown to be employed in a variety of industries, some of which would have traditional been seen as male orientated in 1881, such as in agriculture and construction.

== Flowton Community ==
Flowton's villagers often hold fundraising events, with its church often being at the centre of this. The village annually holds an open garden event, where visitors can walk around participating villagers gardens. Alongside this a flower festival takes place within the Church, both lasting two days. Flowton charges a small joint fee is for a ticket to both events. The church is also part of Suffolk historic churches trust annual cycle ride, where money is raised for its upkeep and maintenance.
