= The Lawn, Lincoln =

The Lawn
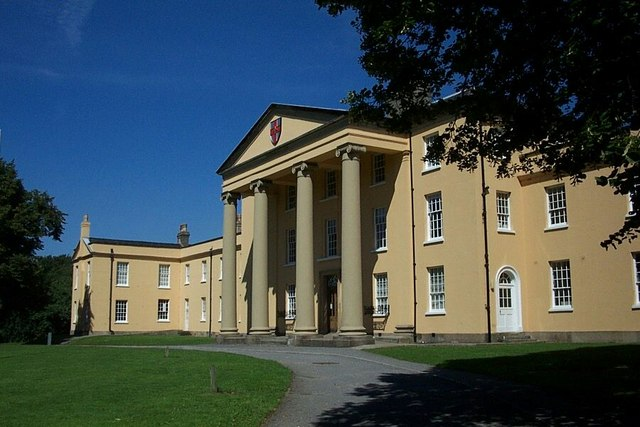
- The Lawn

- Shown in Lincolnshire

Geography
- Location: Lincoln, Lincolnshire, England
- Coordinates: 53°14′06″N 0°32′38″W

Organisation
- Care system: National Health Service
- Type: Mental health

History
- Founded: 1817
- Closed: 1985

Listed Building – Grade II*
- Official name: The Lawn
- Designated: 2 October 1969
- Reference no.: 1388819

Links
- Website: www.hpft.nhs.uk

The Lawn is an early 19th-century Greek revival building on Union Road, in Lincoln, Lincolnshire, England, 0.3 miles (0.5 km) to the west of Lincoln Cathedral. The complex features a walled garden and children's play area. The building, which is a Grade II* listed building, housed The Lawn Hospital for Mental and Nervous Diseases from 1921 until 1985.

== History ==
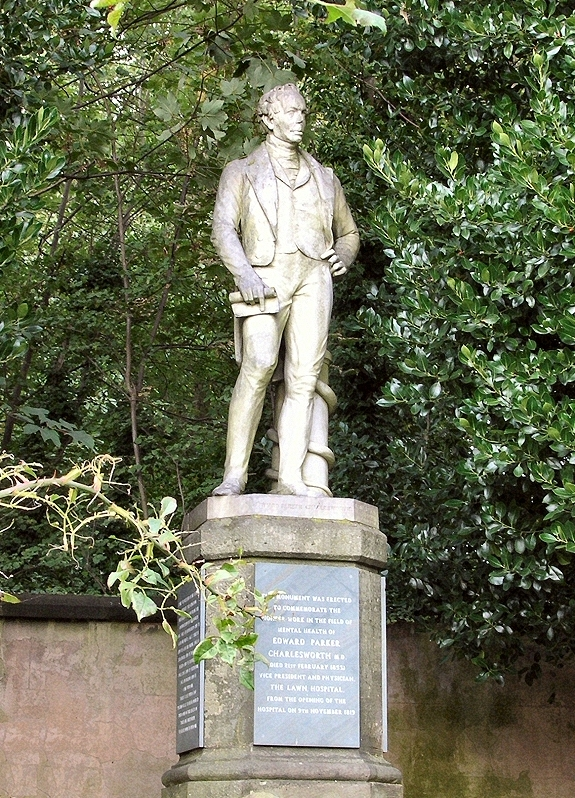
Statue of Edward Parker Charlesworth, physician and life governor of the hospital from 1820 until his death in 1853

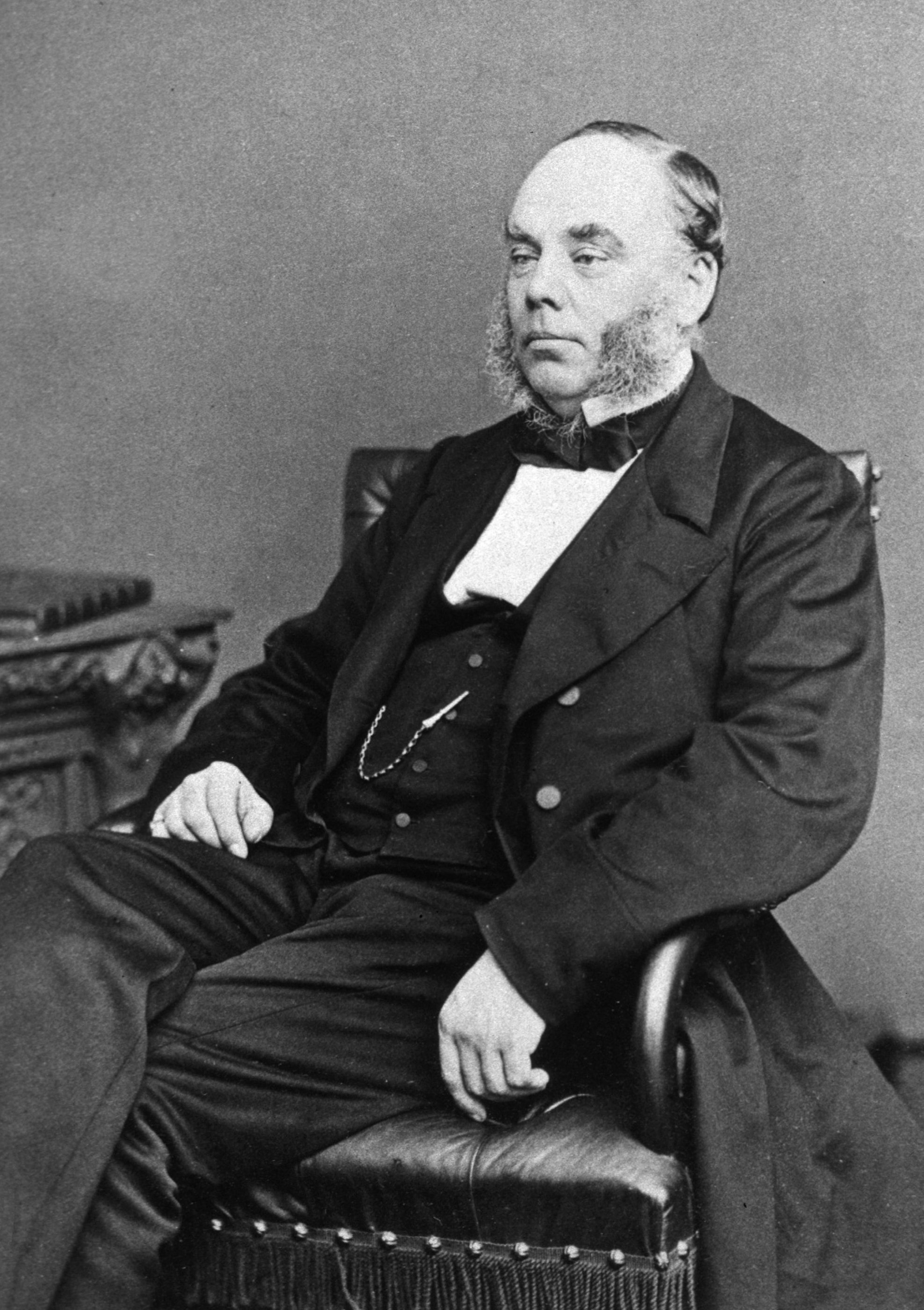
Robert Gardiner Hill

The hospital's origins lie in a bequest by Dr Paul Parnell to establish an asylum in Lincoln. After delay caused by indecision by the management of the asylum, the project went ahead in 1817, and a facility designed by Richard Ingleman in the Greek revival style opened as the Lincoln Lunatic Asylum in April 1820.

It was at the asylum that, in the 1830s, Robert Gardiner Hill, with the support of Edward Parker Charlesworth, pioneered a mode of treatment that suited "all types" of patients, so that mechanical restraints and coercion could be dispensed with—a situation he finally achieved in 1838. In 1839 Sergeant John Adams and John Conolly were impressed by the work of Hill, and introduced the method into their Hanwell Asylum, by then the largest in the country. Hill's system was adapted, since Conolly was unable to supervise each attendant as closely as Hill had done. By September 1839, mechanical restraint was no longer required for any patient.

The facility became known as the Lincoln Lunatic Hospital in 1905 and The Lawn Hospital in 1921.

Patients were to be "persons of the superior class who shall contribute to the general expense of the establishment according to their ability and persons in more limited circumstances whose payments shall be relieved, when an opportunity may offer, out of the disposable funds of the charity." Mary Barkas, a respected psychiatrist, worked as Medical Superintendent at the hospital between 1928 and 1933. The hospital joined the National Health Service in 1948 and, following the introduction of Care in the Community, closed in 1985.

City of Lincoln Council acquired the hospital and operated it as an events venue until August 2016 when it sold it to R. W. Stokes & Sons who have redeveloped the property as a new business headquarters, cafe, restaurant and theatre. A tropical glasshouse, the Sir Joseph Banks Conservatory, was moved from the site in late 2016.

== See also ==
- Weekend at the Asylum
