= Arnold Charlesworth =

English footballer

Personal information
- Full name: Arnold Charlesworth
- Date of birth: 6 July 1930
- Place of birth: Sheffield, West Riding of Yorkshire, England
- Date of death: 1972 (aged 41–42)
- Place of death: Retford, Nottinghamshire, England
- Height: 5 ft 11 in (1.80 m)
- Position: Inside forward

Senior career*
Years	Team	Apps	(Gls)
- Boston United
1952–1953	West Bromwich Albion	0	(0)
1953–1954	Rotherham United	0	(0)
1954–1955	York City	1	(0)
1955	Grantham	2	(0)
Total		3	(0)
- * Club domestic league appearances and goals

Arnold Charlesworth (6 July 1930 – 1972) was an English professional footballer who played as an inside forward in the Football League for York City, in non-League football for Boston United and Grantham, and was on the books of West Bromwich Albion and Rotherham United without making a league appearance.
