= Violet Charlesworth =

British fraudster (1884–after 1912)

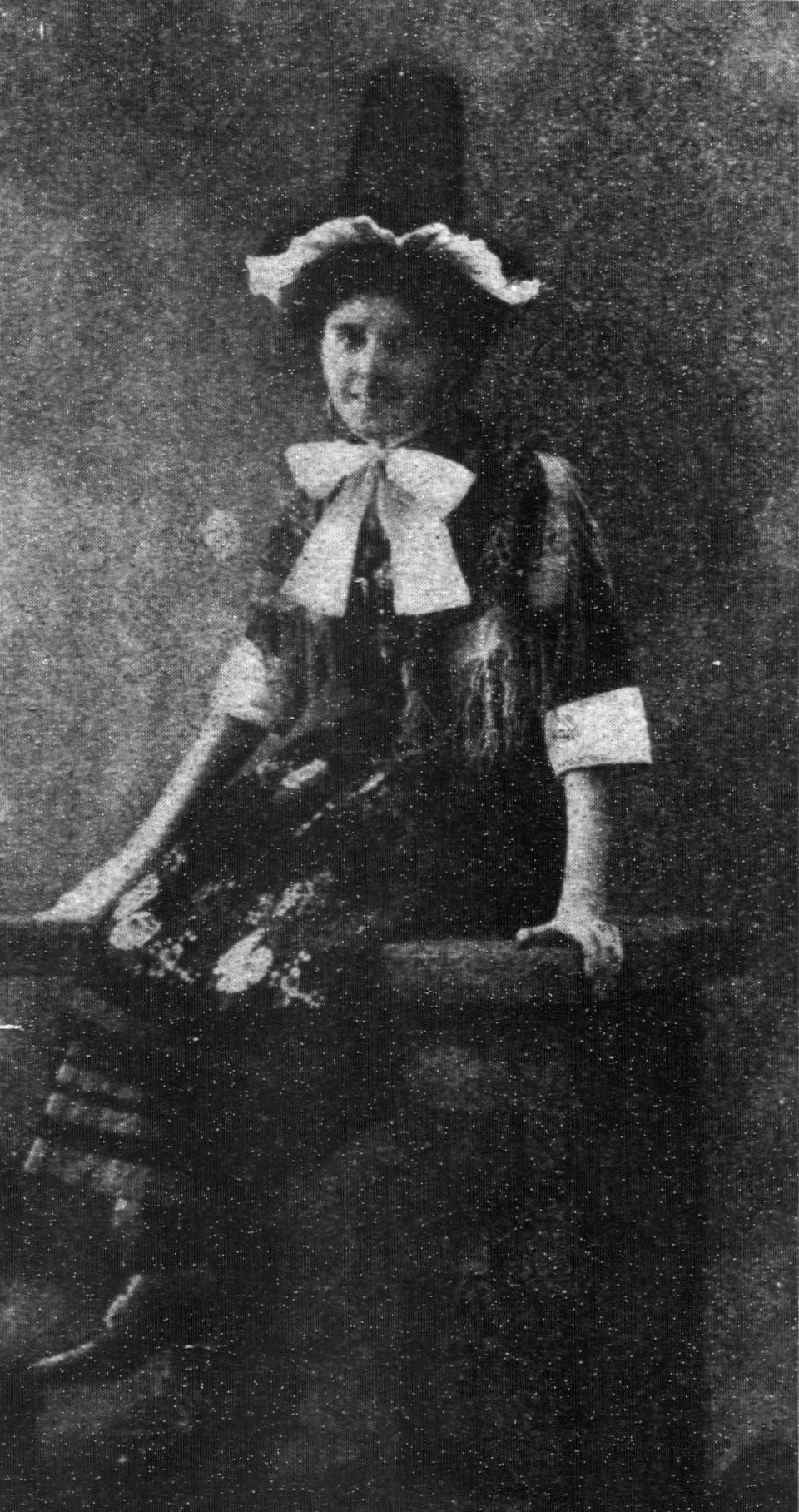
Violet Charlesworth depicted in a 1909 newspaper.

May Charlesworth, known as Violet Charlesworth (January 1884 – after 1912) was a British fraudster who gained notoriety in the early 20th century for financial deception and faking her own death.

== Early life ==
Charlesworth was born in Stafford in January 1884. She was the youngest of at least four children. She lived with her mother, Miriam Charlesworth, and together they were involved in various financial schemes.

== Fraud and deception ==
Charlesworth defrauded several people by falsely claiming to be an heiress who would soon inherit a substantial fortune. On the basis of this fabricated identity, she obtained loans and goods on credit. Her charm and apparent social standing enabled her to manipulate numerous victims, who believed her inheritance was imminent. The fraud extended over several years and involved numerous creditors.

On 2 January 1909, it was reported that Charlesworth had died in a car accident near Penmaenmawr in North Wales. According to initial accounts, she had fallen over a cliff, and her body was presumed to have been swept away by the sea. The story received extensive media coverage and attracted public sympathy.

However, suspicions soon arose due to inconsistencies in witness statements and the absence of a body. A police investigation revealed that the accident had been staged. Charlesworth was eventually discovered alive in Oban, Scotland.

== Trial and imprisonment ==
Charlesworth and her mother were arrested and charged with obtaining money under false pretences. Their trial took place in 1910. Both women were found guilty, and in July 1910, Violet Charlesworth was sentenced to five years' penal servitude. Miriam Charlesworth received the same sentence. The judge later reconsidered and reduced their sentences to three years. An appeal against the sentence was dismissed.

The case drew widespread public and media attention, not only in the United Kingdom but also internationally, particularly due to the dramatic nature of the fake death and the involvement of a young woman in such an elaborate fraud.

She was released from prison in February 1912 and returned to Scotland, but nothing is known of her later life.
