= Barry Charlesworth =

English rugby league footballer

Playing information
Club
Years	Team	Pld	T	G	FG	P
1964–66	Castleford	22	2	0	0	6

Barry Charlesworth is a former professional rugby league footballer who played in the 1960s. He played at club level for Castleford.

== Playing career ==
=== County League appearances ===
Barry Charlesworth played in Castleford's victory in the Yorkshire League during the 1964–65 season.
