= Charlesworth Cliffs =

Cliffs in Antarctica

The Charlesworth Cliffs (80°14′S 25°18′W) are a series of steep cliffs near the north end of the central ridge of the Herbert Mountains, Shackleton Range. They were photographed from the air by the U.S. Navy, 1967, and surveyed by the British Antarctic Survey, 1968–1971. In association with the names of glacial geologists grouped in this area, they were named by the UK Antarctic Place-Names Committee after John K. Charlesworth (1889–1972), Irish geologist; Professor of Geology, Queen's University Belfast, 1921–1954; author of The Quaternary Era, With Special Reference to its Glaciation, London, 1957.
