= John Harwood Hill =

English antiquarian

- Born: 1809; Louth, Lincolnshire
- Died: 1886 (aged 76–77); Cranoe, Leicestershire
- Occupation: Antiquarian

John Harwood Hill (1809 – 3 December 1886) was an English antiquarian.

== Biography ==
Hill was the son of Robert Hill of Leamington. He was born at Louth, Lincolnshire in 1809. Robert Gardiner Hill [q. v.] was a younger brother. On 30 June 1830, he was admitted a pensioner of Peterhouse, Cambridge, graduated B.A. in 1834, and in the same year was ordained to the curacy of Glaston, Rutlandshire, removing in 1835 to that of Corby, Northamptonshire, and becoming librarian to Lord Cardigan at Deene. He compiled a black-letter catalogue of Deene library, with pen-and-ink etchings of his own. In 1837, he was appointed by Lord Cardigan rector of Cranoe, and by the lord chancellor in 1841 vicar of Welham, both near Market Harborough, Leicestershire. In August 1846, the church of Cranoe was much damaged in a storm, and through Hill's exertions a new church was built in 1849 by subscription. The church of Welham was also restored during his incumbency, and in 1838 the rectory-house at Cranoe was rebuilt, largely at his expense. Hill was appointed surrogate for the diocese of Peterborough in 1852. On 12 Jan. 1871 he was elected F.S.A. He died on 3 December 1886 at Cranoe, aged 77. By his wife, who died on 1 Oct. 1874, aged 58, he had a large family. Hill was author of:

‘The Chronicle of the Christian Ages, or Record of Events Ecclesiastical, Civil, and Military … to the end of … 1858,’ &c., 2 vols. 8vo, Uppingham (1859). ‘History of the Parish of Langton,’ and of several parishes in the hundred of Gartree, 4to, Leicester, 1867, illustrated with etchings by his own hand. This work was originally designed to aid by its sale the erection of a new church at Tor Langton. ‘The History of Market Harborough, with that portion of the Hundred of Gartree, Leicestershire, containing the parishes of Baggrave, Billesdon, Bosworth,’ &c., Leicester, 1875, 4to, privately printed, illustrated with etchings by the author. Hill was the local secretary of the Leicestershire Architectural and Archæological Society, and to its ‘Transactions’ he supplied many articles, of which the most remarkable were on the families of Langton, on Tailbois's ‘Memoirs of the Archdeacons of Leicester,’ and on the prebendaries of St. Margaret's, Leicester.
