= Maria Louisa Charlesworth =

English writer (1819–1880)

Maria Louisa Charlesworth (1 October 1819 – 16 October 1880) was an English author of children's religious books and religious tracts.

== Life ==
Maria Louisa Charlesworth was born 1 October 1819 at The Rectory, Blakenham Parva, Suffolk. She was the daughter of Elizabeth Charlesworth (née Beddome, 1783–1869) and the Revd. John Charlesworth B.D. (1782-1864), an Evangelical clergyman, who was Rector of Flowton, Suffolk when Maria was born. He later became Rector of St Mildred, Bread Street, a London parish where Maria lived with him in the Rectory, at St Nicholas Olave. As a visitor to the poor in her father's parishes from a young age, Maria drew on these experiences for her first book, The Female Visitor to the Poor (1846), as well as for her most popular publication, the fictionalised Ministering Children (1854) and its sequel published in 1867. Set in a town modelled on Ipswich, Ministering Children circulated over 300,000 copies during her lifetime and was designed to teach children by example. It was especially popular as a 'Reward Book' for Sunday School prizes and was also translated into French, German and Swedish.

On her father's death in 1864 Maria Charlesworth lived for a while with her brother, the Revd. Samuel Beddome Charlesworth, who was Rector of St Anne's, Limehouse. She established St Stephen's ragged school and a mission in Bermondsey.

In 1864 she retired to Nutfield in Surrey, where she lived at Church Hill House with her elderly mother who died in 1869.

She is credited with persuading the Reverend Francis Pocock, a former curate to the Bishop of Sierra Leone, to establish Monkton Combe School, near Bath, Somerset in 1868, to educate boys to become missionaries. Her three nephews were among Pocock's first pupils: none of the three entered the church or became missionaries.

Maria died in Nutfield, Surrey, on Saturday 16 October 1880, aged 61 and was buried at St Peter & St Paul, Nutfield on 21 October 1880. Her brother conducted her burial service. She left an estate valued at almost £6000 with her brother as sole executor.

== Selected works ==
- The Female Visitor to the Poor, 1846 (later revised and published as The Cottage and its Visitor, 1856)
- A Book for the Cottage: the History of Mary and her Family, 1848
- Letters to a Child, 1849 - also The Beautiful Home, and other Letters to a Child.
- Letters to a Friend under Affliction, 1849
- The Light of Life, 1850
- Sunday Afternoons in the Nursery: familiar narratives from the Book of Genesis, 1853 (selected chapters from this were published as Reward Books)
- Ministering Children, a tale dedicated to childhood, 1854. Different stories from this book were also published as separate volumes, including Patience or, the Sunshine of the Heart; Ruth and Patience; The Blind Man's Child; Ruth and Little Jane or, Blossoms of the Heart; Charley and Edith or, How two selfish children were made a blessing to a lame boy and others
- The Basket Maker's Shop: a sequel to Ministering Children
- Africa's Mountain Valley: the Church in Regent's Town, West Africa, 1856
- The Sabbath given, the Sabbath lost, 1856
- The Ministry of Life, 1858
- India and the East, or a Voice from the Zenana, 1860
- England's Yeomen, or Life in a Farm in the Nineteenth Century, 1861 (the title of this publication is widely but incorrectly quoted both in the Dictionary of National Biography and on the internet as "From Life in the Nineteenth Century")
- The Sailor's Choice: Little Lenny's friends on the shore. Enlarged from The Ministry of Life, 1863
- Nurse Brame: or, how a cold heart was warmed by learning to feel for others, 1866
- Ministering Children: A Sequel, 1867
- The Last Command of Jesus Christ, 1869
- Where Dwellest Thou? or the Inner Home, 1871
- Eden and Heaven, 1872
- Oliver of the Mill: a tale, 1876
- The Old Looking-Glass, or Mrs. Dorothy Cope's Recollections of Service, 1878, reprinted as *The Broken Looking-glass, 1880
- Sunday Afternoons in the Nursery, or Familiar Narratives from the Book of Genesis, 1885.
- Heavenly Counsel in daily portions: Readings on the Gospel of St. Matthew. Being notes from the bible classes of M. L. Charlesworth. Edited by H[arriet] Maria Barclay, 1883.
- They Too: Elija and Elisha. Being addresses by Maria Louisa Charlesworth. Edited by H M Barclay, 1885
