= Jackson Tooth =

Nunatak in Coats Land, Antarctica

Jackson Tooth (80°25′S 23°16′W) is a nunatak rising to 1,215 metres (3,990 ft) at the western end of Pioneers Escarpment, in the Shackleton Range, Antarctica. In association with the names of pioneers of polar life and travel grouped in this area, it was named by the UK Antarctic Place-Names Committee in 1971 after Major Frederick George Jackson, an English Arctic explorer who in 1895 designed the features of the pyramid tent, later to become standard equipment on British polar expeditions.
