= Arthur Charlesworth =

English footballer

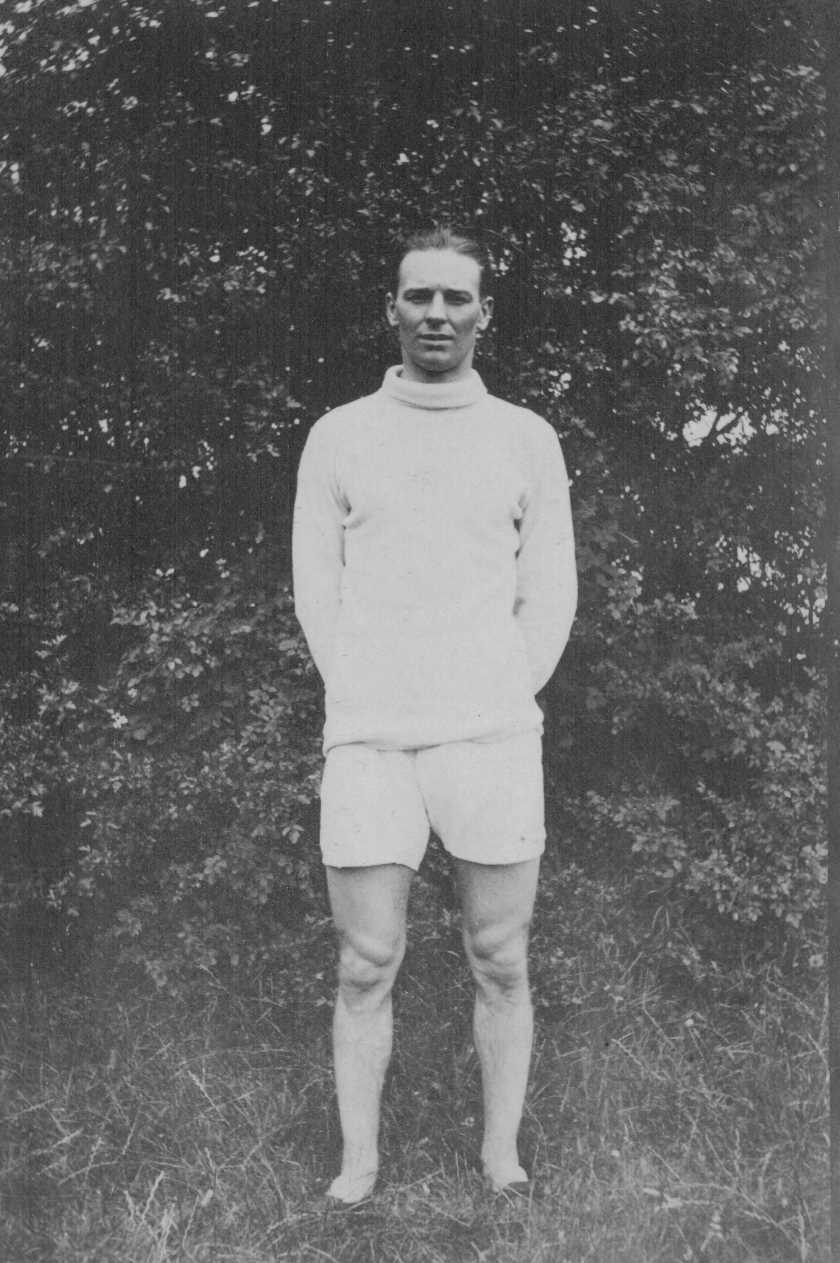

Personal information
- Full name: Arthur Charlesworth
- Date of birth: 4 February 1898
- Place of birth: Morley, England
- Date of death: 4 January 1966 (aged 67–68)
- Place of death: Kingston upon Hull
- Position: Striker

Senior career*
Years	Team	Apps	(Gls)
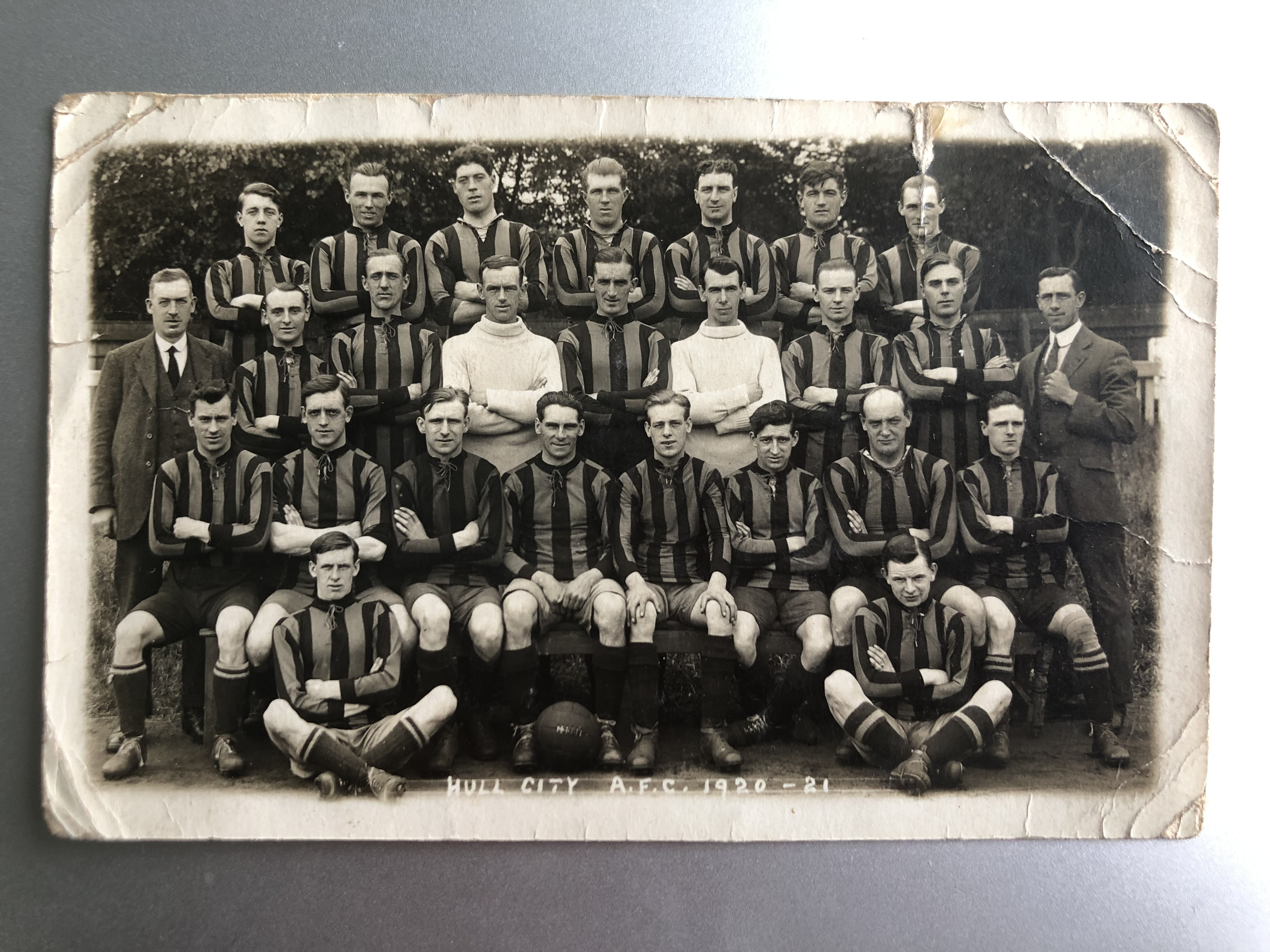
1918–1921	Hull City Hull City A.F.C 1920-1921 Arthur Charlesworth second row from top, third from right	15	(7)

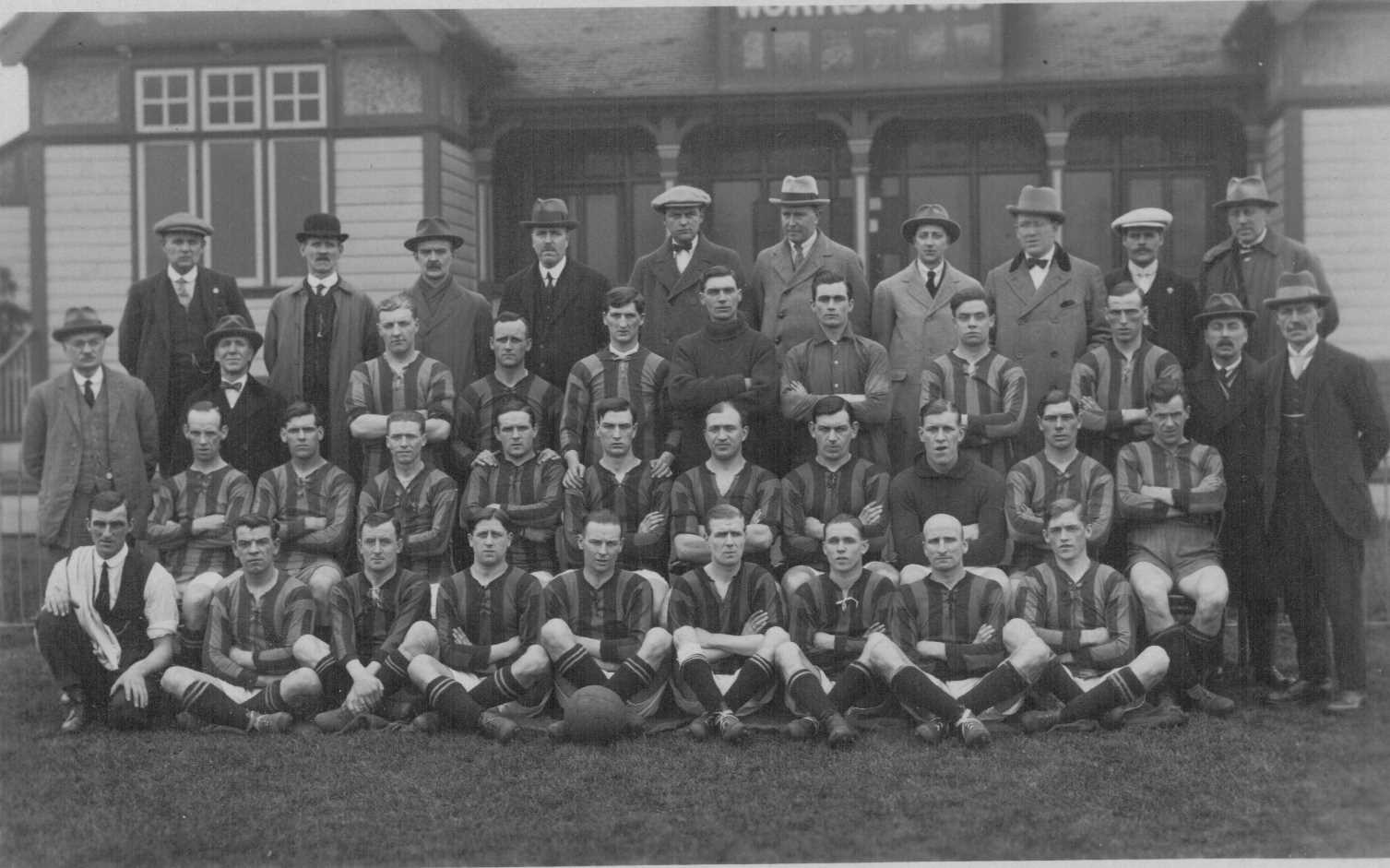
1921–1922	Worksop Town Arthur Charlesworth (seated behind ball)- Unknown team- Could be Worksop Town or Hull City- Contributor- Robert SC Kemp (grandson)- 2014-05-08 15-42	?	(?)
1922–1923	Doncaster Rovers	?	(?)
1923–1924	York City	33	(14)
- * Club domestic league appearances and goals

Arthur Charlesworth (4 February 1898 – 4 January 1966) was an English footballer.

Charlesworth played for Hull City, Worksop Town, Doncaster Rovers and York City. He was the son of Albert Percy Charlesworth, who played first class cricket for Yorkshire County Cricket Club.
