= Bernhardi Heights =

Bernhardi Heights (80°20′S 25°0′W) is a line of heights to 1,220 metres (4,000 ft), snow-covered to east but with a west-facing rock escarpment, rising east of Schimper Glacier in the Herbert Mountains, Shackleton Range. They were photographed from the air by the U.S. Navy in 1967, and they were surveyed by the British Antarctic Survey between 1968 and 1971. In association with the names of glacial geologists grouped in this area, they were named by the UK Antarctic Place-Names Committee in 1971 after Reinhard Bernhardi, a German geologist who in 1832 first recognized the moraines and erratics of north Germany as evidence of a former south extension of the Arctic ice sheet.
