= John Kaye Charlesworth =

British geologist (1889–1972)

Professor John Kaye Charlesworth CBE FRSE FRGS FGS MRIA

Professor of Geology, Queen's University of Belfast
- In office 1921–1954

Personal details
- Born: 3 January 1889 Leeds, England
- Died: 26 January 1972 (aged 83) Ballycastle, County Antrim, Northern Ireland
- Occupation: Geologist

John Kaye Charlesworth (3 January 1889 – 26 January 1972) was a British geologist and academic author. He was an expert in the geology of Northern Ireland.

== Life ==
He was born in Leeds on 3 January 1889, the son of George Charlesworth.

He graduated BSc from Leeds University in 1910. He began lecturing in Geology in 1914 at Queen's University, Belfast, but then undertook postgraduate studies, first in London, then travelling to what was then Breslau in Germany (now Wrocław in Poland) where he obtained a PhD in Geology. Back in Leeds he was awarded a DSc in 1921 and then briefly transferred to Manchester University as a Senior Lecturer, before returning to Queen’s University in Belfast as a full Professor. He held the latter role from 1921 until 1954.

He was elected a Fellow of the Royal Society of Edinburgh in 1950 and was awarded their Neill Prize for the period 1951-53.

He was made a Commander of the Order of the British Empire (CBE) in the 1957 New Year Honours for his services to Northern Ireland with particular reference to the field of geology.

He died in Ballycastle, County Antrim in Northern Ireland.

== Family ==
He married Janet Cumming Gibson in 1922 and had two children - Marian Louise Kaye who married Derek Lyddon; and Henry Alexander Kaye Charlesworth who married Jacqueline Davidson and was also a geologist.

== Publications ==
Charlesworthy was a regular contributor of articles to the Journal of the Geological Society. He also published the following:

- The Glacial Retreat of Iar Connacht (1929)
- Geological Observations on the Origins of Irish Flora and Fauna (1930)
- Geology of Ireland (1953)
- The Quaternary Era (1957)
- Geology Around the University Towns: North-East Ireland (1960)
- A Historical Geology of Ireland (1963)
