= William Barry Lord =

British author

WIlliam Barry Lord
- Born: 1825; United Kingdom
- Died: 2 April 1884 (aged 58–59)
- Known for: Author, Royal Regiment of Artillery

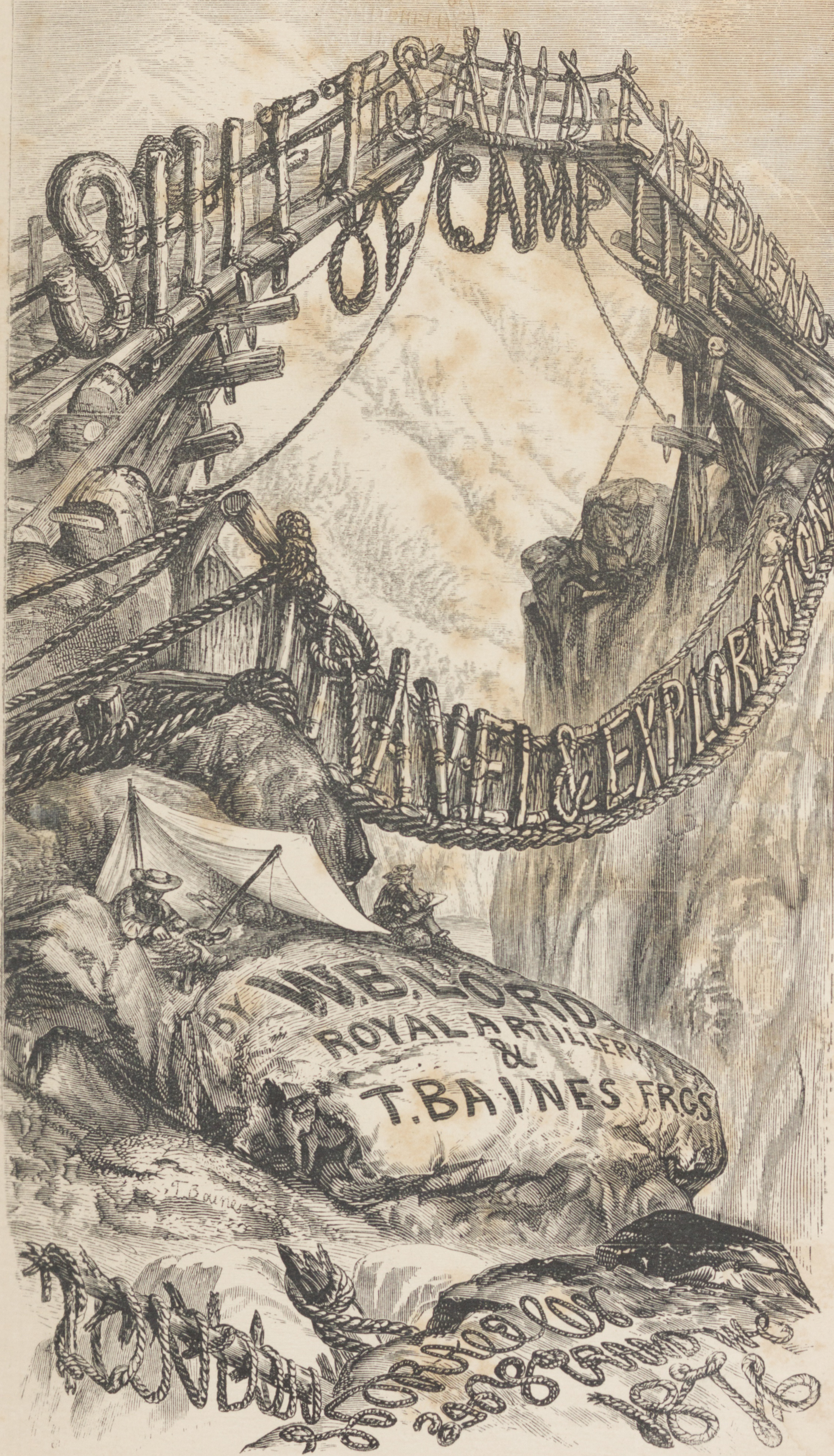
Frontispiece, Shifts and expedients of camp life, travel, and exploration, 1876.

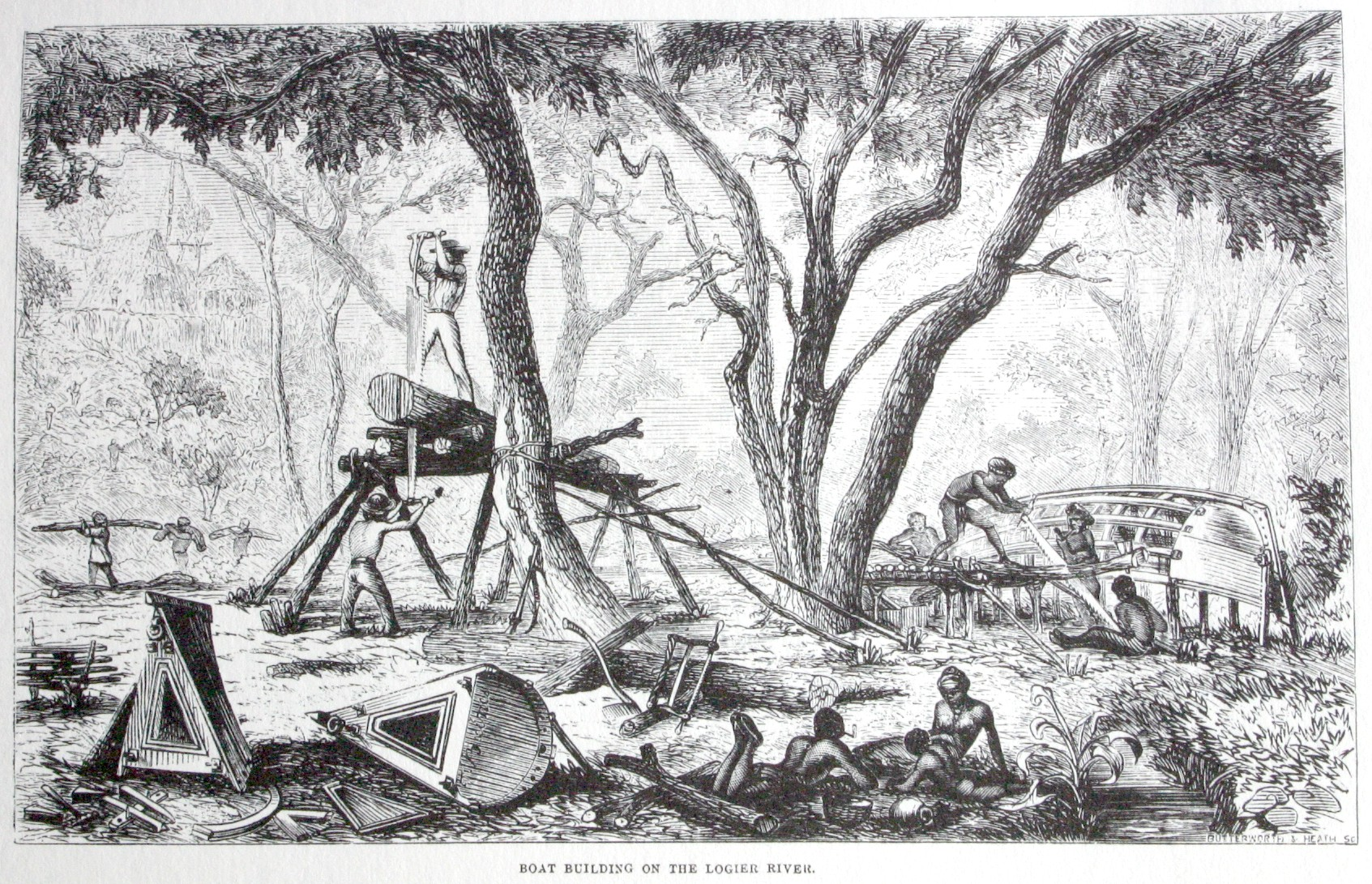
Plate from Shifts and Expedients

William Barry Lord (1825 – 2 April 1884) was a British author.

Lord joined the 9th Brigade of the Royal Regiment of Artillery on 18 October 1854 as a veterinary surgeon, and was retired on half-pay in May 1864. He served in the Crimean War, was present at Sebastopol and served in central India. He also travelled in Asia and Canada.

Lord was a man of catholic interests. His articles contributed to Nature and Art show a wide range of subject matter – mackerel, fishing, lithographic stone, silkworms, sandgrouse, metallurgy, bamboo, flying fish, nuts, the backroads of London, tin, fir cones, palms and plants, and a host of other topics that piqued his interest.

The British Museum catalogue lists nine books written by Lord. The best-known of these is Shifts and Expedients of Camp Life, Travel and Exploration first published in 1868 in serial form, and lavishly illustrated with woodcuts and text contributions by Thomas Baines and engraved by Butterworth & Heath. This manual of survival in the wild, was a 19th-century equivalent of the Whole Earth Catalogue, and still retains its usefulness in the 21st century as an encyclopaedia of practical living. Guides to travelling featuring useful hints were quite fashionable at the time when Livingstone, Speke, Burton and Stanley were household names. Francis Galton wrote The Art of Travel in 1855 and subtitled it Shifts and Contrivances available in Wild Countries. For anyone having to manage without the luxuries of the modern urban society, "Shifts and Expedients" provides detailed instructions on 'wagons and boats, horses and oxen, tents and firearms, hunting and fishing, observing and collecting, carpentry and metal-working, camping requisites, bush cuisine, medical improvisation, the best ways to cross rivers, to move heavy objects and to build huts.'

Four of Lord's books deal with sea-fishing, two are on mining in Ireland, one has a self-explanatory title The Key to Fortune in New Lands, and the last Diamonds and Gold:the three main routes to the South African Ophir. This last book is particularly enigmatic since Lord is not known to have visited South Africa.

His brother John Keats Lord was also an author who wrote about similar topics. Lord died at his residence in Paignton, Devon, aged 58.

== Books ==
- Shifts and expedients of camp life, travel, and exploration, WB Lord, illustrator T Baines, London : H. Cox, 1876, online State Library of New South Wales, DSM/910.4/3586
- Sea fish & how to catch them London, Bradbury and Evans (1863)
- Crab, shrimp, and lobster lore : gathered amongst the rocks at the sea-shore, by the riverside, and in the forest London : G. Routledge, (1867)
- Freaks of Fashion: The Corset & the Crinoline Ward, Locke, and Tyler (1868)
