= Poldervaart =

Poldervaart is a surname. Notable people with the surname include:

- Adrie Poldervaart (born 1970), Dutch football player and manager
- Arie Poldervaart (1918–1964), Dutch petrologist
- Michel Poldervaart (born 1988), Dutch football player

== Other ==
- Poldervaart Edge, escarpment in Coats Land, Antarctica, named after Arie
