= Mathys Bank =

Mathys Bank (80°19′S 28°30′W) is a rock ridge rising to about 750 metres (2,500 ft), located 2.5 nautical miles (5 km) southwest of Mount Etchells in the La Grange Nunataks, Shackleton Range, Antarctica. It was photographed from the air by the U.S. Navy, 1967, and surveyed by the British Antarctic Survey (BAS), 1968–71. It was named by the UK Antarctic Place-Names Committee after Nicholas Mathys, BAS general assistant at Halley Station, 1967–69, who worked in the Shackleton Range in summer 1968–69.
