= True Hills =

Hills in Antarctica

True Hills (80°12′S 26°51′W) is a rock hills 1 nautical mile (1.9 km; 1.2 mi) southeast of Wiggans Hills, rising to 850 m and marking the northeast end of La Grange Nunataks, Shackleton Range. Photographed from the air by the U.S. Navy, 1967, and surveyed by British Antarctic Survey (BAS), 1968–1971. Named by the United Kingdom Antarctic Place-Names Committee (UK-APC) after Anthony True, BAS surveyor, Halley Station, 1968–1970, who worked in Shackleton Range.
