= Arthur Lewis Hall =

British geologist (1872–1955)

Arthur Lewis Hall FRS
- Born: 10 January 1872; Birmingham, England
- Died: 13 August 1955 (aged 83); Pretoria, South Africa
- Education: University of Cambridge (BA, 1899); University of Cambridge (Sc.D, 1925)
- Known for: Work on the Bushveld Igneous Complex, South Africa
- Awards: Murchison Medal (1930); Draper Memorial Medal (1932)
- Scientific career
- Fields: Geology

Arthur Lewis Hall FRS (10 January 1872 – 13 August 1955) was a British geologist, who worked in South Africa for most of his career. He was awarded the Murchison Medal of the Geological Society of London in 1930 for his work on the Bushveld Igneous Complex, and elected to the Royal Society in 1935.

== Early life and education ==
Hall was born in Birmingham, to William Hall and Mary Ann (née Smith). At an early age he moved to Germany. He went to school in Freiburg, Bonn, Schwehn, Westphalia and finally to the Real Gymnasium, Kassel. At the age of 19 he won a scholarship to study at University College, Bristol. In 1896, Hall went to Gonville and Caius College, Cambridge, and graduated with first class honours in geology in 1899. That summer he went to Wales to learn geological surveying with Philip Lake, a physical geographer who was later a lecturer in Cambridge. Hall then spent two terms in Cambridge as assistant demonstrator in mineralogy, working for the professor of mineralogy W J Lewis.

== Career ==
In 1900, Hall joined Dulwich College as a science teacher; a post he held for two years. After the end of the Boer war in 1902, Hall joined the Geological Survey of the Transvaal as a geologist. He arrived in Pretoria in January 1903, and spent the next 29 years of his career working as a geologist in South Africa. At the time of his retirement in 1932, Hall was assistant director of the Geological Survey of South Africa.

Hall's geological work included mapping of the rocks outcropping across the vast Bushveld complex – an area that is now recognised as a classic example of a layered intrusion, and which represents the solidified remains of an ancient magma system. Hall's work also extended to studies of the mineralisation and mineral potential of the Bushveld complex, and mapping of the gold mining district of Barberton. Hall's annual reports to the geological survey of the Transvaal documented the ground he covered in his work each year. Between 1904 and 1911, he mapped 10,622 miles of geological boundaries across 16,388 square miles of countryside and covered 17,479 miles, mostly on foot. In 1922, Hall and Gustaaf Molengraaff helped to guide the Shaler Memorial Expedition team of Reginald Daly, Charles Palache and F E Wright to the Bushveld complex. This expedition drew attention to extraordinary nature of the Bushveld complex, and to the work that had already been done there by Molengraaf and Hall over the previous two decades. In 1932, Hall published his memoir on the Bushveld, which stretched to more than 550 pages.

Hall was nominated for fellowship of the Royal Society in December 1932, in recognition of his work mapping the igneous complex of the Bushveld, and its metamorphic effects; and for his work on gold-fields and the metal ores of South Africa. Hall was proposed by Arthur Rogers, director of the geological survey of South Africa, supported by geologists including OT Jones, Alfred Harker, Albert Seward and John Flett. He was elected as a fellow in 1935.

After retirement from the geological survey at the age of 60, Hall continued to work as a consulting geologist. He also published a vast compendium of analyses of rocks, minerals, ores, coal, soils and waters from southern Africa, and updates to his series of monographs on the bibliography of South African geology, until his failing eyesight meant that he had to stop.

== Awards ==
Hall's work was widely recognised during his career. He was awarded the ScD degree from Cambridge University in 1925. He was the first recipient of the Draper Memorial Medal of the Geological Society of South Africa in 1932. Hall was awarded the Murchison Medal in 1930, and was elected to the Royal Society in 1935.

== Personal life ==
Outside his work, Hall was a proficient violinist, who regularly performed both chamber music and in orchestras. He was also a regular supporter of classical music concerts in Pretoria. According to his biographer Sidney H. Haughton, Hall 'wasted no time with the helpless amateur or the pretentious professional' in either geology, or music.

Hall married Rosalie Powell, from Clifton, Bristol, in August 1900. They had a daughter and three sons. Two of Hall's sons died before him.

== Selected publications ==
- Hall, A.L. (1918) The Geology of the Barberton Gold Mining District, including adjoining portion of Northern Swaziland. Memoirs of the geological survey of South Africa, 9.
- Hall, A.L. (1924) A Subject Index to the Literature on the Geology and Mineral Resources of South Africa. Memoirs of the geological survey of South Africa, 22.
- Hall, A.L. (1932) The Bushveld Igneous Complex of the Central Transvaal. Memoirs of the geological survey of South Africa, 28, 554 pp.
- Hall, A.L. (1937) A bibliography of South African geology for the years 1931–1935 (inclusive). Memoirs of the geological survey of South Africa, 30, 160 pp. Continuation of memoirs 18, 22, 25 and 27.
- Hall, A.L. (1938) Analyses of rocks, minerals, ores, coal, soils and waters from Southern Africa. Memoirs of the geological survey of South Africa, 32, 868 pp.
