= Butterfly Knoll =

Nunatak in Coats Land, Antarctica

Butterfly Knoll (80°20′S 28°9′W) is one of the La Grange Nunataks, located 4.5 nautical miles (8 km) southwest of Mount Beney in the Shackleton Range. It was photographed from the air by the U.S. Navy, 1967, and surveyed by the British Antarctic Survey, 1968–71. It was named by the UK Antarctic Place-Names Committee from its resemblance in plan view to a butterfly.
