= Maufe =

Maufe is a surname. Notable people with the surname include:

- Edward Maufe (1882–1974), English architect and designer
- Herbert Maufe (1879–1946), English geologist
- Thomas Harold Broadbent Maufe (1898–1942), English recipient of the Victoria Cross

== See also ==
- Maude (name)
