= The Dragons Back =

Geographical ridge

The Dragons Back (80°23′S 28°33′W) is a mostly ice-free ridge rising to 1,315 metres (4,310 ft) in the western part of the La Grange Nunataks, Shackleton Range. It was photographed from the air by the U.S. Navy, 1967, and surveyed by the British Antarctic Survey, 1968–71. Descriptively named by the UK Antarctic Place-Names Committee in 1971, from the spikes on the ridge crest giving an allusion of a dragon.
