= Mount Etchells =

Mountain in Antarctica

Mount Etchells (80°17′S 28°20′W) is one of the La Grange Nunataks in the Shackleton Range of Antarctica, rising to about 900 metres (3,000 ft) to the west of Mount Beney. It was photographed from the air by the U.S. Navy in 1967 and surveyed by the British Antarctic Survey (BAS) between 1968–71. It was named by the UK Antarctic Place-Names Committee after William A. Etchells, a diesel mechanic and Projects Officer (engineering) with the BAS from 1962–88, who worked in the Shackleton Range between 1968–69.
