= Lewis Chain =

Group of nunataks in Antarctica

The Lewis Chain (80°23′S 26°50′W) is a chain of four rock nunataks on the west side of Gordon Glacier in the Shackleton Range of Antarctica. It was first mapped by the Commonwealth Trans-Antarctic Expedition (CTAE) in 1957, and was photographed by the U.S. Navy (trimetrogon aerial photography) in 1967. The chain was named by the UK Antarctic Place-Names Committee for Squadron Leader John H. Lewis, Royal Air Force (RAF), senior pilot of the RAF contingent of the CTAE, 1956–58.
