= Swinnerton Ledge =

Swinnerton Ledge (80°43′S 22°28′W) is a flat-topped ridge rising to about 1,500 m and marking the east end of the Read Mountains, Shackleton Range. Photographed from the air by the U.S. Navy, 1967. Surveyed by the British Antarctic Survey (BAS), 1968–71. In association with the names of geologists grouped in this area, named by the United Kingdom Antarctic Place-Names Committee (UK-APC) after Henry H. Swinnerton (1876–1966), British zoologist and paleontologist, Professor of Geology, University College, Nottingham (later the University of Nottingham), 1912–46; President, Geological Society, 1938–40.
