= Du Toit Nunataks =

Mountains in Antarctica

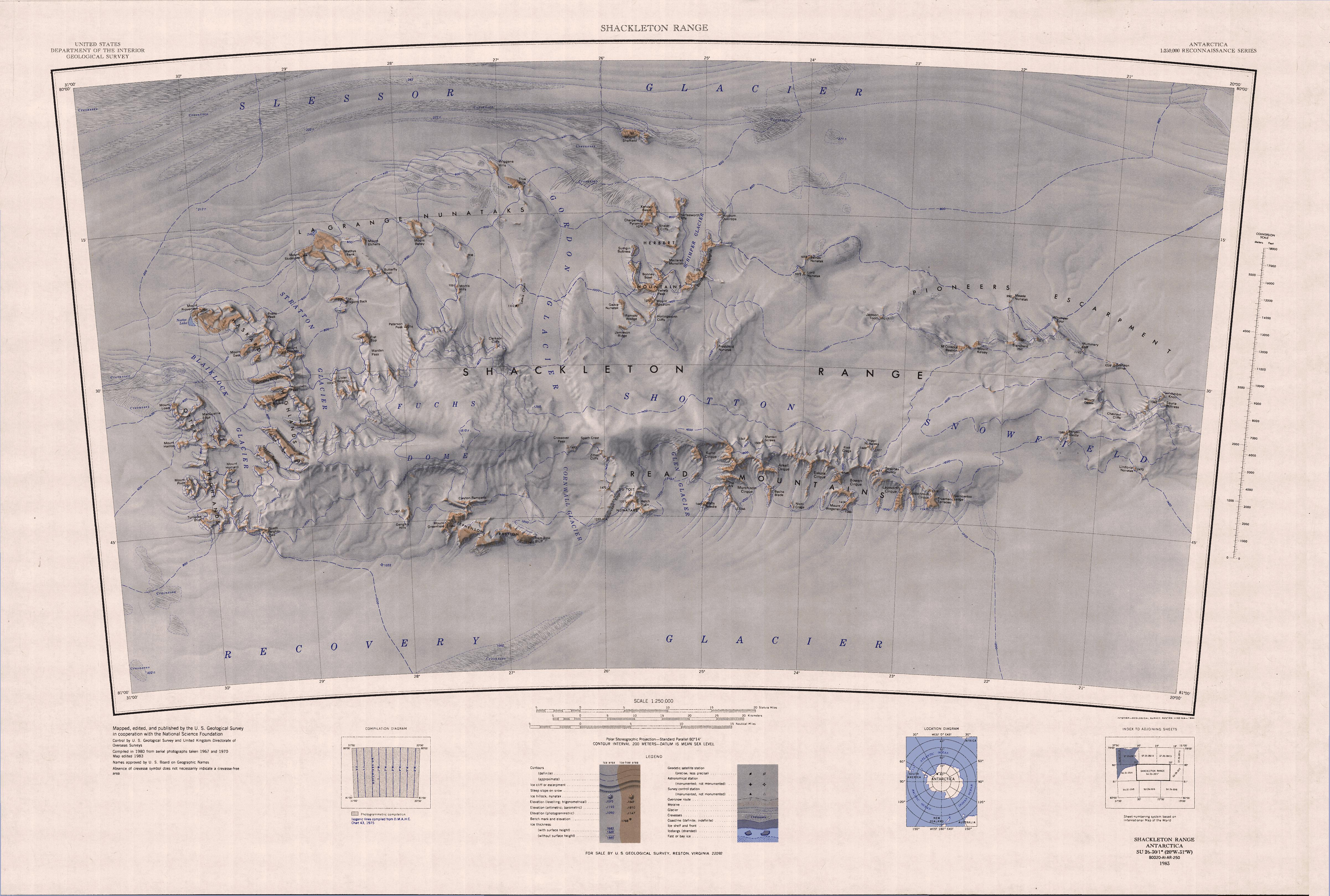
- Shackleton Range, Read Mountains in lower right

Highest point
- Elevation: 1,362 m (4,469 ft)

Geography
- Location within Antarctica
- Range coordinates: 80°43′S 25°50′W

The Du Toit Nunataks (80°43′S 25°50′W) are a group of nunataks between Cornwall Glacier and Glen Glacier, marking the western end of the Read Mountains in the Shackleton Range of Antarctica.

== Names ==
The Du Toit Nunataks were photographed from the air by the United States Navy, 1967, and surveyed by the British Antarctic Survey, 1968–71. In association with the names of geologists grouped in this area, they were named by the UK Antarctic Place-Names Committee after Alexander Logie du Toit, a South African geologist.

== Location ==
The Du Toit Nunataks lie to the south of the Shotton Snowfield to the west end of the Read Mountains. They lie between the Cornwall Glacier and the Glen Glacier, both of which flow south to join the Recovery Glacier, which flows westward past the south of the Du Toit Nunataks.

== Geology ==
The Du Toit Nunataks are in the Read Group of the southern belt of the Shackleton Mountains. They are mainly composed of partly migmatised quartzitic, basic, calcareous and pelitic rocks. In places they are interlayered with gneissic granites, and intruded by granites and basic rocks. Dating of the metagranites gives ages of around 1,760 and 1,600 million years. Rb–Sr and K-Ar mineral cooling ages are 1650–1550 million years.

== Features ==
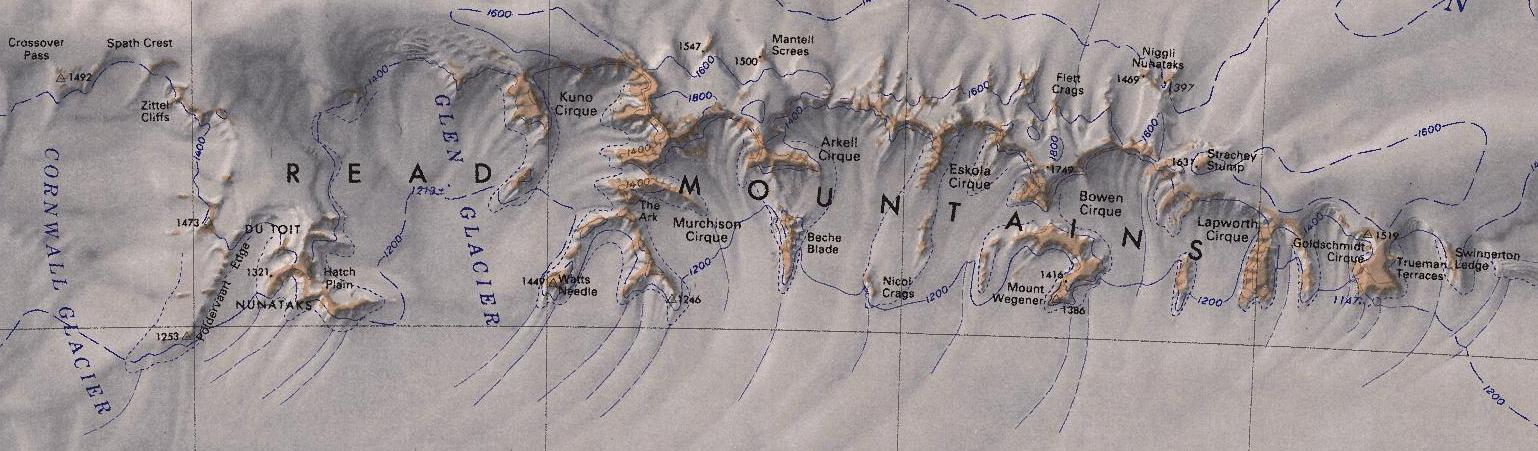
Read Mountains. Du Toit Nunataks to the west (left) between Cornwall Glacier and Glen Glacier.

Named geographical features on the 1983 United States Geological Survey map include:

=== Hatch Plain ===
80°44′S 25°36′W. A small debris-covered area with elevation about 1,350 metres (4,430 ft) on the east margin of Du Toit Nunataks, Read Mountains, in the Shackleton Range. Photographed from the air by the U.S. Navy, 1967, and surveyed by BAS, 1968–71. In association with the names of geologists grouped in this area, named by the UK-APC in 1971 after Frederick Henry Hatch (1864–1932), British consulting geologist; author of standard textbooks on igneous and sedimentary petrology.

=== Poldervaart Edge ===
80°44′S 25°57′W An east-facing escarpment rising to about 1,300 metres (4,300 ft) and trending northeast–southwest for 3.5 miles (5.6 km) in the Du Toil Nunataks, Read Mountains, Shackleton Range. Photographed from the air by the U.S. Navy, 1967, and surveyed by BAS, 1968-71. In association with the names of geologists grouped in this area, named by the UK-APC in 1971 after Professor Arie Poldervaart (1919–64), Dutch petrologist known for his research on basaltic rocks.

=== Spath Crest ===
80°39′S 26°12′W. A rocky summit rising to about 1,450 metres (4,760 ft) and marking the northwest end of Du Toit Nunataks, Read Mountains, in the Shackleton Range. Photographed from the air by the U.S. Navy, 1967, and surveyed by BAS, 1968-71. In association with the names of geologists grouped in the area, named by the UK-APC after Leonard Frank Spath (1882-1957), British paleontologist and stratigrapher whose study of ammonites made possible the correlation of Mesozoic rocks; paleontologist, British Museum (Natural History), 1912-57.

=== Zittel Cliffs ===
80°40′S 25°59′W. Cliffs rising to about 1,400 metres (4,600 ft) in the northest part of Du Toit Nunataks, Read Mountains, Shackleton Range. The feature was surveyed by the CTAE, 1957, photographed from the air by the U.S. Navy, 1967, and further surveyed by BAS, 1968-71. In association with the names of geologists grouped in this area, named by UK-APC in 1971 after Karl Alfred von Zittel (1839–1904), German paleontologist who specialized in the study of fossil sponges.

== Sources ==
- Alberts, Fred G., ed. (1995), Geographic Names of the Antarctic (PDF) (2 ed.), United States Board on Geographic Names This article incorporates public domain material from websites or documents of the United States Board on Geographic Names.
- Shackleton Range, United States Geological Survey, 1983 This article incorporates public domain material from websites or documents of the United States Geological Survey.
- Will, Thomas; Zeh, A.; Gerdes, Axel; Frimmel, Hartwig; Millar, I.L.; Schmädicke, E. (2009), "Palaeoproterozoic to Palaeozoic magmatic and metamorphic events in the Shackleton Range, East Antarctica: Constraints from zircon and monazite dating, and implications for the amalgamation of Gondwana", Precambrian Research, doi:10.1016/j.precamres.2009.03.008
