= Watts Needle =

Mountain in Antarctica

Watts Needle (80°44′S 24°59′W) is a needle-shaped peak (1,450 m) at the southwest end of the ridge east of Glen Glacier, in the Read Mountains, Shackleton Range. It was photographed from the air by the U.S. Navy in 1967 and was surveyed by the British Antarctic Survey (BAS) from 1968 to 1971. In association with the names of geologists grouped in this area, it was named by the United Kingdom Antarctic Place-Names Committee (UK-APC) in 1971 after William Whitehead Watts (1860–1947), a British geologist who worked particularly on the Precambrian rocks of the English midlands. Watts was also a professor of geology at the Imperial College in London from 1906 to 1930.
