= Morris Hills =

Hills in Antarctica

The Morris Hills (80°23′S 27°27′W) are a scattered group of hills 6 nautical miles (11 km) northeast of Petersen Peak, in the La Grange Nunataks of the north-central Shackleton Range, Antarctica. They were first mapped in 1957 by the Commonwealth Trans-Antarctic Expedition (CTAE), and photographed in 1967 by the U.S. Navy (trimetrogon aerial photography). The hills were named by the UK Antarctic Place-Names Committee for Leslie F. Morris, a member of the Royal Society International Geophysical Year Expedition at Brunt Ice Shelf, who in 1957 spent several weeks helping with the final preparations for the CTAE transpolar journey.
