= Gordon Glacier =

Glacier in Antarctica

- Location within Antarctica
- Location: Coats Land
- Coordinates: 80°17′S 26°09′W
- Length: 24 nmi (44 km; 28 mi)
- Thickness: unknown
- Terminus: Slessor Glacier
- Status: unknown

Gordon Glacier (80°17′S 26°09′W) is an Antarctic glacier of at least 24 nautical miles (44 km; 28 mi) in length flowing in a northerly direction beginning in the Crossover Pass, flowing through the Shackleton Range to finally meet the Slessor Glacier.

== Exploration ==
The glacier was first mapped in 1957 by the CTAE, and named after George Patrick Pirie-Gordon, 15th Laird of Buthlaw (died 4 April 2011), who was a member of the Committee of Management and treasurer of the CTAE between 1955 and 1958.

== Location ==
The Gordon Glacier is one of the larger of the glaciers in the Shackleton Range. It is essentially a long and wide snowfield. It does not show positive evidence of movement such as crevassing, but its upper reach has a group of ice falls and the middle section has wide and deep undulations. Its upper section is fed from Fuchs Dome to its west and Shotton Snowfield to its east. It flows between the La Grange Nunataks to the west and the Herbert Mountains to the east, entering Slessor Glacier between Wiggans Hills and Mount Sheffield.

The glacier originates near Crossover Pass and Spath Crest, which lie on the ice divide in the Shackleton Mountains, with Cornwall Glacier flowing south from this area while Gordon Glacier flows north. The valleys of the Gordon and Cornwall glaciers may reflect an underlying fault zone, and have been treated as a divide between the western and eastern portions of the Shackleton Range.

== See also ==
- List of glaciers in the Antarctic
- Glaciology

== Sources ==
- Alberts, Fred G., ed. (1995), Geographic Names of the Antarctic (PDF) (2 ed.), United States Board on Geographic Names This article incorporates public domain material from websites or documents of the United States Board on Geographic Names.
- Höfle, Hans-Christian; Buggisch, Werner (1993), "Glacial Geology and Petrography of Erratics in the Shackleton Range, Antarctica" (PDF), Polarforschung, vol. 63, no. 213, pp. 183–201
- Shackleton Range, United States Geological Survey, 1983 This article incorporates public domain material from websites or documents of the United States Geological Survey.
- Skidmore, Michael J.; Clarkson, Peter D. (1972), "Physiography and Glacial Geomorphology of the Shackleton Range" (PDF), Antarctic Survey Bulletin, no. 30
