= Nicol Crags =

Nicol Crags (80°44′S 24°5′W) is a rock crags rising to about 1,300 metres (4,300 ft) to the south of Arkell Cirque in the Read Mountains, Shackleton Range. Photographed from the air by the United States Navy, 1967, and surveyed by British Antarctic Survey (BAS), 1968–71. In association with the names of geologists grouped in this area, named by the UK Antarctic Place-Names Committee in 1971 after William Nicol (1770–1851), Scottish natural philosopher who devised the Nicol prism and the preparation of thin rock sections, thus contributing to the techniques of microscopy.
