= Cornwall Glacier =

Cornwall Glacier may refer to:

- Cornwall Glacier (Coats Land)
- Cornwall Glacier (Ross Dependency)
