= Beche Blade =

Beche Blade (80°43′S 24°19′W) is a sharp-crested ridge rising to 1,600 metres (5,200 ft) between Murchison Cirque and Arkell Cirque on the south side of the Read Mountains, Shackleton Range. It was photographed from the air by the U.S. Navy, 1967, and surveyed by the British Antarctic Survey, 1968–71. In association with the names of geologists grouped in this area, it was named in 1971 by the UK Antarctic Place-Names Committee after Sir Henry Thomas de la Beche, English geologist, first Director-General of the Geological Survey of Great Britain (later the Institute of Geological Sciences), 1835–55.
