= Trueman Terraces =

Trueman Terraces (80°43′S 22°41′W) are ice-free terraces rising to 1,520 m on the east side of Goldschmidt Cirque, near the east end of Read Mountains, Shackleton Range. Photographed from the air by the U.S. Navy, 1967, and surveyed by British Antarctic Survey (BAS), 1968–71. In association with the names of geologists grouped in this area, named by the United Kingdom Antarctic Place-Names Committee (UK-APC) after Sir Arthur E. Trueman (1895–1956), British geologist, who worked on the coal measures and their correlation by marine bands, and on the introduction of statistical methods into paleontology; Professor of Geology, Glasgow University, 1937–46; President, Geological Society of London, 1945–47.
