= Geological Society of South Africa =

South African learned society for geology

The Geological Society of South Africa (GSSA) is a learned society for geological science that was founded in 1895, making it one of the oldest such societies in Africa. The society was founded by the South African geologist, Dr David Draper. The society annually awards the Draper Memorial Medal in Draper's honour to recognise achievement in geology. They also award the Des Pretorius Memorial Award (in honour of Desmond Pretorius) to recognise exceptional work on economic geology in Africa.

The GSSA publishes the peer-reviewed scientific journal, the South African Journal of Geology, The GSSA collaborates internationally with other professional organizations such as the European Federation of Geologists (EFG).

== Presidents of the Geological Society of South Africa ==
The first president of the geological society was elected in 1895, and served a seven year term. Thereafter, the role was filled annually through the twentieth century.

- 1895-1902 Hugh Exton
- 1903 Gustaaf Molengraaf
- 1904 A R Sawyer
- 1905 F H Hatch
- 1906 G S Corstophine
- 1907 E Jorissen
- 1908 H Kynaston
- 1909 J McLelland Henderson
- 1910 Robert Burns Young
- 1911 E T Mellor
- 1912 H S Harger
- 1913 Arthur Lewis Hall
- 1914 D P McDonald
- 1915 Arthur William Rogers
- 1916 P A Wagner
- 1917 Alexander du Toit
- 1918 Herbert Maufe
- 1919 J Jervis Garrard
- 1920 T N Leslie
- 1921 Samuel Shand
- 1922 C J Gray
- 1923 J G Lawn
- 1924 W G Holford
- 1925 Sidney Haughton
- 1926 R B Young
- 1927 Alexander du Toit
- 1928 L J Krige
- 1929 L Reinecke
- 1930 H Pirow
- 1931 G A Watermeyer
- 1932 L Nel
- 1933 F E Keep
- 1934 R S G Stokes
- 1935 G Carleton Jones
- 1936 T W Gevers
- 2022/23 Tania Marshall
- 2023/4 Steve McCourt
- 2025-2027 Noleen Pauls

== Draper Memorial Medal ==
The senior medal of the society is the Draper Memorial Medal, awarded annually since 1932 in honour of David Draper. The medal is presented for 'a significant contribution to the discipline of geology and to the furtherance of South African geology'. Selected recipients of the Draper Memorial Medal include:

- 1932 Arthur Lewis Hall
- 1933 Alexander du Toit
- 1934 Herbert Maufe
- 1937 Samuel James Shand
- 1940 Harold Harger
- 1943 Louis Taylor Nel
- 1945 Frank Dixey
- 1948 Hans Merensky
- 1958 Joseph Austin Bancroft
- 1961 Sidney H. Haughton
- 1978 Desmond Pretorius
- 1985 Morris James Viljoen and Richard Viljoen
- 2014 Steven Richardson
- 2024 Lewis Ashwal
