= Hisashi Kuno =

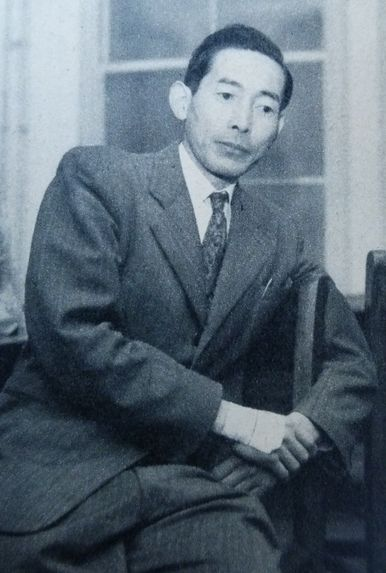
- Born: 7 January 1910; Tokyo
- Died: 6 August 1969 (aged 59); Tokyo
- Education: University of Tokyo
- Known for: "Volcanos and volcanic rocks" (1954), genesis of basaltic magmas
- Awards: Japan Academy Prize (1954)
- Scientific career
- Fields: Petrology, volcanology

Hisashi Kuno (久野 久, Kuno Hisashi; 7 January 1910 – 6 August 1969) was professor at the Institute of Geology, University of Tokyo. He was first son of Kamenosuke Kuno (a painter of the Japanese classical school) and Tome Kuno.

== Life ==
There was a field excursion after the 1930 North Izu earthquake southwest of Tokyo. This resulted that his life work (the rest 40 years) was the petrology of the Izu-Hakone region, the basaltic magmas and the crystallization of pyroxenes. He graduated at University of Tokyo (former Tokyo Imperial University) in 1932 and became assistant professor in 1939. He was drafted into the army during World War II in July 1941. He was stationed in the Manchuria and he could study the geology and mineralogy of pegmatites and several basalt plateaus there. He received his doctor of science in 1948. He visited the United States in 1951–52 and worked with professor Harry H. Hess at Princeton University. He was appointed professor of the Institute of Geology in 1955.

When the Wadati–Benioff zone (earthquake foci in the mantle) is less than 200 km deep, tholeiitic basalt magmas are produced (Izu Ōshima, Mount Hakone for instance). At intermediate depths high-alumina basalt magmas are formed (Mount Fuji, Southern Yatsugatake Volcanic Group, Mount Ontake, for instance) and at depths greater than 250 km alkali olivine basalt ones (Oki-Dōgo, for instance). Hisashi Kuno contributed to unfold this causal correlation.

He received the Japan Academy Award (1954). He was president of the International Association of Volcanology and Chemistry of the Earth's Interior (IAVCEI) during the period 1963–1967, and vice-president of the International Union of Geodesy and Geophysics and for the International Union of Geological Sciences at the time of his death. The Kuno Cirque, Read Mountains, Shackleton Range, Antarctica was named in his honour. Kuno Peak in Mount Edziza Provincial Park of British Columbia, Canada, was named after Hisashi Kuno.

== Selected publications ==
- Kuno, H. (1936). "Petrological notes on some pyroxene-andesites from Hakone volcano, with special reference to some types with pigeonite phenocrysts". Science Council of Japan.
- Kuno, H. (1950). "Geology of Hakone volcano and adjacent areas. Part I". J. Faculty of Sciences Univ. Tokyo. Sec. 2, 7, 257–279.
- Kuno, H. (1951). "Geology of Hakone volcano and adjacent areas. Part II". J. Faculty of Sciences Univ. Tokyo. Sec. 2, 7, 351–402.
- Hisashi Kuno (1954). "Volcanos and volcanic rocks: structure and character of the volcano". Iwanami series. Astronomy and geology, Iwanami Books, pp. 255.
- Kuno, H., Yamasaki, K., Iida, C., & Nagashima, K. (1957). "Differentiation of Hawaiian magmas". Japanese Journal of Geology and Geography, 28, 179–218.
- Kuno, H. (1960). "High-alumina basalt". Journal of petrology, 1(1), 121–145.
- Kuno, H. (1962). "Catalogue of the active volcanoes of the world including solfatara fields. 11. Catalogue of the active volcanoes and solfatara fields of Japan, Taiwan and Marianas". Rome: International Association of Volcanology.
- Kuno, H. (1968). "Origin of andesite and its bearing on the island arc structure". Bulletin Volcanologique, 32(1), 141–176.
- Kuno, H. (1968). "Differentiation of basaltic magmas". p. 623-688. In H. Hess and Arie Poldervaart, eds. (1967–68) "Basalts. The Poldervaart Treatise on Rocks of Basaltic Composition". Vol. 1, pp. 495 and vol. 2, pp. 400. New York: Interscience (Wiley).
- Kuno, H. (1971). "Geologic map of Hakone volcano and the adjacent areas". Tokyo: University of Tokyo?
