= South African Journal of Geology =

- Discipline: Geology, Earth science
- Language: English

Publication details
- Former name(s): Transactions of the Geological Society of South Africa
- History: 1896–present
- Publisher: Geological Society of South Africa (South Africa)
- Frequency: Quarterly
- Open access: Hybrid

Standard abbreviations
- ISO 4: S. Afr. J. Geol.

Indexing
- CODEN: SAJGET
- ISSN: 1012-0750 (print); 1996-8590 (web)
- LCCN: sn87030226
- OCLC no.: 918565490

Links
- Journal homepage; Online access; Online archive

The South African Journal of Geology is a quarterly peer-reviewed scientific journal published by the Geological Society of South Africa that was established in March 1896 as the Transactions of the Geological Society of South Africa, obtaining its current title in 1987. Incorporated into the volumes up to and including volume 73 (1970) were the Proceedings of the Geological Society of South Africa. The journal publishes scientific papers, notes, stratigraphic descriptions, and discussions in the broadly defined fields of geoscience that are related directly or indirectly to the geology of Africa. Contributions relevant to former supercontinents such as Gondwana and Pangaea are also published as are topical studies on any geology-related discipline. The journal is abstracted and indexed in the Science Citation Index, Current Contents, GeoRef, Scopus, GEOBASE, and Academic Search.
