= Thomas Harold Broadbent Maufe =

- Born: 6 May 1898; Ilkley, West Yorkshire
- Died: 28 March 1942 (aged 43); Ilkley
- Burial place: Ilkley Cemetery
- Military career
- Allegiance: United Kingdom
- Branch: British Army
- Rank: Major
- Units: Royal Artillery; Home Guard
- Conflicts: World War I: Western Front; World War II: Home Front †
- Awards: Victoria Cross

Thomas Harold Broadbent Maufe VC (6 May 1898 – 28 March 1942) was an English recipient of the Victoria Cross, the highest and most prestigious award for gallantry in the face of the enemy that can be awarded to British and Commonwealth forces. He was educated at Uppingham School.

== VC details ==
He was 19 years old, and a second lieutenant in the 124th Siege Battery, Royal Garrison Artillery during the First World War when the following deed took place for which he was awarded the VC.

On 4 June 1917 at Feuchy, France, Second Lieutenant Maufe, on his own initiative and under intense artillery fire repaired, unaided, the telephone wire between the forward and rear positions, thereby enabling his battery to open fire on the enemy. He also saved what could have been a disastrous occurrence by extinguishing a fire in an advanced ammunition dump caused by a heavy explosion, regardless of the risk he ran from the effects of gas shells in the dump.

== Further information ==
By the end of the war he had achieved the rank of major, one of the youngest to hold that rank. After the war Maufe completed his interrupted education at Clare College, Cambridge and the Royal School of Mines where he was a member of The Chaps Club.

Maufe served in the Home Guard as a volunteer during World War II in 28th West Riding (Otley) Bn. He was killed in an accident with a misfiring trench mortar during training at the age of 43 on 28 March 1942 near Ilkley. He is buried in Ilkley Cemetery.

Maufe's name is listed on a war memorial on the gates of his former prep school, Nevill Holt, near the village of Medbourne, Leicestershire, along with other casualties of the world wars.

== Family ==
He was the son of Frederick Broadbent and Helen Mann Maufe, of Warlbeck, Ilkley, West Yorkshire. He married Mary Gwendolen Carr.

The family name was originally Muff but was changed to Maufe by deed poll in 1909. The family part-owned the Bradford department store Brown Muff & Co. In response to their rising fortunes they left Bradford and changed their name to Maufe, thereby inspiring the local ditty: "In Bradford 'tis good enoof/To be known as Mrs Muff/But in Ilkley by the river Wharfe/'Tis better to be known as Mrs Maufe!"

He was a cousin of the geologist Herbert Maufe, and of the architect Edward Maufe.

== Bibliography ==
- Gliddon, Gerald (2012) [1998]. Arras and Messines 1917. VCs of the First World War. The History Press. ISBN 978-0-7524-6604-0.
