= Holmes Summit =

Summit in Antarctica

Coordinates: 80°40′S 24°40′W

- Location within Antarctica

Highest point
- Elevation: 1,875 m (6,152 ft)

Geography
- Location: Antarctica
- Parent range: Read Mountains, Shackleton Range

Holmes Summit is a peak rising to 1,875 metres (6,150 ft), the highest elevation in the Read Mountains of the Shackleton Range in Antarctica. It was photographed from the air by the U.S. Navy in 1967 and was surveyed by the British Antarctic Survey in the period 1968–71. In association with the names of geologists grouped in this area, it was named by the UK Antarctic Place-Names Committee in 1971 after Professor Arthur Holmes, after whom the Holmes Hills in Palmer Land were also named.
