= Shandite =

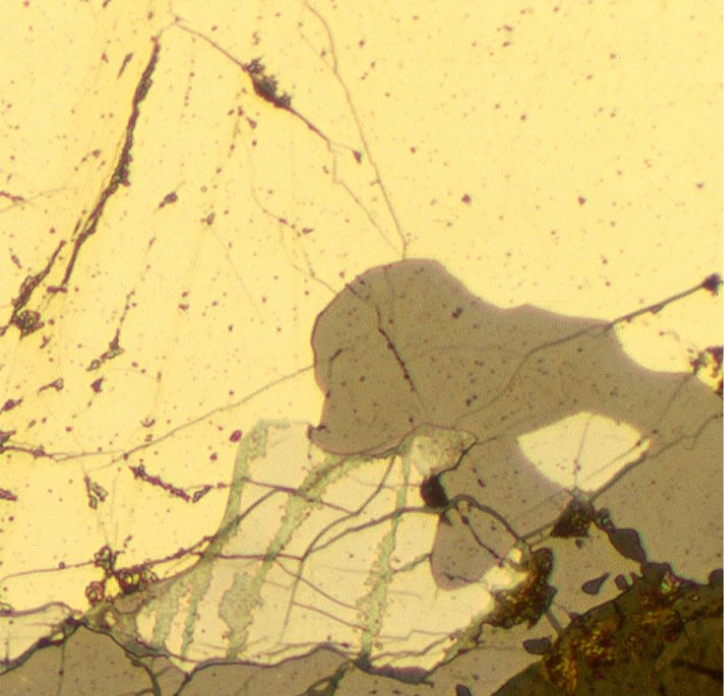

General
- Category: Sulfide mineral
- Formula: Ni_{3}Pb_{2}S_{2}
- IMA symbol: Snd
- Strunz classification: 2.BE.15
- Crystal system: Trigonal
- Crystal class: Hexagonal scalenohedral (3̅m); H-M symbol (3̅ 2/m)
- Space group: R3̅m
- Unit cell: a = 5.59 Å, c = 13.57 Å; Z = 3

Identification
- Formula mass: 654.60 g/mol
- Color: Brass yellow, cream-white in polished section
- Crystal habit: Generally found as an inclusion
- Cleavage: {1011} Perfect
- Mohs scale hardness: 4
- Luster: Metallic
- Diaphaneity: Opaque
- Specific gravity: 8.72
- Birefringence: Strong, dark blue-gray
- Pleochroism: Distinct

Shandite is a sulfide mineral with chemical formula: Ni_{3}Pb_{2}S_{2}. It was discovered in 1948 by the German mineralogist Paul Raumdohr who named it named after Scottish petrologist, Samuel James Shand (1882–1957). Ramdohr characterized shandite by its metallic luster and a brass-yellow color. It has a specific gravity of 8.92, and a Mohs hardness value of 4. Shandite is commonly found as an inclusion in other minerals such as Heazelwoodite Ni_{3}S_{2} or serpentine.

Its crystal system is trigonal hexagonal scalenohedral with symbol 3̅2/m. It belongs to the space group R3̅m. Shandite is an anisotropic mineral, which means it has different properties when being viewed from different directions. In cross-polarized light it appears as gray blue or yellow-brown colors. It also has very distinct relief, which means it stands out against its mounting medium and can be easily seen. It has an index of refraction of 1.54, which is the measure of the speed of light through the substance. In plane polarized light, shandite has a creamy white color and distinct pleochroism, which is the property that makes it appear to be different colors at different angles. It has strong birefringence, which is the decomposition of light into two rays, and appears dark blue and gray.

In subsequent decades several compounds with shandite type structure were synthesized by several chemists. The group of compounds M_{3}A_{2}Ch_{2} with shandite type crystal structures was subsequently called "shandites". They include Co_{3}Sn_{2}S_{2} = Sn_{2}Co_{3}S_{2} = Co_{3/2}SnS that became famous in recent years as layered half metal ferromagnet and topological semi metal including kagome layers of cobalt atoms.
