= Wiggans Hills =

Hill range in Antarctica

Wiggans Hills (80°11′S 27°3′W) are a range of exposed rock hills in Antarctica, 2 nautical miles (3.7 km) long, rising to about 700 m on the west side of the terminus of Gordon Glacier and forming the northernmost feature of La Grange Nunataks, Shackleton Range. Photographed from the air by the U.S. Navy, 1967, and surveyed by British Antarctic Survey (BAS), 1968–71. Named by the United Kingdom Antarctic Place-Names Committee (UK-APC) in 1971 for Thomas H. Wiggans, BAS general assistant at Halley Station, 1968–70, who worked in the area during two seasons.
