= Geological Commission of the Cape of Good Hope =

The Geological Commission of the Cape of Good Hope was a South African geological survey that published a series of maps and literature of the geology and hydrogeology of South Africa, particularly the Western Cape and surrounding areas during its existence from 1896 to 1911.

The Geological Commission was established in November 1895 with John X. Merriman as commissioner and George Corstorphine as geologist, and operated until 1911 when it was amalgamated with the Geological Survey of the Union of South Africa. A.W. Rogers was appointed to the Survey on 11 January 1896. Staff details may be seen in Public Service Lists of the Cape Colony. All the publications in this series are out of print.

Alexander du Toit did extensive mapping of the Karoo System geology and other western areas of South Africa. Later du Toit published literature in support of Alfred Wegener's theory of continental drift, supported by the detailed maps he and others had created for the survey of this region and from later mapping in southern South America.

== Annual reports ==
The annual reports were issued in two forms: as an ordinary Blue Book presented to both Houses of Parliament, printed on common paper and in octavo size; and a limited number printed on thick paper, in small quarto size. The pagination of the First Report is different in the two editions, the type having been entirely re-set, but the contents are identical. In the reports following the First, the pagination of the two editions is the same, and one setting of type has served for both. – Schwarz, E.H.L., Index to the Annual Reports. The 8vo page numbers are inserted here in italics. The 'common paper' 8vo. editions are bound in Annexures to the Votes & Proceedings of Parliament; copies in the Archives of the Council for Geoscience are the small quarto editions.

== Geologic maps ==
The commission issued geological maps with a scale of 1:238,000 (1,600 Cape Roods = 1 inch). They were printed by van de Sandt Villiers & Co. Cape Town. The sheets are numbered, but the map names shown below were not printed on earlier maps.

- I. Cape Town–Robertson. 1906. A.W. Rogers, E.H.L. Schwarz & A.L. du Toit.
- II. Swellendam-Riversdale. 1907. A.W. Rogers, E.H.L. Schwarz.
- IV. Malmesbury-Ceres. 1907. A.W. Rogers, E.H.L. Schwarz & A.L. du Toit.
- XI. Clanwilliam. 1911. A.W. Rogers, E.H.L. Schwarz & A.L. du Toit.
- XIII. Beaufort West-Fraserburg. 1911. A.W. Rogers, E.H.L. Schwarz.
- XIX. Nieuwerust. 1912. A.W. Rogers.
- XXVI. Barkly East. 1912. A.L. du Toit.
- XXXII. Van Wyks Vlei. 1910. A.W. Rogers, & A.L. du Toit.
- XXXIII. Britstown. 1909. A.L. du Toit.
- XL. Marydale. 1910. A.W. Rogers & A.L. du Toit.
- XLI. Griquatown. 1909. A.W. Rogers & A.L. du Toit.
- XLII. Kimberley. 1908. A.L. du Toit.
- XLV. Postmasburg. 1907. A.W. Rogers.
- XLVI. Barkly West. 1908. A.L. du Toit.
- XLIX. Kuruman. 1908. A.W. Rogers.
- L. Vryburg. 1908. A.W. Rogers & A.L. du Toit.
- LII. Mafeking. 1908. A.L. du Toit.
