= Glen Glacier =

Glacier in Coats Land, Antarctica

- Location within Antarctica
- Location: Coats Land
- Coordinates: 80°44′S 25°16′W
- Length: 7 nmi (13 km; 8 mi)
- Thickness: unknown
- Terminus: Shackleton Range
- Status: unknown

Glen Glacier (80°44′S 25°16′W) is a glacier at least 7 nautical miles (13 km) long, flowing south in the Shackleton Range of Antarctica to join Recovery Glacier to the west of the Read Mountains.

== Exploration ==
The Glan Glacier was first mapped in 1957 by the Commonwealth Trans-Antarctic Expedition (CTAE) and named for Alexander Richard "Sandy" Glen, a member of the Committee of Management of the CTAE, 1955–58.

== Location ==
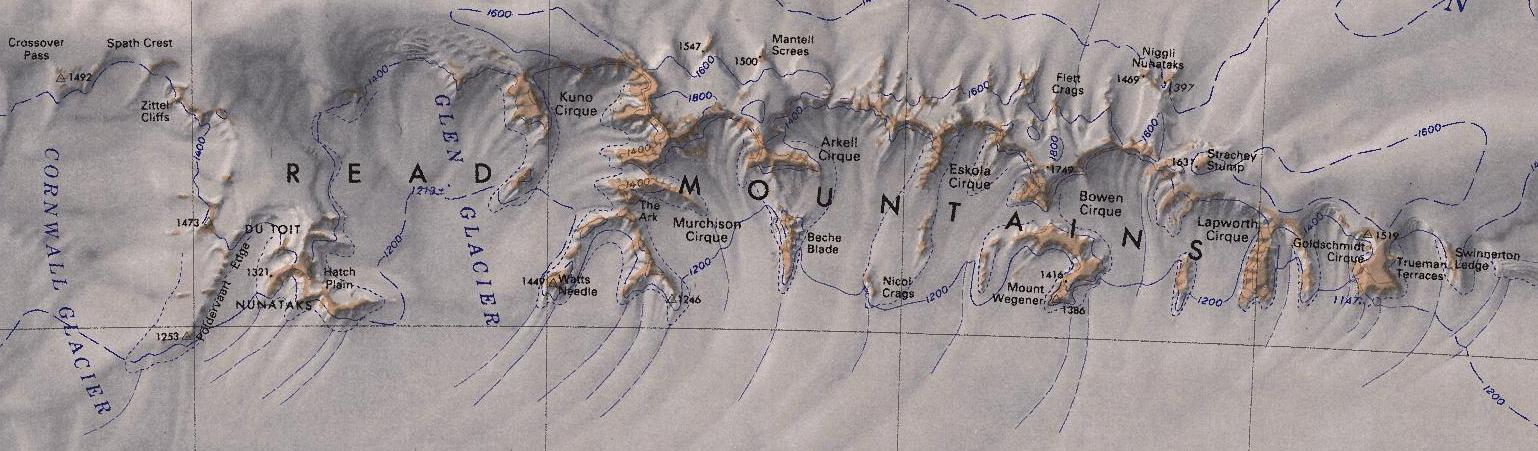
Read Mountains. Glen Glacier towards the west

The glacier slopes south through the Read Mountains from the Shotton Snowfield to join the Recovery Glacier. It is flanked by the Kuno Cirque and the Hatch Plain, and enters the Recovery Glacier between the Du Toit Nunataks and Watts Needle. Glen Glacier is relatively short and immature, and appears to be static. The valleys on either side probably do not contribute ice.

== See also ==
- List of glaciers in the Antarctic
- Glaciology

== Sources ==
- Alberts, Fred G., ed. (1995), Geographic Names of the Antarctic (PDF) (2 ed.), United States Board on Geographic Names This article incorporates public domain material from websites or documents of the United States Board on Geographic Names.
- Höfle, Hans-Christian; Buggisch, Werner (1993), "Glacial Geology and Petrography of Erratics in the Shackleton Range, Antarctica" (PDF), Polarforschung, vol. 63, no. 213, pp. 183–201
- Shackleton Range, United States Geological Survey, 1983 This article incorporates public domain material from websites or documents of the United States Geological Survey.
- Skidmore, Michael J.; Clarkson, Peter D. (1972), "Physiography and Glacial Geomorphology of the Shackleton Range" (PDF), Antarctic Survey Bulletin, no. 30
