= Arie Poldervaart =

Professor of petrology, Columbia University

- Born: July 6, 1918
- Died: October 28, 1964 (aged 46)
- Education: University of Cape Town
- Scientific career
- Fields: Petrology
- Workplaces: Columbia University

Arie Poldervaart (6 July 1918 in Bandung, Indonesia – 28 October 1964 in Manhattan) was a Dutch petrologist and leading expert on igneous and metamorphic rocks. He was a Guggenheim Fellow for the academic year 1959–1960.

== Biography ==
=== Education and early career ===
Arie Poldervaart grew up in Java, which was then part of the Dutch East Indies. In September 1934 he went to the Netherlands to complete his schooling. For the two academic years 1935–1936 and 1936–1937 he studied applied and industrial chemistry at Technische Hoogeschool Delft. In the summer of 1937 he rejoined his parents in Bandung. After a few months in Java working as an apprentice in the Dutch government geological survey, he matriculated in January 1938 at the University of Cape Town to study chemistry and geology. After receiving his M.S. in 1940, he became a doctoral candidate under the supervision of Frederick Walker (1898–1968), F.R.S.E. Starting in 1939, they did field work together on the Karoo dolerites. Poldervaart received his Ph.D. in 1942. In December 1942 he married Gertrude Middleton.

In 1942 the Japanese invaded Java and Poldervaart's parents were imprisoned. His mother died in 1944. After teaching science at Rondebosch's Diocesan College, he left South Africa in December 1944 to go to Australia and join the Netherlands East Indies Forces. After leaving military service in 1946, he returned to South Africa and continued his research with Walker on the Karoo dolerites. In 1949 Walker and Poldervaart published an important monograph on their research. Also in 1949 Poldervaart and von Bäckstrom published an article on their field work.

Poldervaart won the gold medal of the Geological Society of South Africa. Harry H. Hess recommended him as Columbia University's professor of petrology in succession to Samuel James Shand.

=== Relocation to the United States ===
In 1951 Poldervaart immigrated with his family to the United States to become an associate professor at Columbia University. Shortly after moving to the United States in 1951, he became interested in metabasaltic rocks as a means of interpreting the polymetamorphic history of the Blue Ridge Province, North Carolina. The following year he initiated an ambitious and far-reaching program of research in the metamorphic terrain of the Beartooth Mountains in southern Montana and northern Wyoming.

Crust of the Earth, a Symposium (1955), edited by Poldervaart, became one of the Geological Society of American's best-selling books. In 1957 he was appointed a full professor, retaining the professorship until his death in 1964. In September 1958 Harry H. Hess recommended him for a Guggenheim Fellowship, which was awarded in 1959.

=== Later research and death ===
Considered a leading authority on the origin of rocks, Dr. Poldevaart did field research in Europe, Africa, the East Indies, Australia, and many parts of North. America. His scientific papers dealt with some of the world's most ancient rocks and contributed much to the knowledge of the composition of igneous and metamorphic rocks.

When he died of a heart ailment, Poldervaart had partially completed a comprehensive textbook on igneous and metamorphic petrology involving basalts. The work, completed and edited by Harry H. Hess, was published in 2 volumes as Basalts: The Poldervaart Treatise on Rocks of Basaltic Composition (volume 1 in 1967 and volume 2 in 1968) by John Wiley & Sons.

Upon his death in 1964 Poldervaart was survived by his widow, a son, and two daughters, as well as his father and a sister.

== Selected publications ==
- Poldervaart, A.; Hess, H. H. (1951). "Pyroxenes in the Crystallization of Basaltic Magma". The Journal of Geology. 59 (5): 472–489. Bibcode:1951JG.....59..472P. doi:10.1086/625891. S2CID 128692354.
- Poldervaart, Arie (1953). "Metamorphism of Basaltic Rocks: A Review". Geological Society of America Bulletin. 64 (3): 259–274. Bibcode:1953GSAB...64..259P. doi:10.1130/0016-7606(1953)64[259:MOBRAR]2.0.CO;2.
- Gilkey, Arthur K.; Poldervaart, Arie (February 1954). "On clouded plagioclase". American Mineralogist. 39 (1–2): 75–91.
- Poldervaart, Arie (1955). "Chemistry of the Earth's Crust". Crust of the Earth: A Symposium. Geological Society of America. pp. 119–144. ISBN 9780813720623.
- Poldervaart, A. (1955). "Zircons in rocks; Part 1, Sedimentary rocks; Part 2, Igneous rocks". American Journal of Science. 253 (8): 433–461. Bibcode:1955AmJS..253..433P. doi:10.2475/ajs.253.8.433.
- Poldervaart, A. (1956). "Zircon in rocks; 2, Igneous rocks". American Journal of Science. 254 (9): 521–554. Bibcode:1956AmJS..254..521P. doi:10.2475/ajs.254.9.521.
- Larsen, Leonard H.; Poldervaart, Arie (1957). "Measurement and distribution of zircons in some granitic rocks of magmatic origin". Mineralogical Magazine and Journal of the Mineralogical Society. 31 (238): 544–564. Bibcode:1957MinM...31..544L. doi:10.1180/minmag.1957.031.238.03.
- Sukheswala, Ratan N.; Poldervaart, Arie (1958). "Deccan Basalts of the Bombay Area, India". Geological Society of America Bulletin. 69 (12): 1473. Bibcode:1958GSAB...69.1473S. doi:10.1130/0016-7606(1958)69[1473:DBOTBA]2.0.CO;2.
