= Frank Dixey =

British hydrologist and geologist (1892–1982)

Sir Frank Dixey KCMG FRS
- Born: 7 April 1892; Bristol, England
- Died: 1 November 1982 (aged 90)
- Education: University College, Cardiff
- Awards: Murchison Medal (1953); OBE (1929); CMG (1949); KCMG (1972)
- Scientific career
- Fields: Hydrology and geology.

Frank Dixey KCMG FRS was a British hydrologist and geologist, who spent his career working in the colonial geological surveys. He was elected to the Royal Society in 1958, and knighted in 1972.

== Life and works ==
Dixey was born in Bristol, the third child of George Dixey and Mary (née Nippress). When he was two years old, the family moved to Barry, Glamorgan. He attended Clive Road school, Barry Island until 1902, High Street Boys’ school until 1905 and Barry Grammar School until 1910. In 1910, Dixey went to University College, Cardiff to study physics, chemistry and mathematics. He graduated in 1914 with first class honours in geology.

He remained in Cardiff, in the post of Assistant Lecturer, to work with Franklin Sibly on the Carboniferous limestones. He was awarded an MSc in 1916. In 1915, joined the Royal Engineers and served in France and Belgium, and ended up as a gunner with the Royal Garrison Artillery. In May 1918, Dixey was transferred to Sierra Leone, to conduct a geological survey. By 1922, he had completed three long tours overseas, and this work had earned him the DSc from the University of Wales. In late 1921, Dixey was appointed government geologist in Malawi, then called the Nyasaland protectorate. His geological mapping extended to the dinosaur beds of Lake Nyasa, the southern extension of the rift valley through Malawi and the carbonatites at Chilwa; and he conducted the geological groundwork for the Zambesi bridge, at that time the longest bridge in Africa. In 1928, Dixey was appointed director of the Malawi survey, and turned his attention to groundwater resources. He wrote a ‘handbook of practical water supply’, which was influential in changing practices around water supply in several other countries in Africa. In 1939, he extended his work to present day Zambia, and later to Kenya, Tanzania, Sudan and Eritrea. In 1944, Dixey was appointed director of the geological survey of Nigeria, and in 1947 was appointed geological adviser to the secretary of state for the colonies, and as director of colonial geological surveys. Dixey retired in 1959, but continued to work for United Nations and Unesco, advising on mineral and water resources. In 1965, he was one of three founding editors of the Journal of Hydrology, a role he retained until 1977.

In 2009, Dixey was honoured with a Blue Plaque in Prince's street, Barry. Dixey's archives are held at the British Geological Survey.

== Awards ==
Dixey was awarded the OBE in 1929, for his services as the director of the geological survey of Malawi. In 1949, he was appointed Commander of the Order of St Michael and St George, and in 1972 was appointed Knight Commander, KCMG. He was awarded the Draper Memorial Medal of the Geological Society of South Africa in 1945, and the Murchison Medal of the Geological Society of London in 1953. He was elected FRS in 1958.

== Family ==
Dixey married Henrietta Frederika Alexandra Helen Golding on 23 June 1919. Golding was a lecturer in botany at University College, Cardiff, but she gave up her post to join Dixey on his overseas tours. She died in March 1961. They had a daughter, Ann Helen, born in 1929, who died in 1970. In 1962, Dixey married Cicely Mary Hepworth. Lady Dixey died in August 2001.
