= Gustaaf Adolf Frederik Molengraaff =

Dutch geologist, biologist and explorer

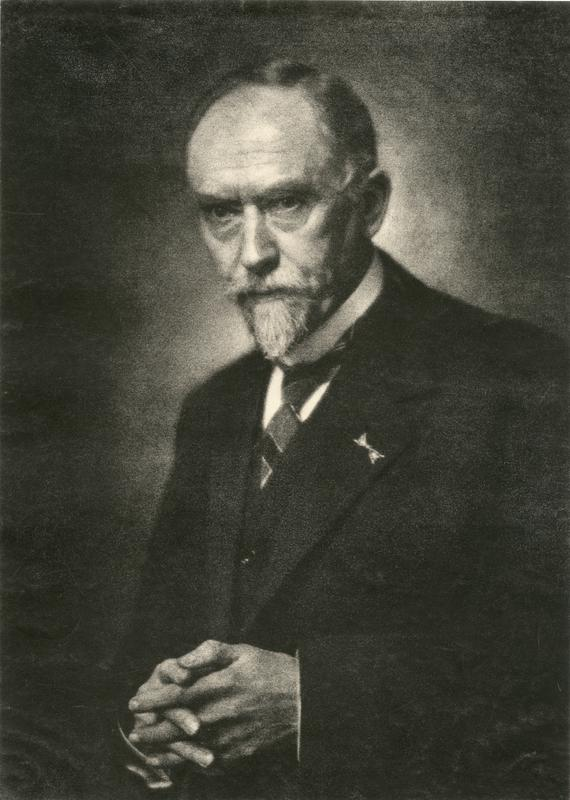
- Gustaaf Molengraaff
- Born: 27 February 1860; Nijmegen, Netherlands
- Died: 26 March 1942 (aged 82)
- Education: Leiden University (MSc); Utrecht University (PhD)

Gustaaf Adolf Frederik Molengraaff (27 February 1860 – 26 March 1942) was a Dutch geologist, biologist and explorer. He became an authority on the geology of South Africa and the Dutch East Indies.

== Life ==
Gustaaf Molengraaff was born on 27 February 1860, in Nijmegen, Netherlands, the son of Wilhelmina (née Abeleven) and Gerard Molengraaf. After attending his secondary education at the Gymnasium in Nijmegen, he went to Leiden University in 1877 where he studied mathematics and physics, but he graduated in botany and geology. He then went to the Utrecht University where he pursued his doctoral studies. As a student he made his first journey overseas when he joined the 1884–1885 expedition to the Dutch Antilles led by Willem Frederik Reinier Suringar and Karl Martin. He obtained a PhD degree in 1886 with a thesis on the geology of Sint Eustatius. He then spent a year studying crystallography under Karl Alfred von Zittel at the Ludwig-Maximilians-Universität München, during which he took part in expeditions to study the geology of the Alps nearby. He also specialized in petrography.

In 1888 Molengraaff took a job as a teacher at the University of Amsterdam. Before his assignment courses in geology were given by the chemist Jacobus Henricus van 't Hoff. During his assignment in Amsterdam, Molengraaff travelled to South Africa to study gold deposits (1891) and to Borneo (1894) where he explored large parts of the inland. Teaching at Amsterdam was not to his liking, because there were too little materials and students available.

In 1897 Molengraaff became "state geologist" of the Transvaal Republic. His task was to start the geological survey of the Transvaal. While mapping the Transvaal he discovered the Bushveld complex. In 1900, he got involved in the Second Boer War and had to return to the Netherlands. This gave him time to write a report on the geology of the Transvaal, and travel to Celebes, where he (again) studied gold deposits.

Due to his reputation as a geologist he could return to South Africa in 1901 to work as a geological consultant. One of his assignments was to describe the newly found Cullinan diamond for the Central Bank of South Africa. Meanwhile, the Boer War still had his attention. One of his ideas was to give each soldier a small tin identity card, which later became practice in armies around the world.

In 1906, he became professor at Delft University of Technology and this time he got enough resources and students to make his work successful. The same year he became member of the Royal Netherlands Academy of Arts and Sciences. From 1910 until 1911, he led a geological expedition to Timor. His research at Delft was mainly on the material collected during that expedition, and on the geology of the Netherlands. In 1922, he was a guide, along with A L Hall, of the Shaler Memorial Expedition to South Africa, organized by Harvard University. On the expedition he met Alexander Du Toit, both geologists were among the (at that time rare) supporters of Alfred Wegeners' continental drift theory.

Molengraaff was a close friend of W. F. Gisolf, who named his youngest son after him but died in a Japanese concentration camp.

Molengraaff retired in 1930.

== Sources ==
- F. R. van Veen, 2004, Gustaaf Molengraaff, een avontuurlijk geleerde ISBN 90-407-2433-4
- H. A. Brouwer, 1942: Levensbericht van Gustaaf Adolf Frederik Molengraaff in jaarboek der K.N.A.W. 1941–1942
- A. J. Pannekoek, 1962: Geological research at the universities of the Netherlands, 1877–1962 in Geologie & Mijnbouw, vol. 41 no. 4 pp. 161–174
