= W. F. Gisolf =

Dutch geologist and petrographer (1884–1944)

Willem Frederik Gisolf (4 September 1884 – 6 April 1944) was a Dutch geologist and petrographer who worked and taught in Bogor, Dutch East Indies.

== Early life ==
Gisolf graduated from Delft University in the early 1900s. In 1910, he married Elisabeth Jacoba Cornelia van der Waals, a niece of Johannes Diderik van der Waals, from whom he later separated. Gisolf married Johanna C.A. zur Kleinsmiede (born 1903) in 1925.

He invested in a company controlled by W.H. Gispen, who had married his sister Annie Gisolf. From 1925 to 1940 Gisolf was Director of the Hogere Burger School (HBS) (Dutch secondary education) in Bandung in Indonesia. He died in a Japanese concentration camp in Tjimahi in 1944.

== Career ==
Gisolf dedicated his thesis—"Beschrijving van een microscopisch onderzoek van Gabbros en Amfibolieten herkomstig van Midden-Celebes"—to G.A.F. Molengraaff, his close friend. W.F. Gisolf is further well known from his publication in the "Jaarboek van het Mijnwezen in N.O.I." from 1924 with the title "De meteoriet van Tjerebon".

In the "Jaarboek voor het mijnwezen" Gisolf published various articles between 1920 and 1930. He wrote an article in a German Journal, the "Mineralogische und Petrografische Mitteilungen", called "Zur graphischen Darstellung von Gesteinsanalysen". In this article, dated 4 September 1927 in Bandoeng, he uses the same graphic analytical tools he later used in recording the results of his pupils at the HBS. The Singapore-based "Straits" newspaper mentioned on 4 June 1924 that Gisolf had found out that a certain mineral, supposed to be iron-ore, showed signs of high radium activity.

== Writings, travels and affiliations ==
He was correspondent for the natural science division of the Royal Netherlands Academy for the Sciences. Between 1917 and 1919, he was member of the "Rotterdamse Natuurhistorische Club". In 1919, he joined the "Bataafsch Genootschap der Proefondervindelijke Wijsbegeerte", as recorded in its memorial "Herdenking van het 150-jarig bestaan", dated 17 August 1919.

For Abendanon he categorized and analyzed the geological finds of his "Midden Celebes-expeditie".

In 1938 he visited New Zealand from 19 November to 17 December; in the well-known New Zealand newspaper "The Evening Post" he was quoted from an interview with an "Otago Daily Times" representative, on his views about the Chinese and the Japanese in the Dutch East Indies. During that visit, he also met with professor Benson, whom he is supposed to have met in Japan in 1926.

The local paper mentioned the hotel he stayed in, the Midland Hotel. The newspapers duly recorded his departure on 'Hr Ms Tasman, with Saigon as ultimate destination via Sidney.

== Legacy ==
Many former pupils have affectionately recorded their memories of their former headmaster (follow link below). In essence he was labeled strict but fair. Remarkably, in 1932 he supported the formation of a student association "Spes patriae" which formulated first thoughts about an independent Indonesian state, in close collaboration with the Kingdom of the Netherlands. Many high-ranking officials of the later Republic of Indonesia got their higher education at the HBS in Bandoeng.

A unique publication was a scientific analysis of the results of the school where he was the director, entitled "De resultaten van het onderwijs". In this study, he applied scientific methods and a statistical analytical approach to the results of his students. This allowed for practical feedback to the teachers involved, and constituted one of the first scientific studies into the educational field.

Gisolf admired Molengraaff so much that he named his youngest son after Molengraaff (Gustaaf Adolf Frederik Gisolf).
