= Mount Beney =

Mountain in Antarctica

- Location within Antarctica

Highest point
- Coordinates: 80°16′S 27°45′W

Geography
- Location: Shackleton Range, Antarctica

Mount Beney is the largest of the La Grange Nunataks, rising to 1,000 m in the north part of Shackleton Range. It was roughly mapped by the Commonwealth Trans-Antarctic Expedition in 1957, and it was photographed from the air by U.S. Navy in 1967 and surveyed by the British Antarctic Survey (BAS) between 1968 and 1971. It was named by the United Kingdom Antarctic Place-Names Committee (UK-APC) for Sgt. Ivor C. Beney, RE, a member of the Royal Society IGY Expedition at Shackleton station in 1957 who assisted with preparations for the Commonwealth Trans-Antarctic Expedition between 1955 and 1958.
