= Sidney H. Haughton =

South African paleontologist and geologist

- Born: Sidney Henry Haughton; 7 May 1888; Bethnal Green, London, England
- Died: 24 May 1982 (aged 94); Pretoria, South Africa
- Occupation: Paleontologist
- Years active: 1936—1964

Sidney Henry Haughton FRS (7 May 1888 – 24 May 1982) was an English-born South African paleontologist and geologist best known for his description of the sauropodomorph dinosaur Melanorosaurus in 1924, and his work on the geology of the Witwatersrand.

Haughton was born on 7 May 1888 in Bethnal Green, London. He was the eldest of three children born to Henry Charles Haughton and Alice Aves.

During World War I, Haughton enlisted with the Royal Army Medical Corps, was posted to Egypt and then India, and picked up malaria, leading to his discharge from the army.

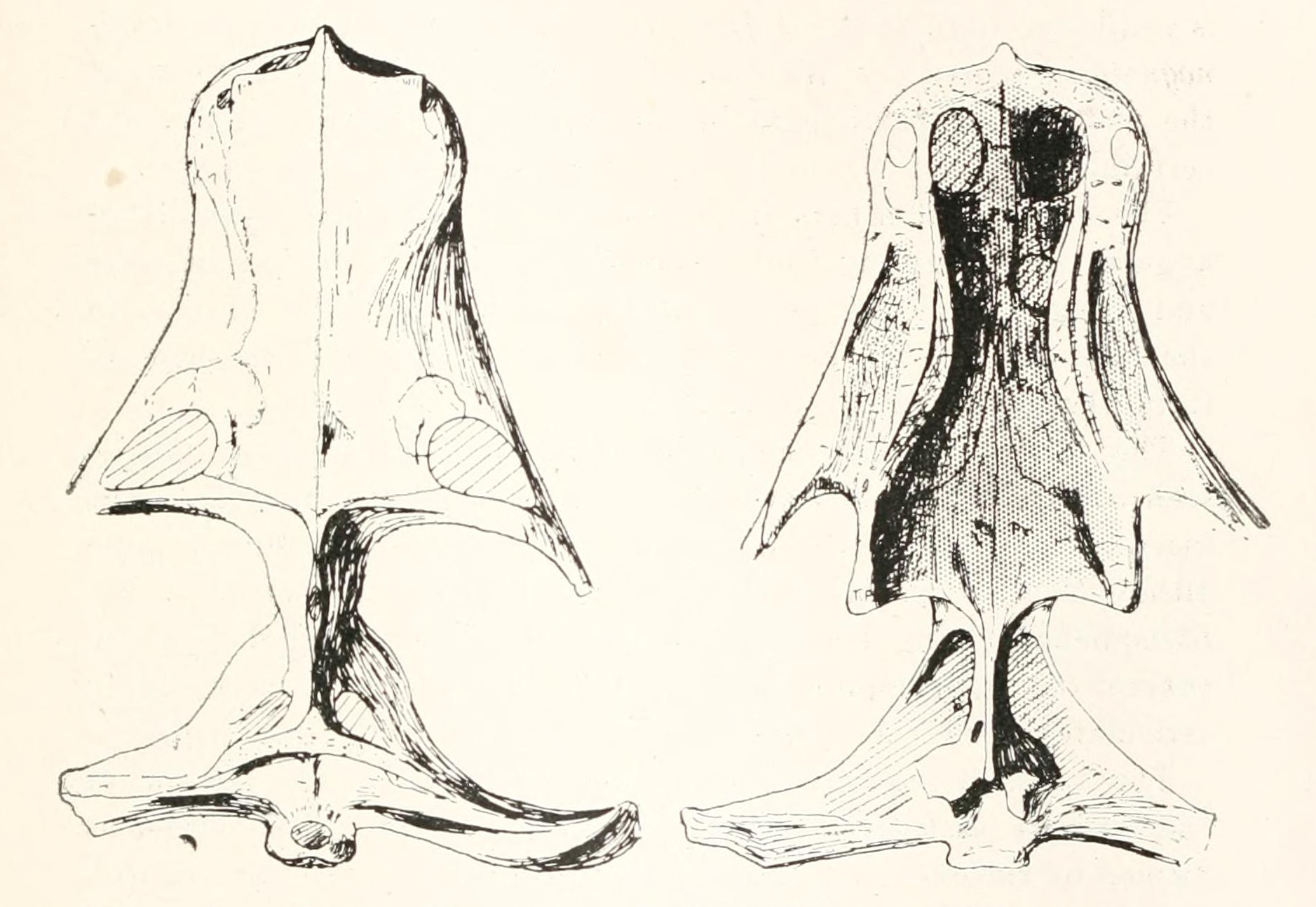
Holotype skull of Whaitsia platyceps by Sydney H. Haughton, 1918.

He was elected a Fellow of the Royal Society in 1961. His candidature citation read: "Honorary Director of Bernard Price Institute for Palaeontological Research, Witwatersrand University; formerly Director of the Geological Survey of South Africa and Chief Geologist, South Africa Atomic Energy Board. The outstanding living authority on the geology of South Africa. Distinguished for the value and wide range of contributions to the geology of southern and central Africa especially in the fields of palaeozoology, stratigraphy and economic geology. To the systematic study of Karoo reptiles alone he has devoted 37 papers; other researches contain mollusca, fishes, amphibia and mammalia. Currently is co-ordinating geological studies throughout Africa south of the Sahara. The list of 106 publications is attached."

In 1961, Haughton was also awarded the senior medal of the Geological Society of South Africa, the Draper Memorial Medal.

Haughton's work on South African geology culminated in the 1964 publication of Gold Deposits of the Witwatersrand Basin: The Geology of Some Ore Deposits of Southern Africa, Volume 1, a collection of 18 papers on Witwatersrand geology.

== Publications ==
- The stratigraphic history of Africa south of the Sahara
- The geology of the country around Mossel bay, Cape Province - (Government Printer, 1937)
- The geology of portion of the coastal belt near the Gamtoos valley, Cape Province - (Printed in the Union of South Africa by the Government Printer, 1937)
- Results of an investigation into the possible presence of oil in Karroo rocks in parts of the Union of South Africa - (Dept. of Mines, 1953)
- Geological history of Southern Africa - (Geological Society of South Africa, 1969)
- Trans-Karroo excursion - (printed by the Natal witness, 1970)
- The Australopithecine fossils of Africa and their geological setting - Witwaterstrand University Press/Institute for the Study of Man in Africa, 1964)
- The stratigraphic history of Africa south of the Sahara - (Hafner Pub. Co., 1963)
- The stratigraphic history of Africa south of the Sahara - (Oliver & Boyd, 1963)
- The geology of some ore deposits in southern Africa - (Geological Society of South Africa, 1964)

== Gallery ==
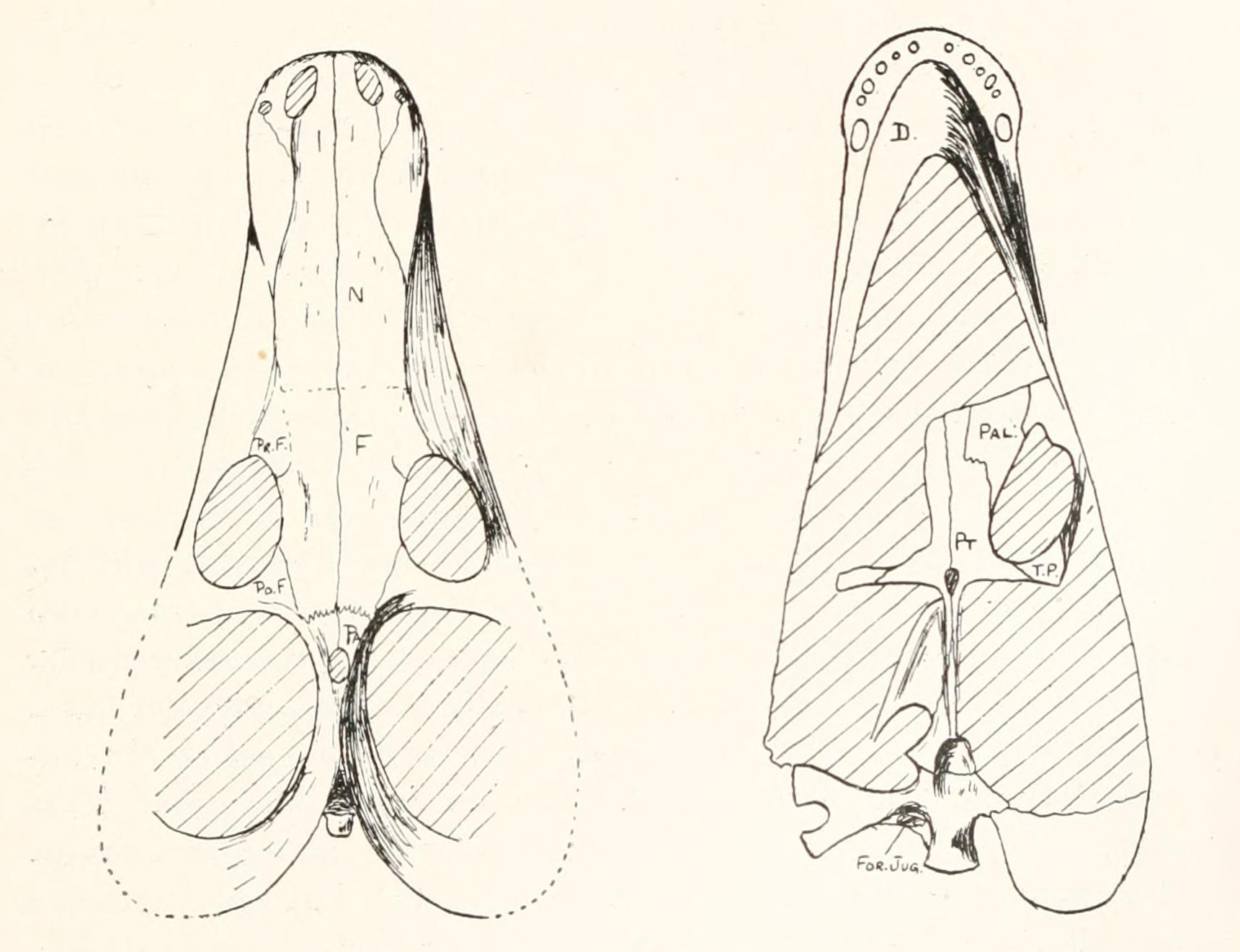
Skull of Alopecognathus minor by Sydney H. Haughton, 1918.

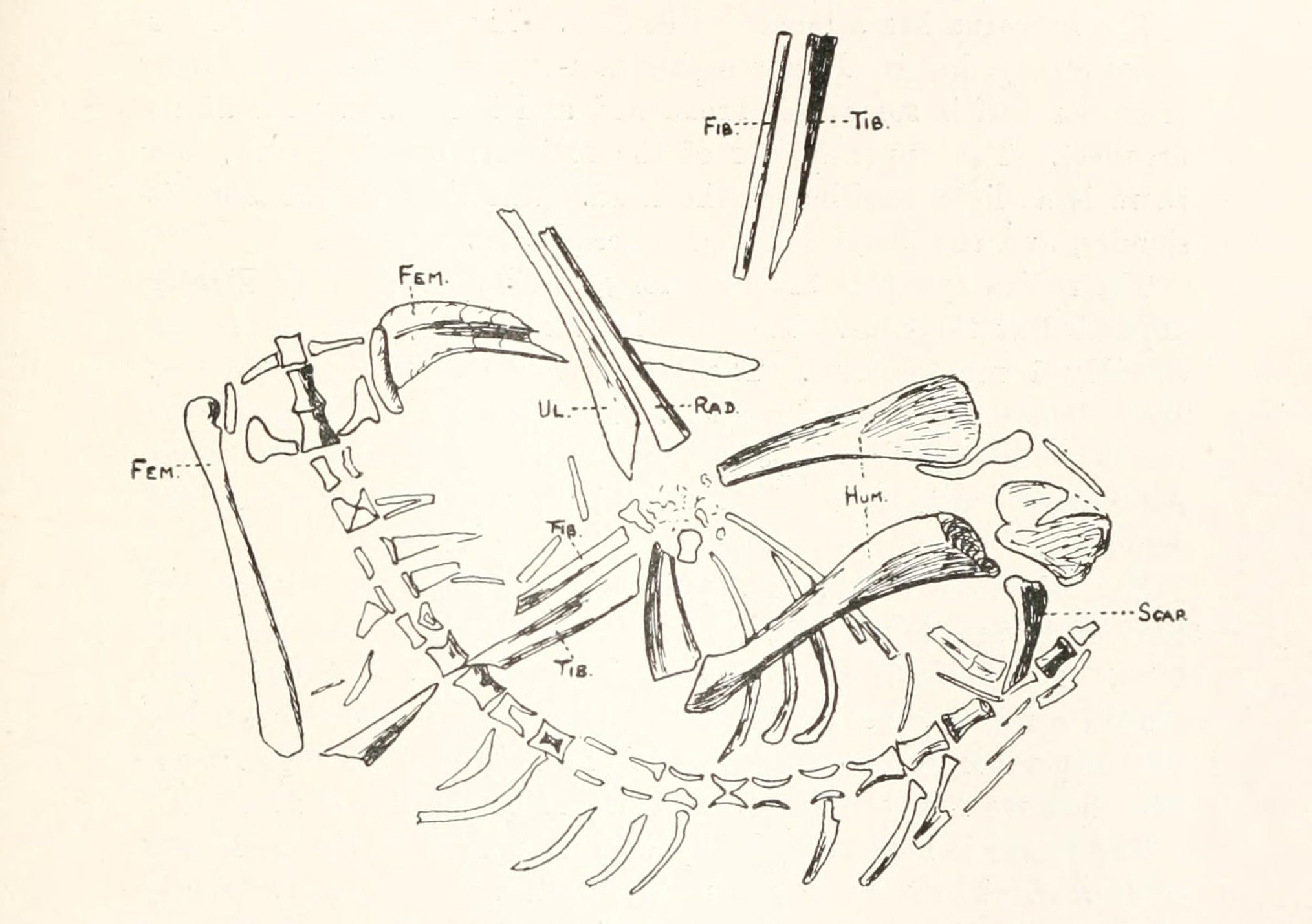
Holotype skeleton of Macroscelesaurus janseni by Sydney H. Haughton, 1918.
