= Samuel James Shand =

British mineralogist and petrologist

- Born: 29 October 1882; Edinburgh
- Died: 19 April 1957 (aged 74); Broughty Ferry
- Education: University of St Andrews; University of Münster
- Awards: Lyell Medal (1950)
- Scientific career
- Fields: Geology
- Workplaces: Royal Scottish Museum; Stellenbosch University; Columbia University

Prof Samuel James Shand FRSE (1882–1957) was a British mineralogist and petrologist, specialising in silicate analysis and igneous petrology.

== Life ==
He was born in Edinburgh on 29 October 1882 the son of James Shand (1851–1929), originally from Sandsting in Shetland, and Catherine Grant Hunter from Lerwick in Shetland. In 1881 the family had moved from Shetland to Taap Hall, a curious Georgian tenement on Ferry Road in the Leith district. However they moved to "Selivoe" on Park Road in the Newhaven district and James was born there.

Shand received his secondary education at George Watson's College, Edinburgh, and then in 1905 received his BSc in science from University College, Dundee, which from 1897 to 1967 was part of the University of St Andrews. He then became a graduate student at the University of Münster and received a PhD (Promotion) there in 1906 with thesis advisor Karl Busz. Upon Shand's return to Scotland, he became an assistant curator in charge of the geological collections at the Royal Scottish Museum in Edinburgh from 1907 to 1911. He received a D.Sc. from the University of St Andrews in 1910. Shand became in 1911 professor of geology and mineralogy at Victoria College, Stellenbosch (which was renamed Stellenbosch University in 1918). During WWI he served in the Royal Engineers as a lieutenant, helping to find water resources for the British army in the Middle East.

Shand established the geology department of Stellenbosch University and published approximately 30 papers on various aspects of the geology and mineralogy of southern Africa. In 1914 he presented fossils from the Bokkeveld Group and a collection of rocks to the McGregor Museum in Kimberley. Shand discovered, among rock specimens sent to him by P. H. S. de Wet in 1913, pseudotachylyte, which, in 1916, Shand was the first to scientifically describe.

His classification of eruptive rocks was based mainly on the extent to which the rocks were saturated with silica, their mineralogical composition and texture. The classification was later developed further in his book Eruptive rocks; their genesis, composition, classification, and their relation to ore deposits (London, 1927; 4th ed. 1951), which ensured his international reputation. According to Scholtz (1946) his classification of eruptive rocks and studies of the petrology of South African alkaline rocks constitute one of the most fundamental contributions made by members of the Geological Society of South Africa during its first 50 years.

Shand resigned in 1937 from Stellenbosch University to become a professor of petrology at Columbia University, remaining there until his retirement in 1950 when he returned to Scotland. In retirement he helped to reorganise some of the same museum collections in Edinburgh that he worked on forty years earlier.

He was elected a Fellow of the Royal Society of Edinburgh in 1952. His proposers were Sir Edward Battersby Bailey, Robert Campbell, Douglas Allan and Archibald Gordon MacGregor.

His parents had moved to Broughty Ferry near Dundee and recreated a family home there. He died at 1 Fintry Place in Broughty Ferry on 11 April 1957.

== Family ==
In 1913 he married Anna Davidson (d.1947).

He was younger brother to Dr John Glendinning Bryden Shand who moved to Glasgow.

== Shand's definition of alkaline rock ==
The alkalies Na_{2}O and K_{2}O are present in varying amounts among alkaline rocks, and petrologists disagree on the precise definition of the term "alkaline rock".

Shand (1922)

proposed that an alkaline rock is one in which the alkalies are in excess of the alkali feldspar molecular ratio [(Na_{2}O + K_{2}):Al_{2}O_{3}:SiO_{2}] of 1:1:6, with either Al_{2}O_{3} or SiO_{2} being deficient.

Shand (1943) also defined a peralkalinity index.

== Awards and honours ==
Shand was elected a fellow of the Royal Society of Edinburgh, the Mineralogical Society of Great Britain and Ireland, and the Geological Society of London, which awarded him in 1950 its Lyell Medal. He was for the year 1923 the president of the Geological Society of South Africa, which awarded him in 1937 its Draper Memorial Medal. The mineral shandite, a lead-nickel-sulfide occurring in the serpentine subgroup, was discovered and named in his honour by Paul Ramdohr in 1950.

== Selected publications ==
=== Articles ===
- "On the occurrence of the Brazilian trilobite Pennaia in the Bokkeveld Beds". Transactions of the Geological Society of South Africa. 17 (1): 24–28. 1914.
- Shand, S. J. (1915). "The alkaline rocks of South West-Africa". Geological Magazine. 2 (12): 575–576. Bibcode:1915GeoM....2..575S. doi:10.1017/S0016756800203877.
- Shand, S. J. (1916). "A recording micrometer for geometrical rock analysis". The Journal of Geology. 24 (4): 394–404. Bibcode:1916JG.....24..394S. doi:10.1086/622346. S2CID 129370282.
- Shand, S. J. (1949). "Rocks of the Mid-Atlantic Ridge". The Journal of Geology. 57 (1): 89–92. Bibcode:1949JG.....57...89S. doi:10.1086/625580. S2CID 131014204.
- Shand, S. J. (1945). "Coronas and coronites". Geological Society of America Bulletin. 56 (3): 247–266. Bibcode:1945GSAB...56..247S. doi:10.1130/0016-7606(1945)56[247:CAC]2.0.CO;2.
- "The present status of Daly's hypothesis of the alkaline rocks" (PDF). American Journal of Science. 23: 495–507. 1945.

=== Books ===
- The study of rocks. London: T. Murby & Co. 1931, 224 pages; rev. & enlarged 3rd ed. 1959
- Earth-lore: Geology without jargon. London: T. Murby & Co. 1933.; rev. & enlarged 2nd ed. 1937
- Rocks for chemists; an introduction to petrology for chemists and students of chemistry. London: T. Murby & Co. 1952, 146 pages

Eruptive rocks; their genesis, composition, classification, and their relation to ore deposits. London: T. Murby & Co. 1927.; 4th ed. 1951
