= Petersen Peak =

Petersen Peak (80°27′S 27°57′W) is a rock peak (1,215 m) standing 6 nautical miles (11 km) southwest of Morris Hills in the north-central part of Shackleton Range. It was first mapped in 1957 by the Commonwealth Trans-Antarctic Expedition and named for Hans C. Petersen, the captain of the Danish ship Magga Dan which transported members of the Commonwealth Trans-Antarctic Expedition to the Filchner Ice Shelf in 1956–57.
