= Crossover Pass =

Coordinates: 80°38′S 26°30′W

Crossover Pass is a pass between Gordon Glacier and Cornwall Glacier in the central part of the Shackleton Range in Antarctica. It was first mapped in 1957 by the Commonwealth Trans-Antarctic Expedition and so named because this pass, together with Gordon and Cornwall Glaciers, provides a sledging route across the Shackleton Range from north to south.
