= Mount Sheffield =

Mountain in Antarctica

Mount Sheffield (80°10′S 25°42′W) is a rocky mountain, 915 m, at the junction of Gordon and Slessor Glaciers on the north side of the Shackleton Range. It was first mapped in 1957 by the Commonwealth Trans-Antarctic Expedition and named for Alfred H. Sheffield, the chairman of the radio communications working group for the IGY, who was of great assistance in this field to the Commonwealth Trans-Antarctic Expedition of 1955–58.
