= Cornwall Glacier (Coats Land) =

Glacier in Coats Land, Antarctica

- Location within Antarctica
- Location: Coats Land
- Coordinates: 80°47′S 26°16′W
- Length: 9 nmi (17 km; 10 mi)
- Thickness: unknown
- Terminus: Shackleton Range
- Status: unknown

Cornwall Glacier (80°47′S 26°16′W) is a glacier 9 nautical miles (17 km) long, flowing south from Crossover Pass in the Shackleton Range to join Recovery Glacier east of Ram Bow Bluff.

== Exploration ==
Cornwall Glacier was first mapped in 1957 by the Commonwealth Trans-Antarctic Expedition, and named for General Sir James Handyside Marshall-Cornwall, a member of the Committee of Management of the Commonwealth Trans-Antarctic Expedition, 1955–58.

== Location ==
Cornwall Glacier slopes south from the Shotton Snowfield to the Recovery Glacier, which it reaches between the Du Toit Nunataks to the east and the Stephenson Bastion to the west. Cornwall Glacier is relatively short and immature.

It appears to be static.

The valleys on either side probably do not contribute ice.

The glacier originates near Crossover Pass and Spath Crest, which lie on the ice divide in the Shackleton Mountains, with Cornwall Glacier flowing south from this area while Gordon Glacier flows north.

The valleys of the Gordon and Cornwall glaciers may reflect an underlying fault zone, and have been treated as a divide between the western and eastern portions of the Shackleton Range.

== See also ==
- List of glaciers in the Antarctic
- Glaciology

== Sources ==
- Alberts, Fred G., ed. (1995), Geographic Names of the Antarctic (PDF) (2 ed.), United States Board on Geographic Names This article incorporates public domain material from websites or documents of the United States Board on Geographic Names.
- Höfle, Hans-Christian; Buggisch, Werner (1993), "Glacial Geology and Petrography of Erratics in the Shackleton Range, Antarctica" (PDF), Polarforschung, vol. 63, no. 213, pp. 183–201
- Shackleton Range, United States Geological Survey, 1983 This article incorporates public domain material from websites or documents of the United States Geological Survey.
- Skidmore, Michael J.; Clarkson, Peter D. (1972), "Physiography and Glacial Geomorphology of the Shackleton Range" (PDF), Antarctic Survey Bulletin, no. 30
