= Arthur William Rogers =

Arthur William Rogers (5 June 1872 in Bishops Hull near Taunton, Somerset – 23 June 1946 in Mowbray, Cape Town, Cape Province) was a British and South African geologist. He was Director of the Geological Survey of South Africa.

== Career ==
Rogers studied at the University of Cambridge. From 1895 he was in South Africa, first in 1896–1902 as Assistant Geologist, from 1902–1911 as Geologist, and from 1911–1916 as Assistant Director of the Cape of Good Hope Geological Commission. In 1916 in Pretoria he became Director of the Geological Survey of South Africa, in which capacity he remained until his retirement in 1932. During his directorship, the International Congress of Geologists met in South Africa in 1929.

Initially, under the direction of Professor E. H. L. Schwarz, Rogers charted remote regions of the Cape Province to the borders of the Kalahari. In the Transvaal, he mapped the gold fields of Heidelberg and Klerksdorp.

In 1931 he received the Wollaston Medal of the Geological Society of London. In 1918 he was elected FRS. In 1935–1936 he was President of the Royal Society of South Africa.

== Works ==
- An introduction to the geology of Cape Colony, Longmans, Green and Co., 1905, Online
- The pioneers in South African Geology and their work, Geological Society of South Africa 1937

== Sources ==
- W. J. de Kock (ed.) Dictionary of South African Biography, vol. 1, p. 677
