= Herbert Maufe =

British geologist

Herbert Brantwood Maufe
- Born: August 27, 1879; Ilkley, Yorkshire
- Died: May 8, 1946 (aged 66); London
- Education: Bradford Grammar School; Christ's College, Cambridge (B.A., 1901; M.A., 1926)
- Known for: Geology of Southern Rhodesia
- Awards: Lyell Medal, 1930; Draper Medal, 1934
- Scientific career
- Workplaces: H.M. Geological Survey; Geological Survey of Southern Rhodesia

Herbert Brantwood Maufe (27 August 1879 – 8 May 1946) was a British geologist, who first recognised the structure of the Glencoe caldera, and was later the first director of the Geological Survey of Southern Rhodesia. He was awarded the Lyell Medal of the Geological Society of London in 1930.

== Early life and education ==
Maufe was born Herbert Muff in Ilkley, Yorkshire, to Henry Muff and Maude Alice Muff, née Smithies. He had a younger brother Edward, who became an architect, and a sister. Maufe went to school at Bradford Grammar School, and in 1897 took up a place at Christ’s College, Cambridge. He graduated with a first class degree in the Natural Sciences Tripos in 1901, and was awarded the Harkness Prize for Geology. He was awarded an M.A. degree in 1926.

In 1909, his father and uncles, Charles and Frederick, changed the family name by deed poll from Muff to Maufe, reverting to the old form of their surname.

== Career ==
In 1901, Maufe joined the Geological Survey, and began his work in Scotland, working first on the Lanarkshire coalfield under Charles Clough, and later in the Western Highlands. He was also spent some time doing fieldwork in the west of Ireland, with George Lamplugh. In Western Scotland, Maufe was the first to recognise that both Glen Coe and Ben Nevis had formed as collapsed volcanic calderas; he also recognised the great overturned fold of Ballachulish; and the nature of the parallel dyke swarms of Etive and Mull. From December 1905 until September 1906, Maufe spent time working for the Colonial Service in the East Africa Protectorate (present day Kenya), carrying out a geological survey of the new rail-cuttings along the length of the Uganda Railway, from Mombasa to Nairobi. Several of Maufe's field notebooks from 1906 are held in the Bodleian Library, Oxford.

In 1910, Maufe took up the position as the first director of the newly established geological survey of Southern Rhodesia (now Zimbabwe), where he worked for the rest of his career. He established the base for the survey in Bulawayo, and set about reconnaissance geological mapping and prospecting for mineral deposits. During the First World War, Maufe was a Lieutenant with the Rhodesia Motor Volunteers, from 1914 to 1919.

He produced the first geological map of the country in 1922, and a second edition in 1928. Maufe retired from the survey in August 1934. In 1940, the new director of the survey, Ben Lightfoot, invited Maufe to return to assist the survey due to the loss of staff to wartime activities. Maufe worked again for the survey from December 1940 to May 1945. He subsequently returned to the United Kingdom overland.

== Recognition ==
In 1909, Maufe was awarded the Lyell fund of the Geological Society of London. In 1918, Maufe was elected President of the Geological Survey of South Africa, and delivered a presidential address in Johannesburg in March 1918. Maufe was awarded the Lyell Medal of the Geological Society of London in 1930, and the Draper Medal of the Geological Society of South Africa in 1934.

== Family ==
Maufe married Doris de Lisle Thompson in 1914. He died suddenly, in London, in 1946.
