= Alexander du Toit =

South African geologist (1878–1948)

Alexander Logie du Toit
- Born: 14 March 1878; Newlands, Cape Town, Cape Colony
- Died: 25 February 1948 (aged 69)
- Education: University of the Cape of Good Hope; Royal Technical College; Drury College; Royal College of Science
- Awards: Murchison Medal (1933)
- Scientific career
- Fields: Geologist
- Workplaces: Geological Commission of the Cape of Good Hope; De Beers Consolidated Mines

Alexander Logie du Toit FRS (/duːˈtɔɪ/ doo-TOY; 14 March 1878 – 25 February 1948) was a geologist from South Africa and an early supporter of Alfred Wegener's theory of continental drift.

== Early life and education ==
Du Toit was born in Newlands, Cape Town in 1878, and educated at the Diocesan College in Rondebosch and the University of the Cape of Good Hope. Encouraged by his grandfather, Captain Alexander Logie, he graduated in 1899 in mining engineering at the Royal Technical College in Glasgow. After a short period studying geology at the Royal College of Science in London, he returned to Glasgow to lecture in geology, mining and surveying at the University of Glasgow and the Royal Technical College.

== Career ==
In 1903, du Toit was appointed as a geologist within the Geological Commission of the Cape of Good Hope, and he began to develop an extensive knowledge of the geology of southern Africa by mapping large portions of the Karoo and its dolerite intrusions, publishing numerous papers on the subject. Subsequently, he mapped the entire Karoo System through the complete stratigraphy from Dwyka tillite to the basalt of the Drakensberg. He worked at a furious rate but was known for his painstaking meticulousness, as reflected in his 1937 book Our Wandering Continents. It still bears reading for its creative and closely argued theses in the light of the geology of the day, and is soberingly consistent with modern principles of plate tectonics.

In 1920, du Toit joined the Union Irrigation Department as water geologist, and in 1927, he became chief consulting geologist to De Beers Consolidated Mines until his retirement in 1941.

In 1923, he received a grant from the Carnegie Institution of Washington, and used this to travel to eastern South America to study the geology of Argentina, Paraguay and Brazil. As is apparent from his remarks in "Our Wandering Continents", he had requested support for the expedition not on a whim but specifically to test his predictions of correspondences between the geology of both continents. In the event, he was able to demonstrate and follow the predicted continuation of specific features that he had already documented in Southern Africa, into the continent of South America. Although it might perhaps seem less impressive to the layman, that evidence was far more convincing to the geologist than was the matching of continental shelves.

In the light of his research, du Toit published a review of the stratigraphic and radioisotope evidence from those regions that supported Wegener's ideas, A Geological Comparison of South America with South Africa (1927). His best-known publication, Our Wandering Continents (1937), expanded and improved this work and, departing somewhat from Wegener, proposed two original supercontinents separated by the Tethys Ocean, a northern/equatorial Laurasia and a southern/polar Gondwanaland.

== Awards and honours ==
In 1933, du Toit was awarded the Murchison Medal by the Geological Society of London, and in 1943, he became a Fellow of the Royal Society.

In 1949, the year after his death, the Geological Society of South Africa inaugurated a biennial lecture series in his honour that continues to the present day.

In 1973, a 75 km crater on Mars (71.8°S, 49.7°W) was named "Du Toit" in recognition of his work.

== Significant works ==
- du Toit, A.L. (1926) The Geology of South Africa, Oliver & Boyd, London, UK
- du Toit, A.L. and Reed, F.R.C. (1927) A Geological Comparison of South America with South Africa, Carnegie Institution of Washington, Washington, USA
- du Toit, A.L. (1937) Our Wandering Continents; An Hypothesis of Continental Drifting, Oliver & Boyd, London, UK
