= Read Mountains =

Mountains in Antarctica

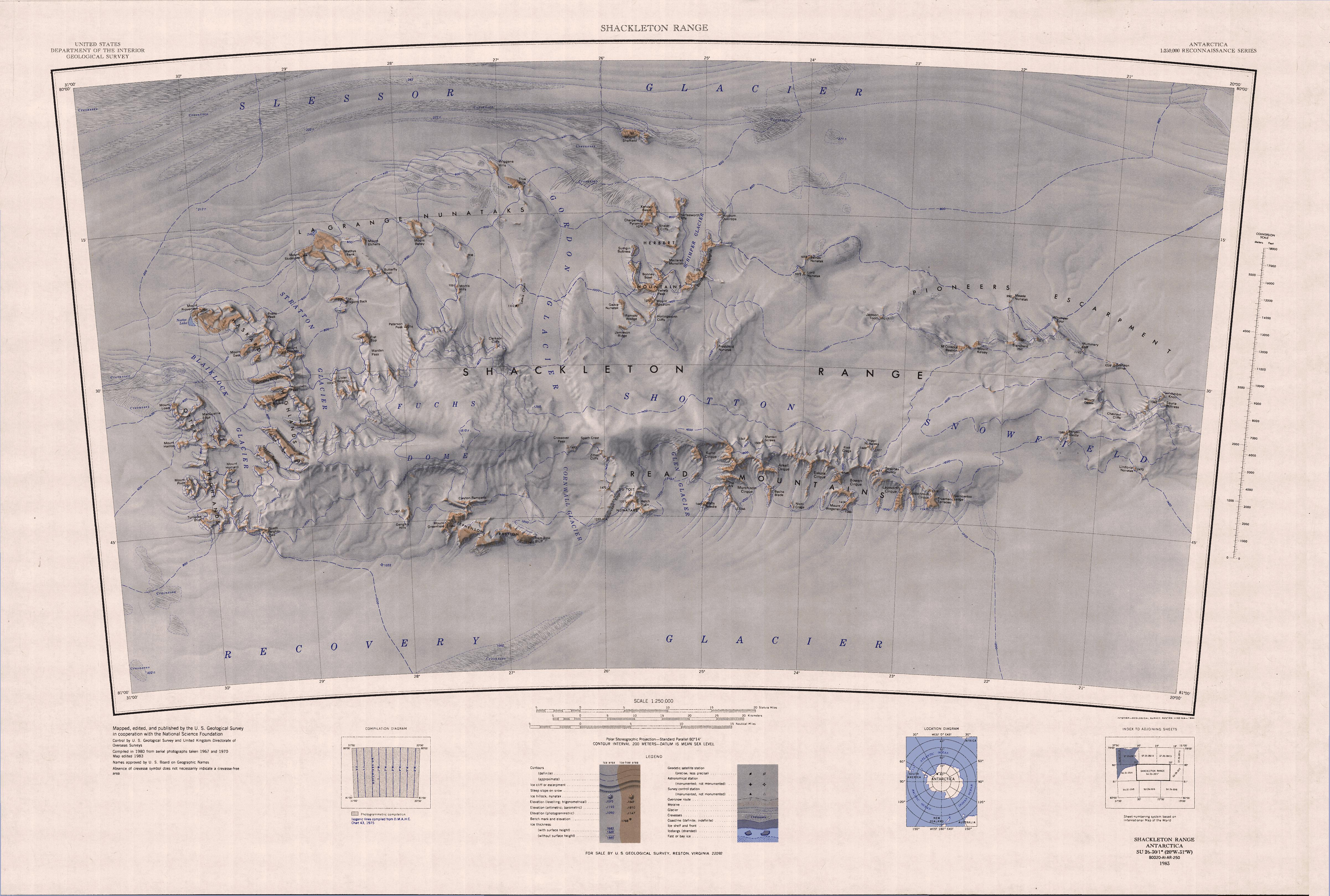
- Shackleton Range, Read Mountains in lower right

Highest point
- Peak: Holmes Summit
- Elevation: 1,875 m (6,152 ft)

Geography
- Location within Antarctica
- Range coordinates: 80°42′S 24°45′W

Read Mountains is a group of rocky summits, the highest being Holmes Summit at 1,875 metres (6,152 ft), lying east of Glen Glacier in the south-central part of the Shackleton Range.

== Name ==
The Read Mountains were first mapped in 1957 by the Commonwealth Trans-Antarctic Expedition (CTAE). They are named for Professor Herbert Harold Read, Chairman of the Scientific Committee and member of the Committee of Management of the Commonwealth Trans-Antarctic Expedition, 1955–58.

== Location ==
The Read Mountains form the southern rim of the eastern part of the Shackleton Range. To the north is the Shotton Snowfield. The Recovery Glacier runs west along the south face of the mountains. To the west the Cornwall Glacier separates the Read Mountains from the Stephenson Bastion. Isolated nunataks of the Pioneers Escarpment lie to the northeast and east of the mountains.

The Reid Mountains are a group of arêtes extending south from the 200 to 400 metres (660 to 1,310 ft) high escarpment along the southern edge of the Shotton Snowfield. Between the arêtes there are cirques floored with blue ice that slope gently down to the Recovery Glacier. The mountains are mostly made up of schists and gneisses, but Mount Wegener and the ridges east are topped with slates. These flat-topped ridges are remains of a peneplain that had an elevation of around 1,500 metres (4,900 ft) in this area.

== Geology ==
The southern belt of the Shackleton Range is exposed in the Read Mountains. It has medium- to high-grade metamorphic rocks classified as the Read Group. They are mainly composed of partly migmatised quartzitic, basic, calcareous and pelitic rocks. In places they are interlayered with gneissic granites, and intruded by granites and basic rocks. Dating of the metagranites gives ages of around 1,760 and 1,600 million years. Rb–Sr and K-Ar mineral cooling ages are 1650–1550 million years.

The Southern Terrane has detritus up to 2,850 million years old that experienced magmatism from 1,850 to 1,810 million years ago, a metamorphic event between 1,710 and 1,680 years ago, and another metamorphic event 510 million years ago. Tectonics in the Southern Terrane during the Paleoproterozoic were very similar to that of the Mawson Continent, which may mean that this continent extends over the Eastern Antarctic Shield and includes the Shackleton Range.

== Escarpment features ==
Named features of the escarpment north of the range are, from west to east:

=== Mantell Screes ===
A rock spur (80°38′S 24°26′W) rising to c. 1,500 metres (4,900 ft) and bounded by screes (taluses), located northwest of Arkell Cirque on the north side of the Read Mountains, Shackleton Range. Photographed from the air by the U.S. Navy, 1967, and surveyed by BAS, 1968-71. In association with the names of geologists grouped in this area, named by the UK-APC in 1971 after Gideon A. Mantell (1790–1852), English surgeon and geologist, known for his discovery of the iguanodon and three other fossil reptiles.

=== Flett Crags ===
Rock crags (80°39′S 23°35′W) on the north slope of Read Mountains, 5 miles (8.0 km) north of Mount Wegener, in the Shackleton Range. Photographed from the air by the U.S. Navy in 1967. Surveyed by BAS, 1968-71. In association with the names of geologists grouped in this area, named by the UK-APC after Sir John Smith Flett (1869-1947), British geologist who worked on Scottish geology and volcanoes; Director, Geological Survey and Museum of Practical Geology (later British Geological Survey), 1920–35.

Flett Crags gives its name to the Flett Crags Formation of the Late Precambrian Turnpike Bluff Group. The formation is over 1,500 metres (4,900 ft) thick and is mainly composed of slates, with minor quartzites and some pebble conglomerates. It overlays the Middle Precambrian Shackleton Range Metamorphic Complex of gneisses, schists and amphibolites.

=== Niggli Nunataks ===
A group of nunataks (80°38′S 23°20′W) 6 miles (9.7 km) north-north-east of Mount Wegener, rising to 1,470 metres (4,820 ft) near the east end of the Read Mountains, Shackleton Range. Photographed from the air by the U.S. Navy, 1967. Surveyed by BAS, 1968-71. In association with the names of geologists grouped in this area, named by the UK-APC in 1971 after Paul Niggli (1888-1953), Swiss geologist who introduced the cataloguing of magma types by molecular or Niggli values; Professor of Geology, University of Zurich.

=== Strachey Stump ===
A flat-topped mountain (80°41′S 23°10′W) rising to 1,630 metres (5,350 ft), 5 miles (8.0 km) northeast of Mount Wegener in Read Mountains, Shackleton Range. Photographed from the air by the U.S. Navy, 1967. Surveyed by BAS, 1968-71. In association with names of geologists grouped in this area, named by the UK-APC in 1971 after John Strachey (1671-1742), English geologist who made one of the first attempts to construct a geological cross-section, (in Chew Valley near Somerset coalfield).

He introduced a theory of rock formations known as Stratum, based on a pictorial cross-section of the geology under his estate at Bishop Sutton and Stowey in the Chew Valley and coal seams in nearby coal works of the Somerset coalfield, projecting them according to their measured thicknesses and attitudes into unknown areas between the coal workings. The purpose was to enhance the value of his grant of a coal-lease on parts of his estate. This work was later developed by William Smith.

== Cirques ==
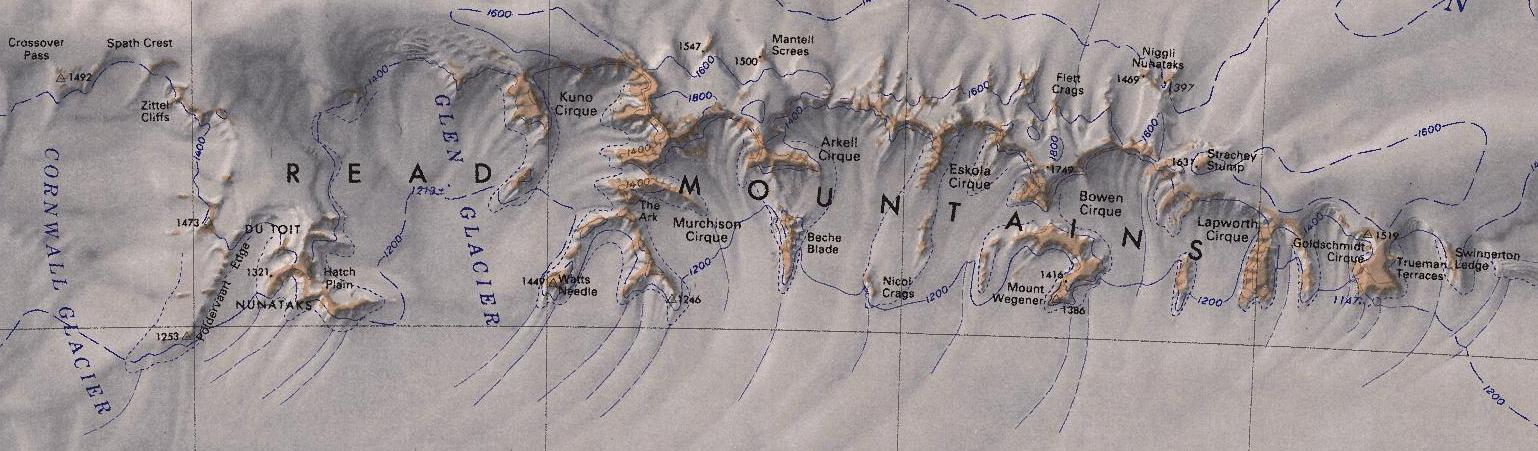
Read Mountains, with north at the top

Cirques on the south edge of the range, facing the Recovery Glacier to the south, are (from west to east):

=== Kuno Cirque ===
A glacier-filled cirque (80°40′S 24°55′W) between Glen Glacier and Murchison Cirque on the south side of the Read Mountains, Shackleton Range. The feature was photographed from the air by the U.S. Navy, 1967, and surveyed by BAS, 1968-71. In association with the names of geologists grouped in this area, named by the UK-APC in 1971 after Professor Hisashi Kuno (1910–69), Japanese petrologist, who worked on basaltic magmas.

=== Murchison Cirque ===
A glacier-filled cirque (80°42′S 24°33′W) between Kuno Cirque and Arkell Cirque on the south side of the Read Mountains, Shackleton Range. Photographed from the air by the U.S. Navy, 1967, and surveyed by BAS, 1968-71. In association with the names of geologists grouped in this area, named by the UK-APC in 1971 after Sir Roderick Impey Murchison (1792-1871), British geologist; President, Royal Geographical Society, 1843-44, 1851-52, and 1855-58; Director-General, Geological Survey of Great Britain, 1855-71.

=== Arkell Cirque ===
A large cirque (80°41′S 24°08′W) on the south face of the central Read Mountains, Shackleton Range. Photographed from the air by U.S. Navy in 1967 and surveyed from the ground by BAS, 1968–71. Named by the UK-APC after William J. Arkell (1904–58), English geologist; specialist in Jurassic stratigraphy and paleontology.

=== Eskola Cirque ===
A cirque (80°43′S 23°49′W) 2 miles (3.2 km) wide between Arkell Cirque and Bowen Cirque in central Read Mountains, Shackleton Range. Photographed from the air by the U.S. Navy, 1967. Surveyed by the BAS, 1968-71. In association with the names of geologists grouped in this area, named by the UK-APC in 1971 after Pentti Eskola (1883–1964), Finnish geologist, an authority on the Precambrian rocks of Finland and on silicate melt systems.

=== Bowen Cirque ===
A cirque (80°42′S 23°27′W) north-northeast of Mount Wegener in the Read Mountains, Shackleton Range. Photographed from the air by the U.S. Navy, 1967. Surveyed by BAS, 1968–71. In association with the names of geologists grouped in this area, named by the UK-APC in 1971 after Norman Levi Bowen (1887–1956), a Canadian-American experimental petrologist who specialized in the phase equilibria of silicate melt systems.

=== Lapworth Cirque ===
A cirque (80°44′S 23°08′W) to the west of Goldschmidt Cirque in the east portion of Read Mountains, Shackleton Range. Photographed from the air by the U.S. Navy, 1967. Surveyed by BAS, 1968-71. In association with the names of geologists grouped in this area, named by the UK-APC in 1971 after Charles Lapworth (1842-1920), British geologist who established the stratigraphic succession in south Scotland and who defined the Ordovician system; Professor of Geology and Physiography, Birmingham University, 1881–1913.

=== Goldschmidt Cirque ===
A cirque (80°44′S 22°48′W) at the west side of Trueman Terraces in the east portion of the Read Mountains, Shackleton Range. Photographed from the air by the U.S. Navy, 1967. Surveyed by the BAS, 1968-71. In association with the names of geologists grouped in this area, named by the UK-APC after Victor M. Goldschmidt (1888-1947), Norwegian geochemist and pioneer in the field of crystal chemistry.

== Other landforms ==
Mountains, ridges and escarpments include, from west to east:

=== Du Toit Nunataks ===
A group of nunataks (80°43′S 25°50′W) between Cornwall Glacier and Glen Glacier, marking the west end of the Read Mountains, Shackleton Range. Photographed from the air by the U.S. Navy, 1967, and surveyed by the BAS, 1968-71. In association with the names of geologists grouped in this area, named by the UK-APC after Alexander Logie du Toit, South African geologist.

=== Watts Needle ===
A needle-shaped peak (80°44′S 24°59′W) rising to 1,450 metres (4,760 ft)) at the southwest end of the ridge east of Glen Glacier, in the Read Mountains, Shackleton Range. Photographed from the air by the U.S. Navy, 1967, and surveyed by BAS, 1968-71. In association with the names of geologists grouped in this area, named by the UK-APC in 1971 after William Whitehead Watts (1860–1947), British geologist who worked particularly on the Precambrian rocks of the English midlands; Professor of Geology, Imperial College, London, 1906-30.

=== The Ark ===
Rock summit (80°43′S 24°47′W) rising to 1,790 metres (5,870 ft) in the central part of the Read Mountains, in the Shackleton Range. First mapped in 1957 by the CTAE. The name, given by the UK-APC, is descriptive of its shape when viewed from the west.

=== Holmes Summit ===
Peak (80°40′S 24°40′W) rising to 1,875 metres (6,152 ft), the highest elevation in the Read Mountains, Shackleton Range. Photographed from the air by the U.S. Navy, 1967, and surveyed by BAS, 1968-71. In association with the names of geologists grouped in this area, named by the UK-APC in 1971 after Professor Arthur Holmes (Holmes Hills, q.v).

=== Beche Blade ===
A sharp-crested ridge (80°43′S 24°19′W) rising to 1,600 metres (5,200 ft) between Murchison Cirque and Arkell Cirque on the south side of Read Mountains, Shackleton Range. Photographed from the air by the U.S. Navy, 1967, and surveyed by BAS, 1968–71. In association with the names of geologists grouped in this area, named in 1971 by the UK-APC after Sir Henry Thomas de la Beche (1796–1855), English geologist, first Director-General, Geological Survey of Great Britain, 1835–55.

=== Nicol Crags ===
Rock crags (80°44′S 24°05′W) rising to c. 1,300 metres (4,300 ft) to the south of Arkell Cirque in the Read Mountains, Shackleton Range. Photographed from the air by the U.S. Navy, 1967, and surveyed by BAS, 1968-71. In association with the names of geologists grouped in this area, named by the UK-APC in 1971 after William Nicol (c. 1768-1851), Scottish natural philosopher who devised the Nicol prism and the preparation of thin rock sections, thus contributing to the techniques of microscopy.

=== Mount Wegener ===
Mountain (80°44′S 23°31′W) rising to 1,385 metres (4,544 ft) in central Read Mountains, Shackleton Range. The feature was photographed from the air by the U.S. Navy, 1967. Surveyed by BAS, 1968-71. Named by the UK-APC in association with the names of geologists grouped in this area after Alfred L. Wegener (1880-1930), German astronomer, meteorologist, and Arctic explorer; a pioneer of the theory of continental drift; Professor of Geophysics and Meteorology, University of Graz, Austria, 1924-30; Leader of German expeditions to Greenland in 1929 and 1930, losing life on the ice cap in November of that year.

Mount Wegener gives its name to the Mount Wegener Formation of the Late Precambrian Turnpike Bluff Group. It consists of slate, quartzite and minor conglomerate overlying a basal sequence of quartzite and metalimestone resting unconformably on the metamorphic basement. The formation is over 2,500 metres (8,200 ft) thick, and overlays the Middle Precambrian Shackleton Range Metamorphic Complex of gneisses, schists and amphibolites.

=== Trueman Terraces ===
Ice-free terraces (80°43′S 22°41′W) rising to 1,520 metres (4,990 ft) on the east side of Goldschmidt Cirque, near the east end of Read Mountains, Shackleton Range. Photographed from the air by the U.S. Navy, 1967, and surveyed by BAS, 1968-71. In association with the names of geologists grouped in this area, named by the UK-APC after Sir Arthur E. Trueman (1895-1956), British geologist, who worked on the coal measures and their correlation by marine bands, and on the introduction of statistical methods into paleontology; Professor of Geology, Glasgow University, 1937-46; President, Geological Society of London, 1945–47.

=== Swinnerton Ledge ===
A flat-topped ridge (80°43′S 22°28′W) rising to c. 1,500 metres (4,900 ft) and marking the east end of the Read Mountains, Shackleton Range. Photographed from the air by the U.S. Navy, 1967. Surveyed by the BAS, 1968–71. In association with the names of geologists grouped in this area, named by the UK-APC after Henry Hurd Swinnerton (1876–1966), British zoologist and paleontologist, Professor of Geology, University College of Nottingham (later Nottingham University), 1912–46; President, Geological Society, 1938–40.

== Glaciers ==
=== Recovery Glacier ===
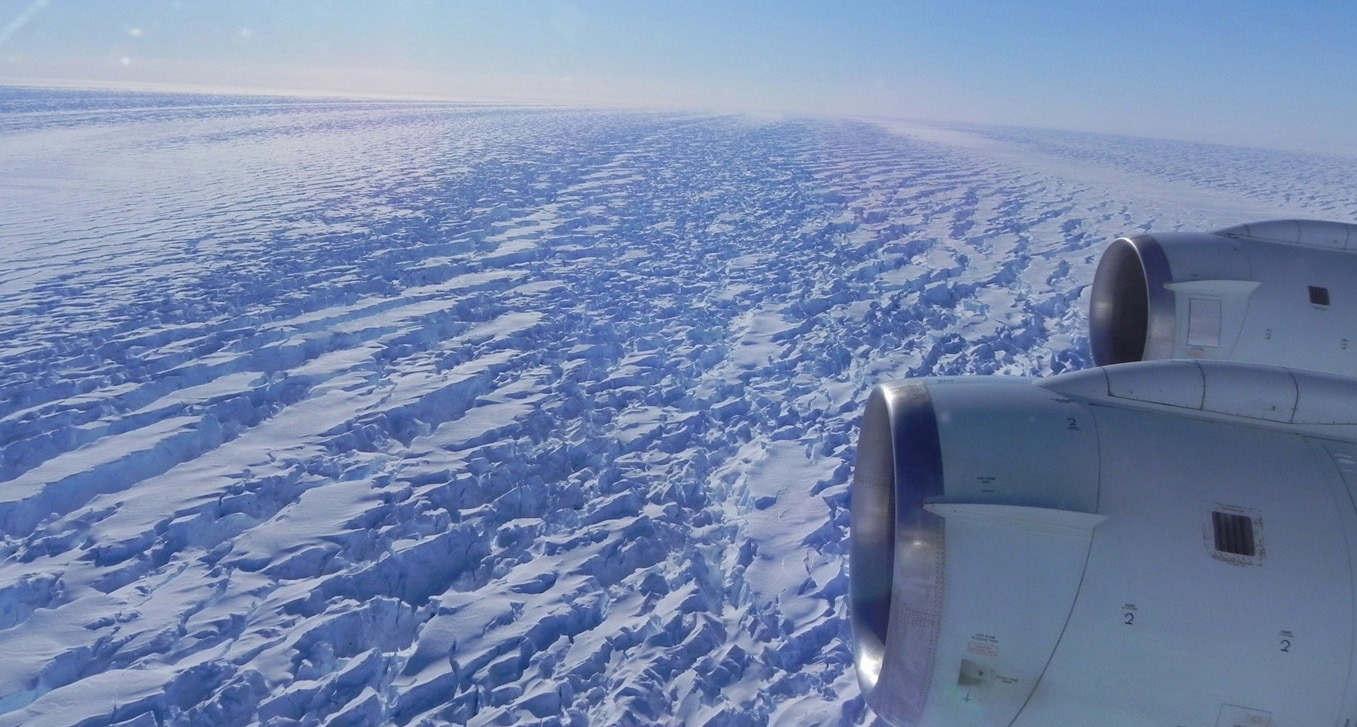
Ice stream of the Recovery Glacier from DC8

81°10′S 28°00′W. Glacier, at least 60 miles (97 km) long and 40 miles (64 km) wide at its mouth, flowing west along the south side of the Shackleton Range. First seen from the air and examined from the ground by the CTAE in 1957, and so named because of the recovery of the expedition's vehicles which repeatedly broke into bridged crevasses on this glacier during the early stages of the crossing of Antarctica.

=== Cornwall Glacier ===
80°47′S 26°16′W. Glacier 9 miles (14 km) long, flowing south from Crossover Pass in the Shackleton Range to join Recovery Glacier east of Ram Bow Bluff. First mapped in 1957 by the CTAE and named for General Sir James H. Marshall-Cornwall (1887–1985), member of the Committee of Management of the CTAE, 1955–58.

=== Glen Glacier ===
Glacier (80°44′S 25°16′W) at least 7 miles (11 km) long, flowing south in the Shackleton Range to join Recovery Glacier to the west of Read Mountains. First mapped in 1957 by the CTAE and named for Sir Alexander Glen (1912–2004), member of the Committee of Management of the CTAE, 1955–58.

== Sources ==
- Alberts, Fred G., ed. (1995), Geographic Names of the Antarctic (PDF) (2 ed.), United States Board on Geographic Names This article incorporates public domain material from websites or documents of the United States Board on Geographic Names.
- Clarkson, Peter D. (1983), "Geology of the Shackleton Range II The Turnpike Bluff Group" (PDF), British Antarctic Survey Bulletin, no. 52, pp. 109–124
- Faure, Gunter; Mensing, Teresa M. (2010), The Transantarctic Mountains: Rocks, Ice, Meteorites and Water
- "Holmes Summit", SCAR Composite Gazetteer
- Skidmore, Michael J.; Clarkson, Peter D. (1972), "Physiography and Glacial Geomorphology of the Shackleton Range" (PDF), Antarctic Survey Bulletin, no. 30
- Shackleton Range, United States Geological Survey, 1983 This article incorporates public domain material from websites or documents of the United States Geological Survey.
- Will, Thomas; Zeh, A.; Gerdes, Axel; Frimmel, Hartwig; Millar, I.L.; Schmädicke, E. (2009), "Palaeoproterozoic to Palaeozoic magmatic and metamorphic events in the Shackleton Range, East Antarctica: Constraints from zircon and monazite dating, and implications for the amalgamation of Gondwana", Precambrian Research, 172 (1–2): 25–45, doi:10.1016/j.precamres.2009.03.008
