= La Grange Nunataks =

Group of Nunataks in Antarctica

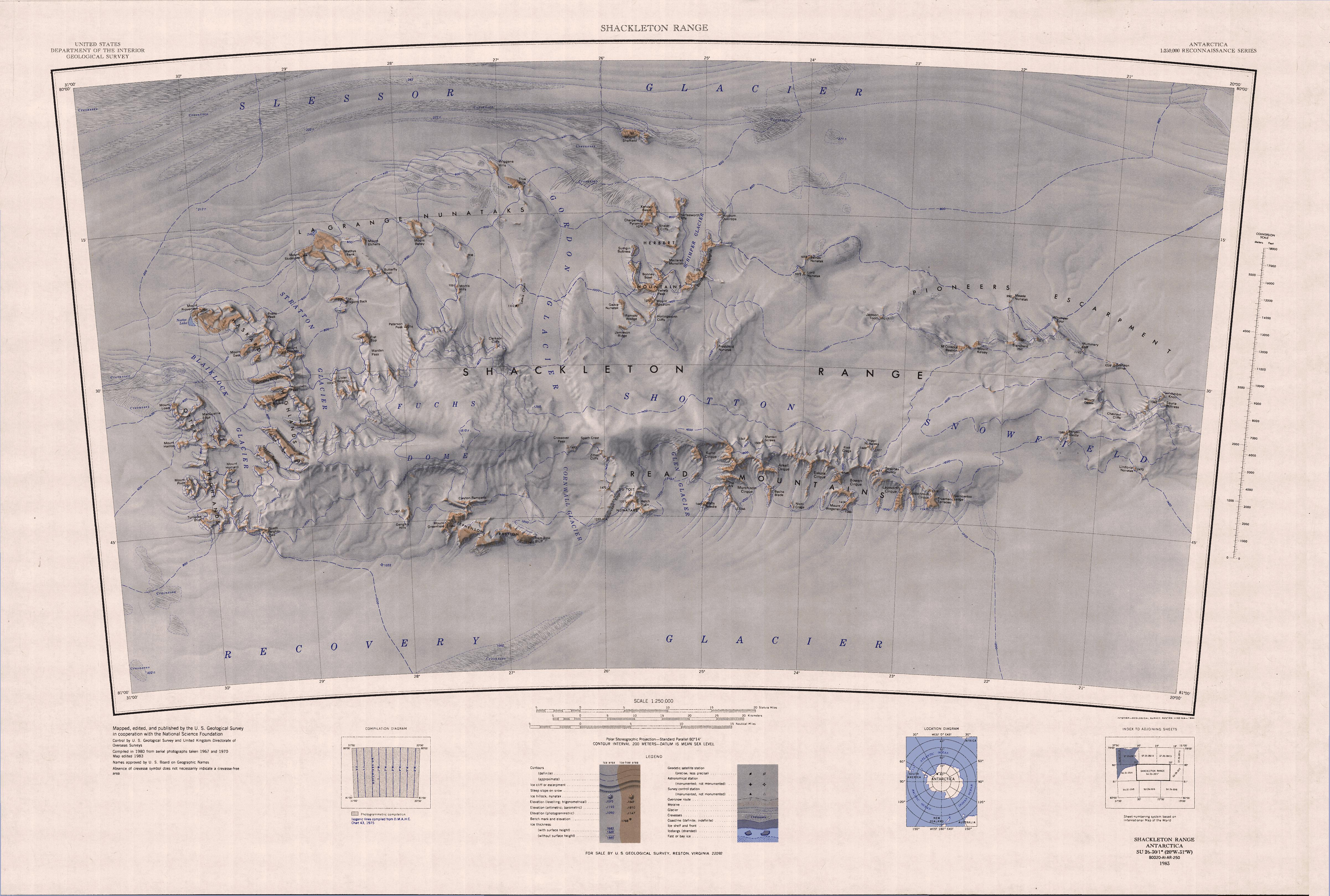
- Shackleton Range. La Grange Nunataks in the northeast (top left)

Geography
- Location within Antarctica
- Range coordinates: 80°18′S 27°50′W

La Grange Nunataks (80°18′S 27°50′W) is a scattered group of nunataks extending west for 22 nautical miles (41 km) from the mouth of Gordon Glacier, on the north side of the Shackleton Range, Antarctica. They were first mapped in 1957 by the Commonwealth Trans-Antarctic Expedition (CTAE) and were photographed in 1967 by U.S. Navy aircraft. They were named by the UK Antarctic Place-Names Committee for Johannes J. La Grange, a South African meteorologist with the CTAE. Note: Beney Nunataks.

== Features ==
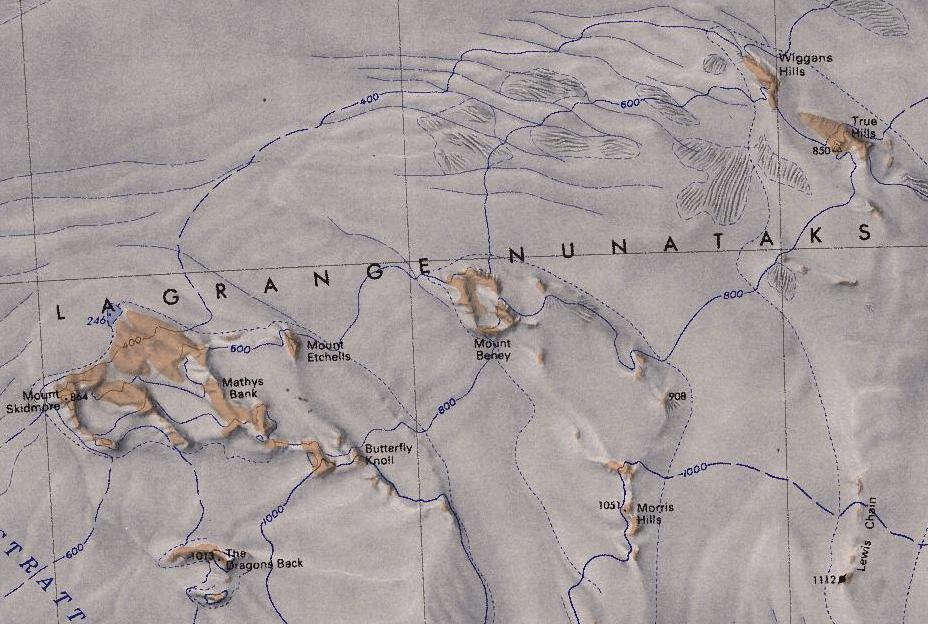
La Grange Nunataks

Named geographical features on the 1983 United States Geological Survey map include:

=== Butterfly Knoll ===
80°20′S 28°09′W. One of the La Grange Nunataks located 4.5 miles (7.2 km) southwest of Mount Beney in the Shackleton Range. Photographed from the air by the U.S. Navy, 1967, and surveyed by BAS, 1968-71. Named by the UK-APC from its resemblance in plain view to a butterfly.

=== Mathys Bank ===
80°19′S 28°30′W. A rock ridge rising to c. 750 metres (2,460 ft), located 2.5 miles (4.0 km) southwest of Mount Etchells in La Grange Nunataks, Shackleton Range. Photographed from the air by the U.S. Navy, 1967, and surveyed by BAS, 1968-71. Named by the UK-APC after Nicholas Mathys, BAS general assistant, Halley Station, 1967-69, who worked in Shackleton Range, 1968-69.

=== Morris Hills ===
80°23′S 27°27′W. Scattered group of hills 6 miles (9.7 km) northeast of Petersen Peak, in the La Grange Nunataks of north-central Shackleton Range. First mapped in 1957 by the CTAE; photographed in 1967 by U.S. Navy (trimetrogon aerial photography). Named by UK-APC for Leslie F. Morris, member of the Royal Society IGY Expedition at Brunt Ice Shelf, who in 1957 spent several weeks helping with the final preparations for the CTAE transpolar journey. Not: Morris Nunataks.

=== Mount Beney ===
80°16′S 27°45′W. The largest of the La Grange Nunataks, rising to 1,000 metres (3,300 ft) in the north part of Shackleton Range. Roughly mapped by CTAE in 1957; photographed from the air by USN in 1967 and surveyed by BAS, 1968-71. Named by UK-APC for Sgt. Ivor C. Beney, RE, member of the Royal Society IGY Expedition at Shackleton station in 1957, who assisted with preparations for the CTAE, 1955–58.

=== Mount Etchells ===
80°17′S 28°20′W. One of the La Grange Nunataks in the Shackleton Range, rising to c. 900 metres (3,000 ft) to the west of Mount Beney. Photographed from the air by the U.S. Navy, 1967, and surveyed by BAS, 1968-71. Named by the UK-APC after William A. Etchells, diesel mechanic and Projects Officer (engineering) with BAS, 1962-88, who worked in Shackleton Range, 1968–69.

=== The Dragons Back ===
80°23′S 28°33′W. A mostly ice-free ridge rising to 1,315 metres (4,314 ft) in the west part of La Grange Nunataks, Shackleton Range. Photographed from the air by the U.S. Navy, 1967, and surveyed by BAS, 1968-71. Descriptively named by the UK-APC, 1971, from the spikes on the ridge crest giving an allusion of a dragon.

=== True Hills ===
80°12′S 26°51′W. Rock hills 1 mile (1.6 km) southeast of Wiggans Hills, rising to 850 metres (2,790 ft) and marking the northeast end of La Grange Nunataks, Shackleton Range. Photographed from the air by the U.S. Navy, 1967, and surveyed by BAS, 1968-71. Named by the UK-APC after Anthony True, BAS surveyor, Halley Station, 1968-70, who worked in Shackleton Range.

=== Wiggans Hills ===
80°11′S 27°03′W Exposed rock hills, 2 miles (3.2 km) long, rising to c. 700 metres (2,300 ft) on the west side of the terminus of Gordon Glacier and forming the northernmost feature of La Grange Nunataks, Shackleton Range. Photographed from the air by the U.S. Navy, 1967, and surveyed by BAS, 1968-71. Named by the UK-APC in 1971 for Thomas H. Wiggans, BAS general assistant at Halley Station, 1968-70, who worked in the area during two seasons.

=== Mount Skidmore ===
80°18′S 28°56′W A mountain (865 metres (2,838 ft)) on the east side of the mouth of Stratton Glacier in the Shackleton Range. First mapped in 1957 by the CTAE; photographed in 1967 by U.S. Navy (trimetrogon aerial photography). Named by UK-APC for Michael J. Skidmore, BAS geologist at the Brunt Ice Shelf, 1966-69, who worked in the Shackleton Range, 1968-69. Not: Mount Lagrange.

=== Lewis Chain ===
80°23′S 26°50′W. A chain of four rock nunataks on the west side of Gordon Glacier in the Shackleton Range. First mapped by the CTAE in 1957; photographed by U.S. Navy (trimetrogon aerial photography) in 1967. Named by UK-APC for Squadron Leader John H. Lewis, RAF, senior pilot of the RAF contingent of the CTAE, 1956-58. Not: Mount Lewis.

== Sources ==
- Alberts, Fred G., ed. (1995), Geographic Names of the Antarctic (PDF) (2 ed.), United States Board on Geographic Names This article incorporates public domain material from websites or documents of the United States Board on Geographic Names.
- Shackleton Range, United States Geological Survey, 1983 This article incorporates public domain material from websites or documents of the United States Geological Survey.
