= Adolph Albrecht Erlenmeyer =

German physician and psychiatrist

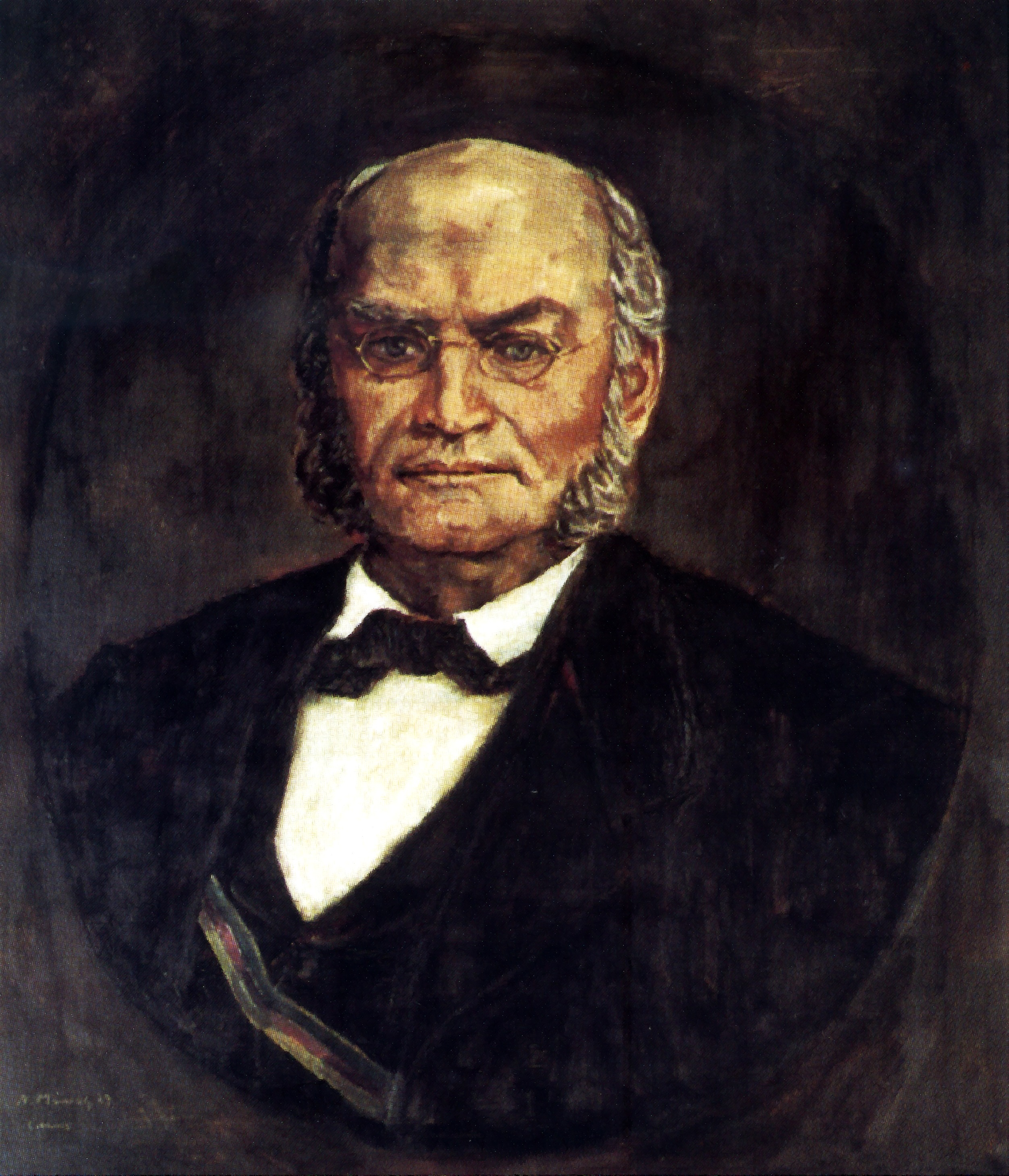
Adolph Albrecht Erlenmeyer

Adolph Albrecht Erlenmeyer (11 July 1822 – 9 August 1877) was a German physician and psychiatrist born in Wiesbaden.

He studied medicine in Marburg, Bonn and Berlin. At the University of Bonn he studied under surgeon Karl Wilhelm Wutzer (1789–1863), and after receiving his doctorate from the University of Berlin, he was an assistant to psychiatrist Carl Wigand Maximilian Jacobi (1777–1858) at the asylum in Siegburg. As a young man, Erlenmeyer was influenced by Jacobi's somatic approach to psychiatry, and felt that there needed to be a close unity of psychiatry and neurology.

In 1848 he opened a private asylum in Bendorf bei Koblenz that was to become known as Asyl für Gehirn- und Nervenkranke. During the ensuing years the facility expanded, eventually having a department of neurology (1866) and an "agricultural colony" called Albrechtshöhe (1867).

In 1854 Erlenmeyer became a co-founder of the Deutsche Gesellschaft für Psychiatrie und gerichtliche Psychologie (German Society for Psychiatry and Forensic Psychology). His son, psychiatrist Friedrich Albrecht Erlenmeyer (1849–1926) is remembered for his research of morphine addiction.

== Published works ==
- Die Gehirnatrophie der Erwachsenen (Brain atrophy in adults) 1852
- Wie sind Seelenstörungen in ihrem Beginne zu behandeln? (How psychic disturbances should be treated in their beginning). 1860; Later translated into several languages.
- Die subcutanen Injectionen der Arzneimittel (Subcutaneous injections) 1866
- Die Embolie der Hirnarierien (Embolism of the cerebral arteries) 1867
- Die luetischen Psychosen (Syphilitic psychoses) 1876.
