= Caspar Max Brosius =

German physician and psychiatrist

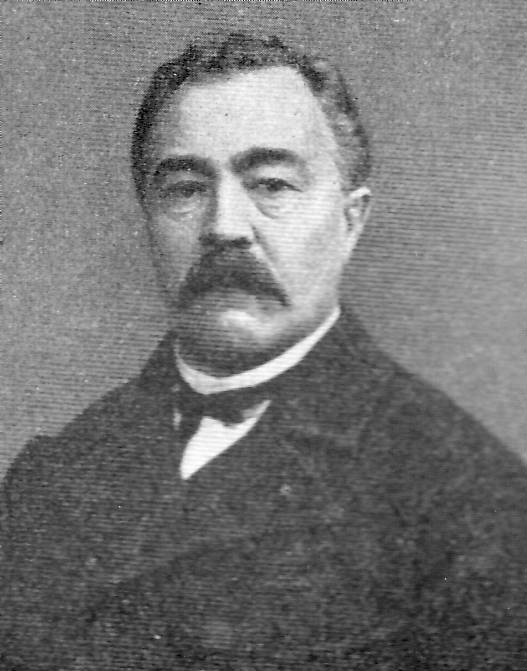
Caspar Max Brosius (1825-1910)

Caspar Maximilian Brosius (12 June 1825 – 17 February 1910) was a German physician and psychiatrist born in Burgsteinfurt, Westphalia.

Son of a parish doctor, Brosius studied medicine at the Universities of Greifswald and Bonn, receiving his doctorate in 1848 with a dissertation titled De hebetudine animi (Über den Stumpfsinn der Seele). Following graduation, he practiced medicine in Burgsteinfurt, and in 1855 started work as an assistant to Adolph Albrecht Erlenmeyer (1822-1877) at the Asyl für Gehirn- und Nervenkranke in Bendorf bei Koblenz.

In 1857 he established a private psychiatric hospital at his homestead in Bendorf, where he created a humanitarian environment for the mentally ill based on a philosophy he called the "familiare system" (family system). In the following decades the facility underwent considerable expansion in size and function. At Bendorf he strove in providing living conditions for the mentally ill that were the equivalent to those of the healthy, non-institutionalized public. He believed that his patients should have a place where they "felt at home", and deemed it necessary to assess and treat them on an individual basis.

In 1859, with Friedrich Koster (1822-1893), he was a contributing editor of the psychiatric journal Der Irrenfreund, becoming its sole editor from 1878. In 1860 he published a translation of John Conolly's "Treatment of the insane without mechanical restraints" as Die Behandlung der Irren ohne mechanischen Zwang.
