= Friedrich Albrecht Erlenmeyer =

German physician and psychiatrist

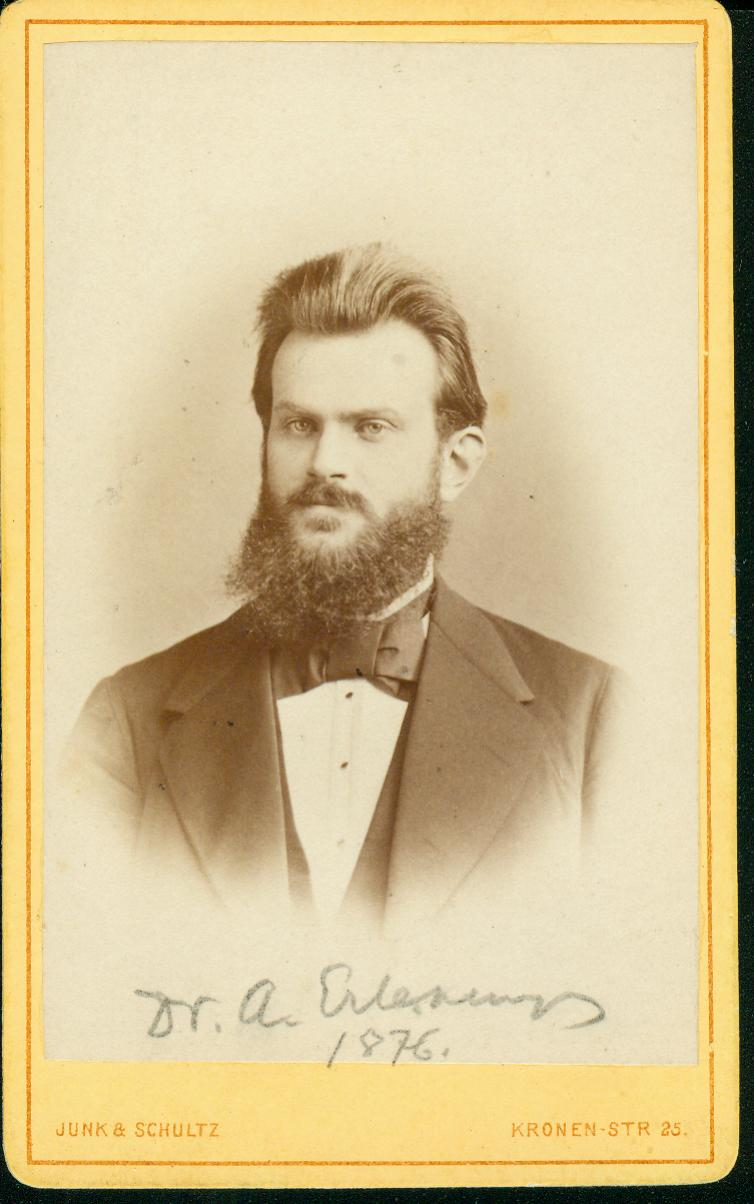
Friedrich Albrecht Erlenmeyer (1876)

Friedrich Albrecht Erlenmeyer (9 March 1849 – 7 July 1926) was a German physician and psychiatrist known for his contributions to the fields of neurology and psychiatry.

== Early life and education ==
Erlenmeyer was born in Bendorf bei Koblenz, the son of psychiatrist Adolph Albrecht Erlenmeyer (1822–1877). He studied medicine at the Universities of Bonn, Halle and Würzburg and Greifswald, earning his doctorate in 1872 at Greifswald with a dissertation titled Uber das cicatricielle Neurom.

== Career ==
Afterwards he became directing physician at his father's asylum for Gemüts- und Nervenkranke at Bendorf.

He published a large number of writings in the fields of neurology and psychiatry, which included articles in foreign publications such as Tuke's "Dictionary of Psychological Medicine", as well as in German works such as Penzoldt-Stintzing's Handbuch der speciellen Therapie innerer Krankheiten.

In 1878, he founded the neurological/psychiatric journal Centralblatt für Nervenheilkunde, Psychiatrie und gerichtliche Psychopathologie. In 1895 with William Thierry Preyer (1841–1897) and Wilhelm Langenbruch (1860-1932), he founded Die Handschrift, Blatter fur wissenschaftliche Schriftkunde und Graphologie, a scientific journal dealing with palaeography and graphology.

In 1887, he described cocaine as the third deadly "plague" for humanity, after alcohol and opium. It follows an article by Sigmund Freud praising this substance as a remedy for morphine addiction.

== Selected writings ==
- Die Schrift; Grundzüge ihrer Physiologie und Pathologie (Stuttgart, 1879) –
- Über statische Reflexkrämpfe (second edition. Leipzig 1885) – "On static reflex spasms.
- Die Principien der Epilepsiebehandlung (Wiesbaden 1886) – The principles of epilepsy treatment.
- Die Morphiumsucht und ihre Behandlung (third edition- Neuwied 1887) – Morphine addiction and treatment.
- Unser Irrenwesen, Studien und Vorschläge zu seiner Reorganisation (Wiesbaden 1896) – Our asylum system, studies and proposals for its reorganization.
- Die Entmündigung wegen Trunksucht nach dem B. G. B. (Koblenz 1899).
  - Publications by Erlenmeyer that have been translated into English:
- "On the treatment of the morphine habit", translated from German by George S. Davis, 1889.
