= West London NHS Trust =

NHS mental health trust in England

- Type: NHS trust
- Established: 1 October 2000
- Headquarters: 1 Armstrong Way; Southall; UB2 4SD
- Hospitals: Broadmoor Hospital; Cassel Hospital; St Bernard's Hospital
- Staff: 3,892 (2018/19)
- Website: www.westlondon.nhs.uk

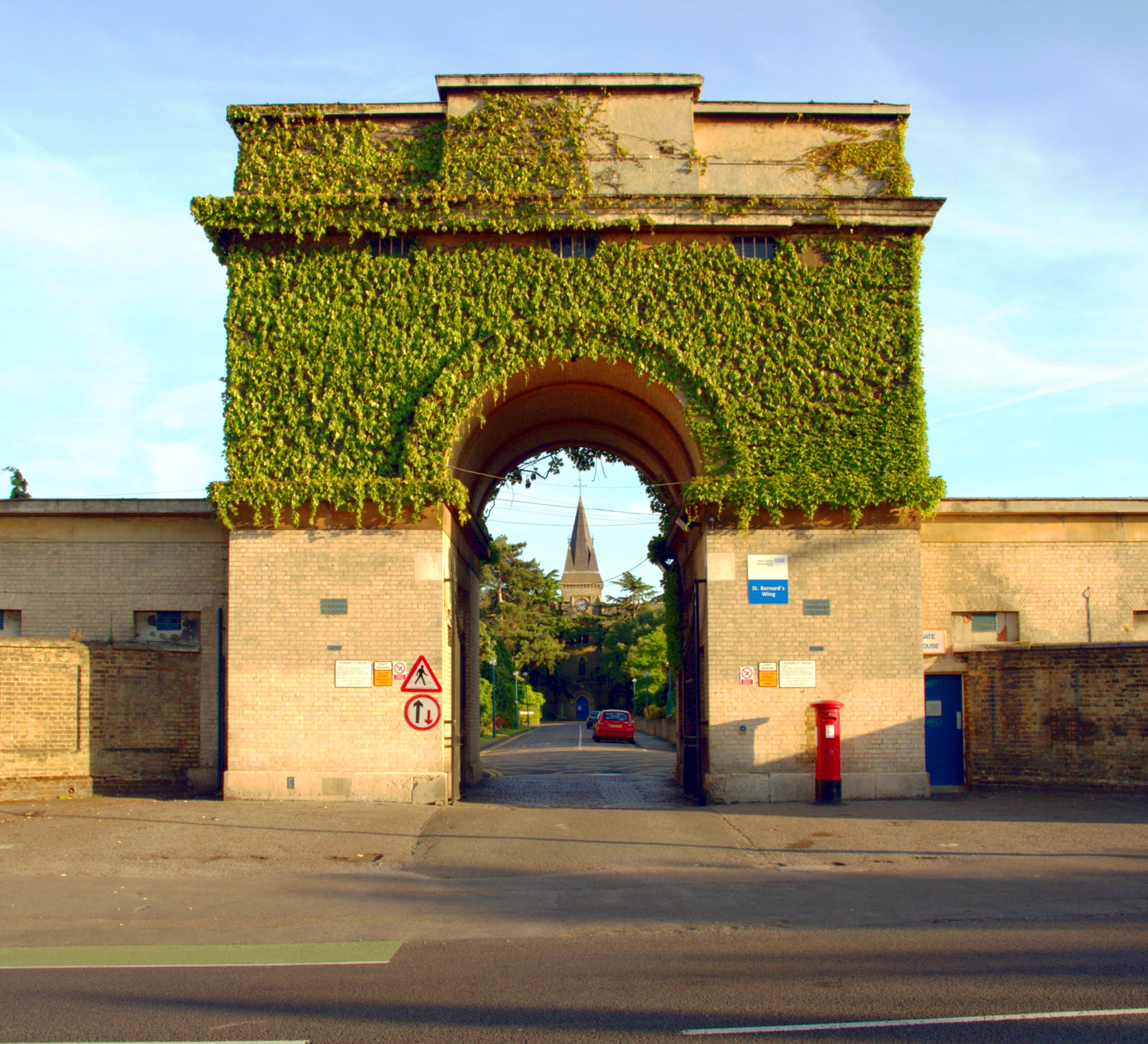
West London NHS Trust

West London NHS Trust is an NHS trust which provides mental and physical health services to the London boroughs of Ealing, Hammersmith and Fulham and Hounslow. It also provides some services on a national basis, including forensic and high-security services.

The trust operates across several sites, including Broadmoor Hospital in Crowthorne and St Bernard's Hospital in Hanwell.

== History ==
The trust was established as the West London Mental Health NHS Trust on 1 October 2000, and took its current name on 31 August 2018.

- Middlesex County Asylum, Hanwell (1831–1889)
- London County Asylum, Hanwell (1889–1917)
- London County Mental Hospital (1918–1928)
- Hanwell Mental Hospital (1929–1937)
- St Bernard's Hospital (1938–1980)
- Psychiatric Unit (1980–1992) – part of a re-organised complex of divisions on same site and called Ealing General Hospital with a central corporate body.
- "The West London Healthcare National Health Service Trust (Establishment) Order 1992". West London Mental Healthcare (NHS) Trust. (1992–1999) See: Statutory Instrument 1992 No. 2539.
- Ealing, Hammersmith & Fulham Mental Health (NHS) Trust (1999–2001)
- West London Mental Health NHS Trust (2001–24 September 2018)
- West London NHS Trust (25 September 2018 – present)

Some of the trust's services based at St Bernard's Hospital, Hanwell.

Here the first superintendent Dr (later Sir) William & Mrs Mildred Ellis who were so much impressed with Moral therapy and humane treatment they saw offered to people suffering Mental disorders at the Quaker Asylum in York that they both imposed these methods on the staff at Hanwell. This was as such the very first large scale experiment. The second superintendent brought mechanical restraints – as a form of treatment – back. The third superintendent Dr John Conolly against stiff opposition backed up with much vitriol, took the example further, and did away with all mechanical restraints. He found, like the Ellises before, that bedlam diminished, behaviour became less defensive and cooperation improved dramatically, and many recovered or much improved. This event added to his other pioneering work such as developing proper diets and conditions for his patients and battles to set up regular training lecture specialising in mental health, for doctor training, all led to him receiving worldwide recognition.

Broadmoor high secure hospital: In order to end the isolation suffered by the high secure services from the rest of the NHS, the Health Act 1999 was passed, allowing NHS Trusts to provide for these. After a three-month consultation in the early part of the following year it was agreed that the high secure services based at Broadmoor Hospital and those provided by the Ealing, Hammersmith and Fulham Mental Health NHS Trust should be combined into one organisation. This created the West London Mental Health NHS Trust, which took over governance in 2001; the Trust then changed its name to West London NHS Trust on 25 September 2018.

== Local services division ==
- Cassel Hospital
- Charing Cross
- Lakeside
- St Bernard's site
- The Limes

It won a contract for community services in Ealing for 10 years from May 2019, leading a partnership with Central and North West London NHS Foundation Trust and Hillingdon Hospitals NHS Foundation Trust.

== Forensic services division ==
In November 2004 a new directorate, the Woman's Secure Services was created. This was to separate the medium secure women's facilities from Broadmoor Hospital and relocate them on the Ealing site.

- The Paddock Centre (70 beds) – Dangerous Severe Personality Disorder and Broadmoor Hospital (300 bed) – male High Secure Service are at Crowthorne in Berkshire.
- The Orchard (60 bed) – (female Enhanced Medium Secure and Low Secure services), Three Bridges Unit (male Medium Secure services), The Tony Hillis Wing – (male Medium and Low Secure services) and The Wells Unit (Forensic Child and Adolescent Mental Health service) are all at the Ealing site.

== Clinical service units and service lines ==
In 2014 the trust restructured so that it now delivers services from two clinical service units - High secure and forensic services, and local and specialist services. It has eight service lines - high secure services at Broadmoor Hospital, the West London Forensic Service, integrated care services (community health services), liaison and long-term conditions (integrated mental health services), access and urgent mental health care, primary and planned mental health care, cognitive impairment and dementia, Child and Adolescent Mental Health Services (CAMHS) and developmental services.

== Geographical spread ==
West London NHS Trust either runs or provides services at the following sites:

1. Avenue House 43–47 Avenue Road W3 8NJ
2. Alexandria Road: Ealing IAPT, 14A Alexandria Road, W13 0NR
3. Hounslow Recovery Team East: 729 London Road, Hounslow, TW3 1SE
4. Broadmoor Hospital Crowthorne, Berkshire RG45 7EG
5. Cassel Hospital: 1 Ham Common, Richmond, TW10 7JF
6. Cardinal Centre (Feltham CMHT): Cardinal Road, Feltham, TW13 5AL
7. Charing Cross Hospital: Fulham Palace Road, London, W6 8RF
8. Cherington House: Cherington Road, Hanwell, W7 3HL
9. Claybrook Road (Charing Cross Annex) Claybrook Road, London, W6
10. Elm Lodge 4a Marley Close, Greenford, London UB6 9UG
11. Glenthorne Road CAMHS: WLMHT Child, Adolescent and Family Service. 48 Glenthorne Road, Hammersmith W6 0LS
12. Gloucester House 194 Hammersmith Road, London, W6 8BS
13. Hammersmith & Fulham Mental Health Unit (Charing Cross Hospital site) Fulham Palace Road, London W6 8NF
14. Heart of Hounslow Centre for Health 92 Bath Road, Hounslow TW3 3EL
15. Lakeside Mental Health Unit West Middlesex University Hospital, Twickenham Road, Isleworth, TW7 6AF
16. Limes Merrick Road, Southall, UB2 4AU
17. Martin House 1 Swift Road, Southall, Middlesex UB2 4RP
18. Old Oak Road 16/18 Old Oak Road, London, W3 7HO
19. Orchard Women's Service (St Bernard's Hospital site) Uxbridge Road, Southall UB1 3EU
20. Paddock Centre (Broadmoor Hospital site) Crowthorne, Berkshire RG45 7EG
21. Richford Gate Richford Street, London, W6 7HY
22. Solace Centre 58 Bowmans Close, London W13 9YT
23. Stamford Brook Centre 206 Goldhawk Road, London W12 9PA
24. St Vincent Centre 49 Queen Caroline Street, London W6 9QH
25. St Bernard's Hospital Uxbridge Road, Southall UB1 3EU
26. Sycamore Lodge 1 Edgecote Close, Acton, London W3 8PH
27. Three Bridges Medium Secure Unit (St Bernard's Hospital site) Uxbridge Road, Southall UB1 3EU
28. Tony Hillis Wing Mens Low Secure service (St Bernard's Hospital site) Uxbridge Road, Southall UB1 3EU
29. Uxbridge Road Ealing IAPT, 84 Uxbridge Road, W13 8RA

== Corsellis Collection ==
West London NHS Trust was previously the guardian of the Corsellis Collection, containing some nine thousand specimens of brains dating back to the 1950s. The Corsellis collection was originally housed at Runwell Hospital until the 1990s when a major reprovision programme was envisioned; the collection was started at Runwell Hospital by Dr John Corsellis. No larger depository of this speciality is known.

== See also ==
- Healthcare in London
- List of NHS trusts
