= Engelbert Krauskopf =

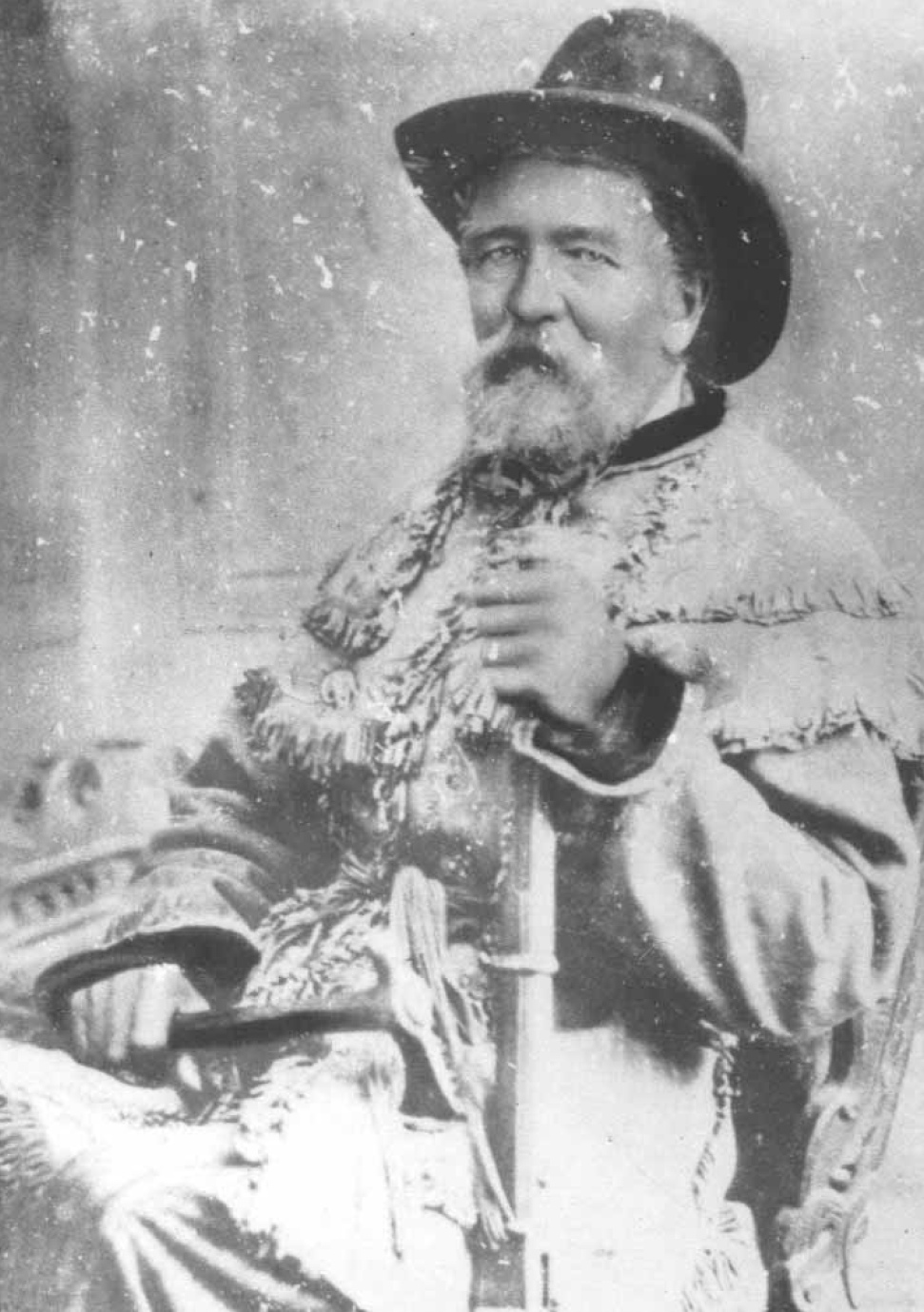
Engelbert Krauskopf

Engelbert Krauskopf (August 21, 1820 – July 11, 1881) was a German-American settler, gunsmith, and naturalist. Born in Bendorf, Germany, he emigrated to the United States in 1846, and became a settler of Fredericksburg, Texas. He was trained as a cabinetmaker and gunsmith, and during the American Civil War once made a gun barrel especially for Robert E. Lee. He was also an inventor: when ammunition became scarce during the Civil War he and silversmith Adolph Lungkwitz developed a process for the manufacture of gun-caps. In 1872, he patented an improvement to a throttle valve stand with John M. Company, and one of his last inventions was a microscope in the form of a magic lantern. An amateur botanist, he described the species Hesperaloe engelmannii (commonly known as Engelmann's red yucca). The standard author abbreviation Krauskopf is used to indicate this person as the author when citing a botanical name.
