= St Bernard's Hospital, Hanwell =

Psychiatric hospital in London, England

St Bernard's Hospital
- West London NHS Trust
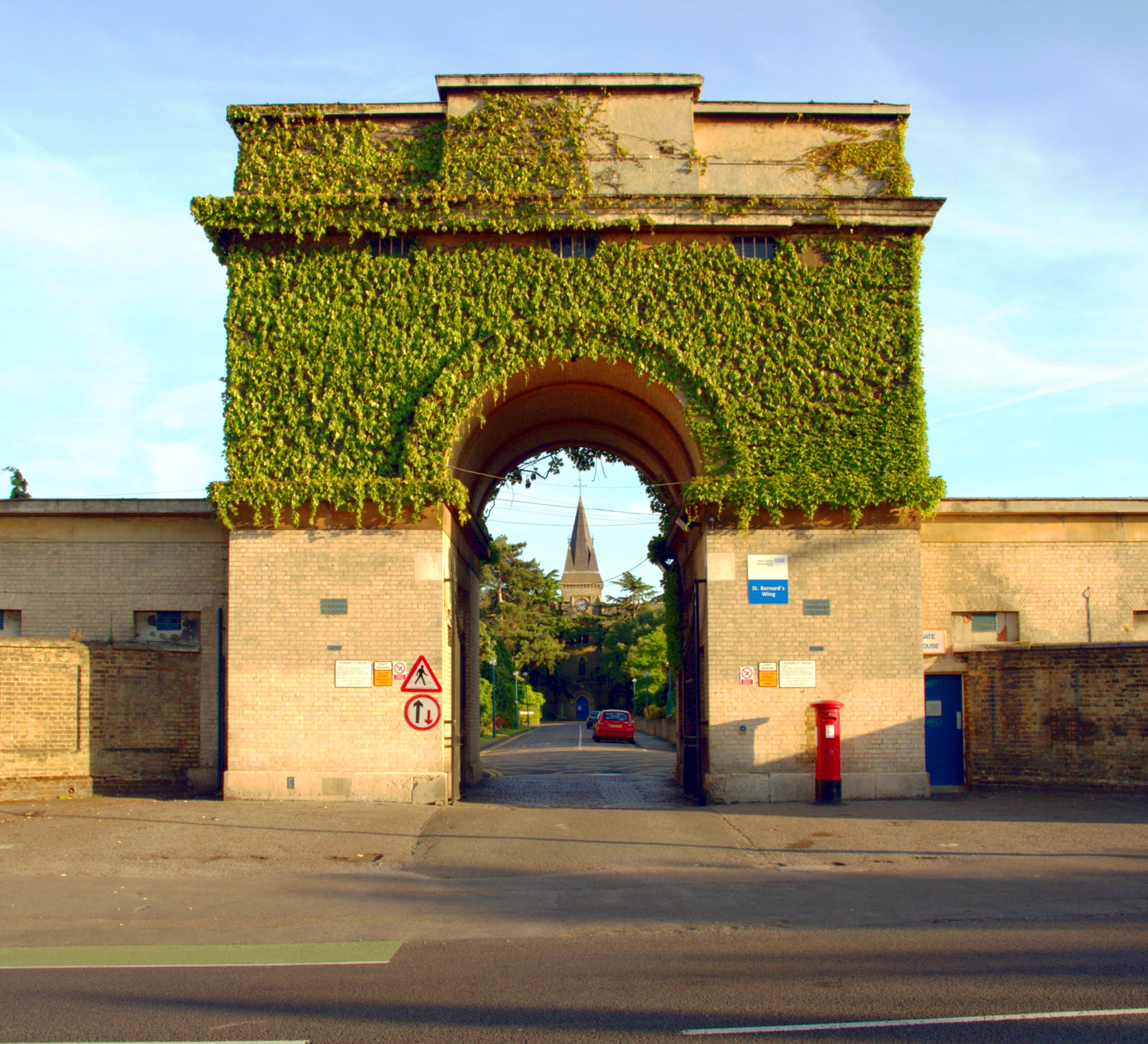
- The gatehouse to the hospital

- Location within Ealing

Geography
- Location: Southall, London, England
- Coordinates: 51.50644°N 0.35160°W

Organisation
- Care system: NHS England
- Type: Psychiatric

Services
- Emergency department: No

History
- Founded: 1831

Links
- Website: www.westlondon.nhs.uk
- Lists: Hospitals in England

St Bernard's Hospital, also known as Hanwell Insane Asylum and the Hanwell Pauper and Lunatic Asylum, was an asylum built for the pauper insane, opening as the First Middlesex County Asylum in 1831. Some of the original buildings are now part of the headquarters for the West London Mental Health NHS Trust (WLMHT).

Its first superintendent, Dr William Charles Ellis, was known in his lifetime for his pioneering work and his adherence to his "great principle of therapeutic employment". Sceptical contemporaries were amazed that such therapy speeded recovery at Hanwell. This greatly pleased the visiting Justices of the Peace as it reduced the long-term cost of keeping each patient. Under the third superintendent John Conolly the institution became famous as the first large asylum to dispense with all mechanical restraints.

The asylum is next to the village of Hanwell but parochially was in Southall (officially in the 1830s the northern precinct (chapelry) of Norwood). It is about 8 miles or 13 km west of Central London and 6 miles (10 km) south-east of Uxbridge.

The building lies on a gently sloping river gravel terrace, a common feature of the Thames Valley. The land immediately to the east was further eroded by the River Brent, which flows along its eastern perimeter. At its southern boundary is the Grand Union Canal and a flight of six locks. Both the southern wall of the old asylum and the flight of locks have been designated a scheduled monument.

== History ==
=== Foundation ===
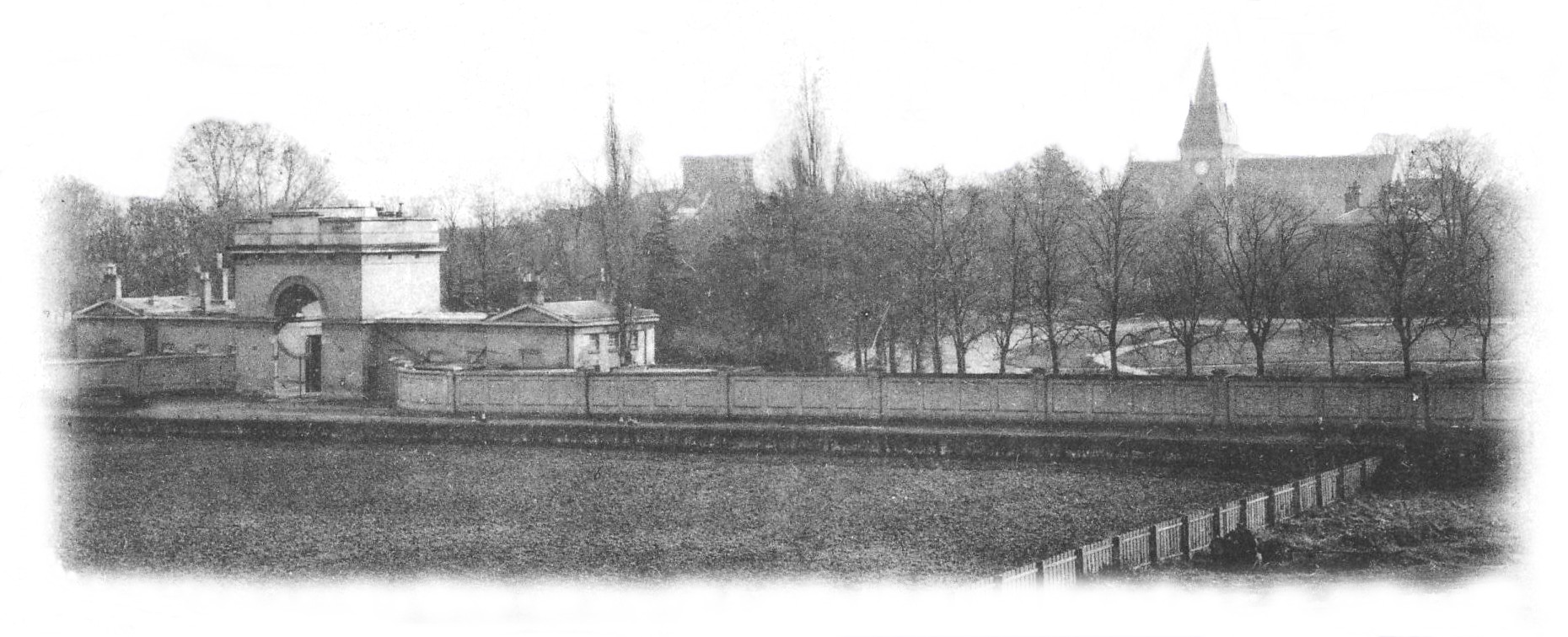
London County Asylum at Hanwell

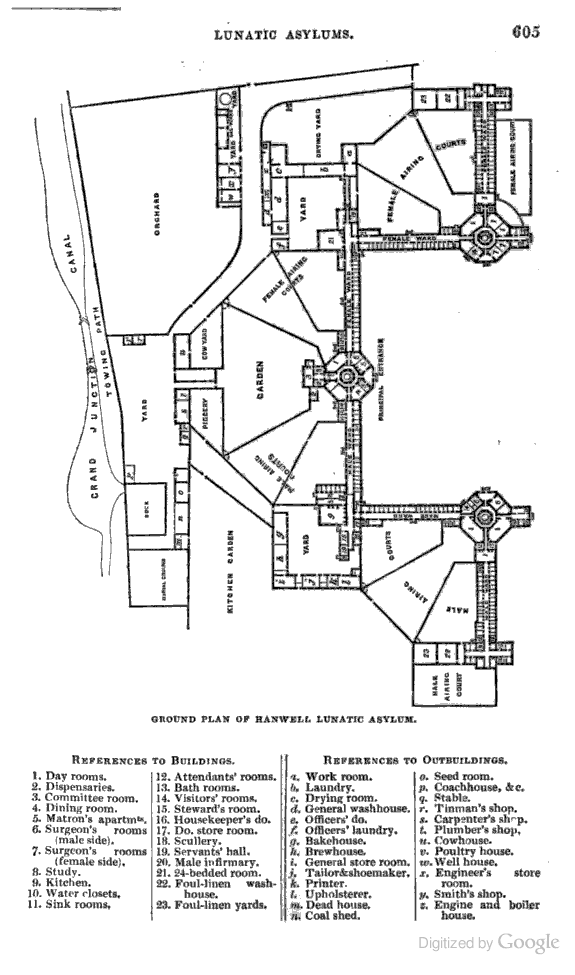
The layout of the asylum c.1850

Several acts of Parliament enabled the building of the asylum, and statutes have driven the subsequent changes in mental health care. The background to the creation of the asylum included the County Asylums Act 1808 which was passed after an expensive war against France. This recognised lunatics as being ill, as being held in the wrong institutions and perhaps having a chance to recover if given the right type of treatment. Non-recovery would mean that the insane pauper would always need to be looked after, which would cost more in the long run. Some parishes were growing in population due to industrialisation, and the existing charitable institutions and workhouses could not cope with the increasing demand. The recognition of insanity as an illness with a possibility of recovery can perhaps be seen as a cost-saving measure as well as a humane one.

"Whereas the practice of confining such lunatics and other insane persons as are chargeable to their respective parishes in Gaols, Houses of Correction, Poor Houses and Houses of Industry, is highly dangerous and inconvenient"

The County Asylums Act 1808 was passed to empower county justices of the peace (JPs) to construct asylums financed out of the local rates, which proved very unpopular. As JPs faced annual re-election, they often met resistance to this policy. The cost of keeping lunatics in jails and workhouses had previously been charged to their parish of birth, and continued indefinitely as there was no attempt to cure them. To make matters worse, the Corn Laws kept food prices high while the Hanwell Inclosure Act 1813 53 Geo. 3. c. 6 Pr.) removed the right of poor people to use the common lands to support themselves, causing added mental distress to the already impoverished.

Concern grew about the disproportionate number of lunatics in Middlesex. The local judiciary (before whom the lunatics would have appeared charged with various offences or running amok) decided on 15 November 1827 to exercise their powers and build an asylum. In the following year Parliament recognised the barriers to asylum building (mostly financial) and passed the Metropolitan Commissioners in Lunacy Act 1828 to ensure the County Asylums Act 1808 was implemented.

Work on the new asylum at Hanwell started in 1829. Most of the land – 44 acres (180,000 m^{2}) – was purchased from the Earl of Jersey. The building contractor was William Cubitt, who completed the work to a tight budget of £64,000. The architect was William Alderson. His neo-classical design consisted of a central octagonal 'panopticon' tower with a basement and two other floors. The windows are tall with semicircular bonded gauge brick arches at the top. There were two wings of one basement and just one other floor in the form of a west–east corridor. Both wings turn north, and each terminates at its own panopticon tower, which again has a basement and two floors; the overall building forms three sides of a square. The east side of the central tower was intended for the male patients and the west for the females. With germ theory beginning to be developed around this time, spreading the wards out in this manner was thought to help reduce the spread of infections.

The design also reduced the need to build corridors and saved money. The wards themselves were long and thin with a corridor from one part of the asylum to another running through the ward itself. From the air the design is roughly symmetrical with services: kitchens; laundry; management; chapel and hall (used for parties, theatre and dances) all located in the middle with wards laid out to each side, male to the left of the entrance and female to the right.

Hanwell became a model for future hospitals and was copied and modified by the designers of countless other asylums across England and Wales (for example Horton, Colney Hatch, Claybury, or Springfield)— the main alternative design being the villa plan, as at Chalfont or Shenley.

But there is something at Hanwell more precious than any of these. As a traveller by the Great Western Railway dashes through it, his attention is arrested for a moment by a large building on the southern side of the railway, a plain but handsome structure, which stands cheerfully in an open country, and discloses even to the hasty glimpse of the traveller, as he hurries past, evident indications of careful and attentive management. It is the LUNATIC ASYLUM for the county of Middlesex, one of the most interesting buildings in the kingdom; a temple sacred to benevolence, a monument and memorial of the philanthropy of our times.

— Urban, Sylvanus (July-December 1858). The Gentleman's Magazine, John Bower Nichols & Son, London. 34 p.294, 2nd col.

The central tower was adorned with a monumental clock procured from John Moore & Sons of 38–9 Clerkenwell Close, London. This was later moved to the Chapel tower when the chapel was built. In November 1829 building work started again on the first extension, and there were further expansions in 1879.

The building was designed as a functional work space and home for the treatment of insane paupers, rather than a residence or civic building. This unfortunately led to poor ventilation, and together with overcrowding may have been the cause of tuberculosis. The main view most people see of the hospital is the elegantly proportioned gatehouse entrance which adjoins the Uxbridge Road. It takes the form of a neoclassical half-circular arch, large and solid, over tall vertical barred, iron gates, which incorporate a small pedestrian gate with its own key lock. On the north side of the building there is a blue Ordnance Survey Bench Mark. This point was measured to be 69.279 feet (21.116 m) above mean sea level.

=== The Victorian era ===
The asylum opened on 16 May 1831 under the administration of the local Committee of Visiting Justices of Middlesex County Council. The first superintendent was Dr William Charles Ellis, who in 1817 had been appointed superintendent to the newly purpose-built West Riding Pauper Lunatic Asylum at Wakefield. His wife, Mildred Ellis, held the post of matron at Hanwell (as she had at Wakefield) from the opening in 1831 until William Ellis' resignation in 1838.

It was found essential for recovery that the patients should get out into full daylight for fresh air and exercise, so the ground floor wards had 'airing courts' which were shared by the other wards upstairs. These were pleasantly laid out areas with seating and bounded by walls or railings. Some patients, well into their recovery, were allowed to walk and work in the surrounding fields. The asylum had its own carpentry, bakery and brewery along with many other services and was as self-sufficient as possible. The asylum paid the canal company for taking water from the canal and had its own dock to receive barges. This was very convenient for receiving coal deliveries, which was used not only for heating but for producing gas for lighting.

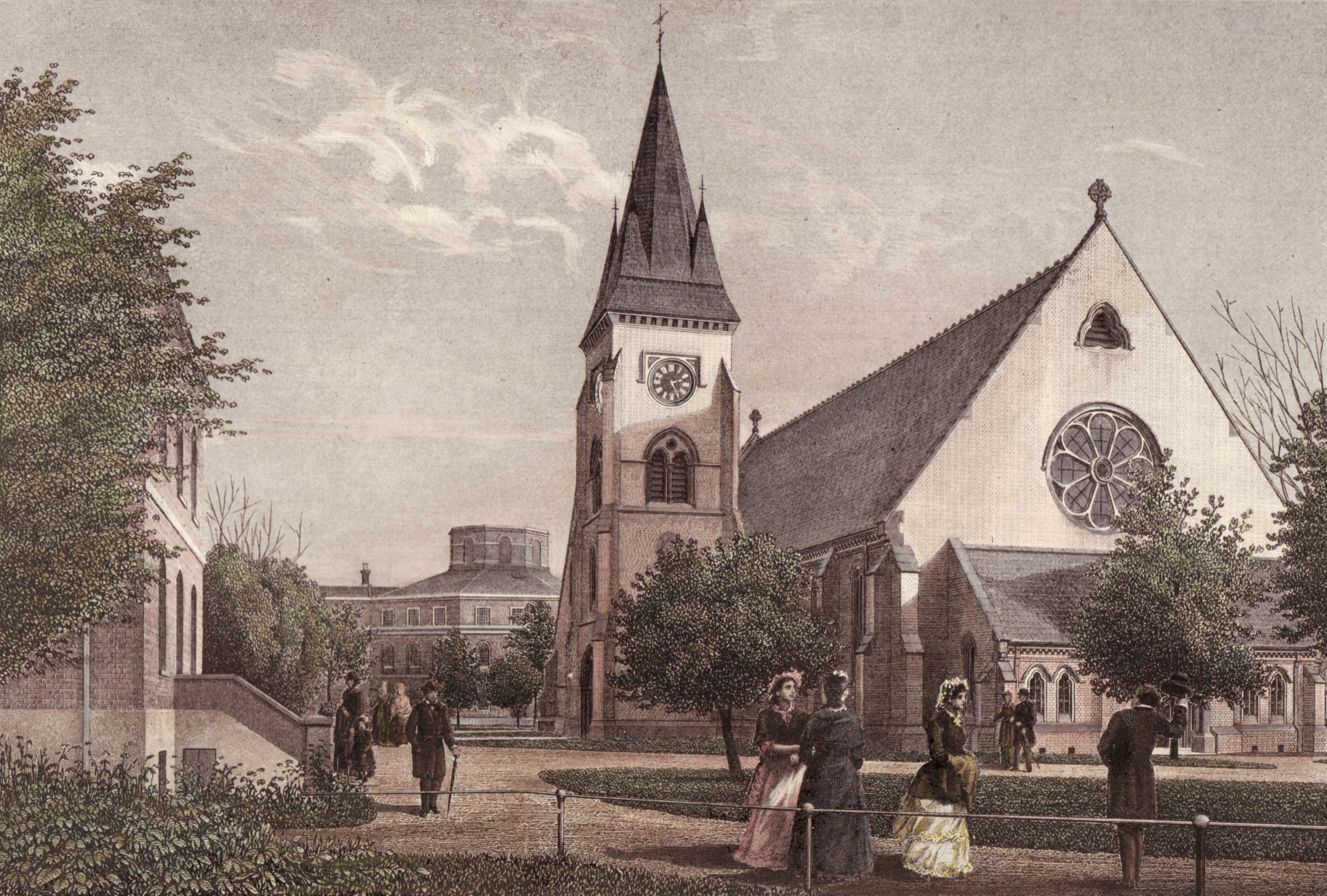
Hanwell Asylum, The chapel – c.1875

Originally planned to house 450 patients, with space for a further 150, its capacity was reduced back to 300, with space for another 150. This was due to fears of an outcry if the local tax rate increased too sharply. At first the number of paupers admitted was low due to the charge of nine shilling per week each, this being higher than the workhouses and jails, but by force of the law the asylum was full within six months and more space was badly needed. In November of the same year, work on building extensions began to address this problem, and so started the almost continuous process of rebuilding and improvements that go on in the present day.

The friends or relatives of a deceased patient were free to remove the remains for burial. Failing this, the deceased were interred in unmarked paupers' graves in the hospital's burial ground. With the Anatomy Act 1832, the body was first kept in a building called the 'dead house', on the west side of the burial ground (see diagram above). If unclaimed after 72 hours it could be sold to a licensed anatomy school. The act also provided for the donation of bodies. As autopsies on paupers did not require the coroner's permission, autopsies became common at the hospital. From 1845 the results of these autopsies were recorded in detail by Dr Hitchman.

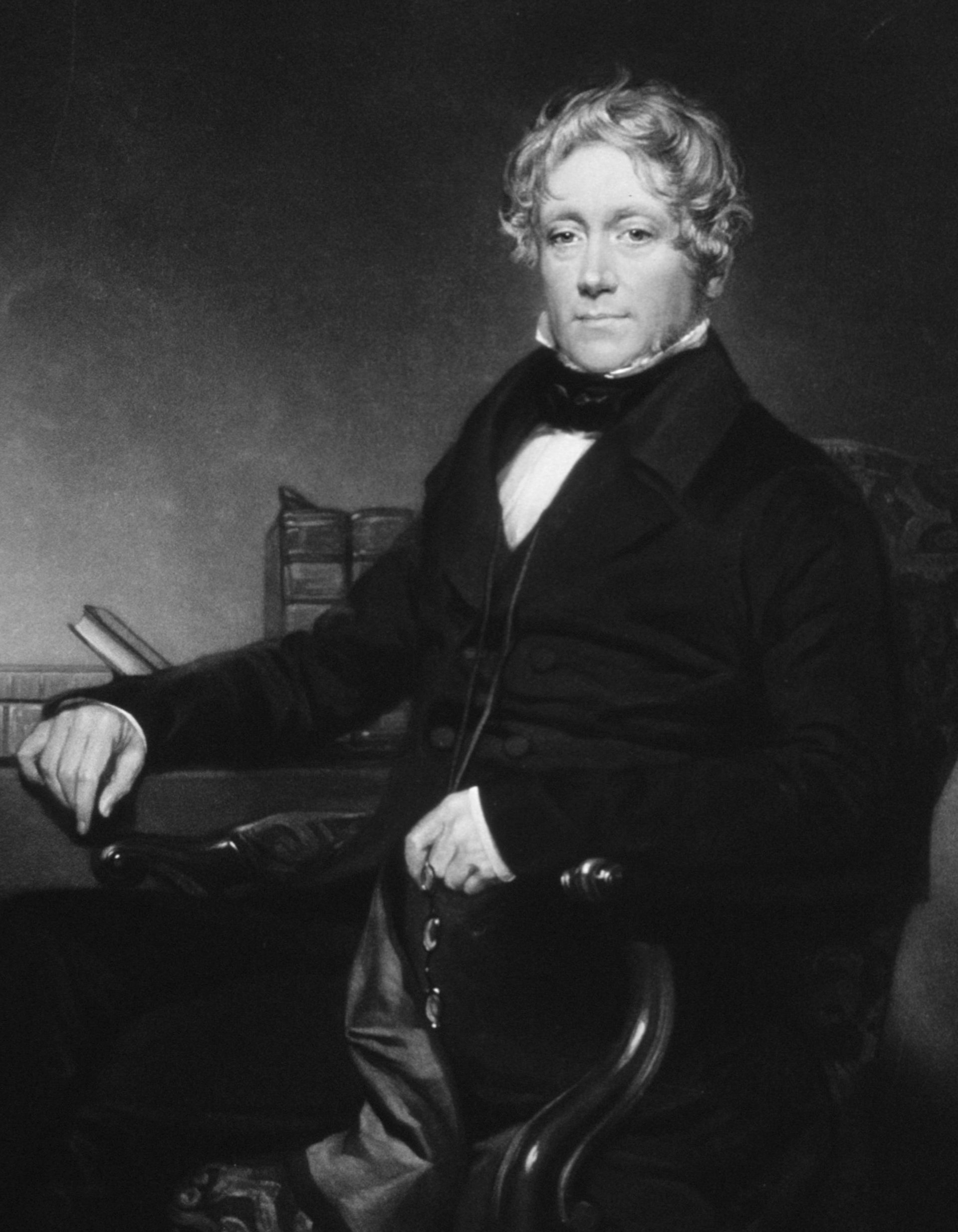
John Conolly MD DCL (1794–1866)

John Conolly took up residence as the third superintendent on 1 June 1839. In April 1839, Serjeant-at-law John Adams, one of the Visiting Justices of the asylum and a founding member and first chairman of Legal & General, suggested that Conolly visit the Lincoln Asylum and see the system operated by Robert Gardiner Hill. He was so impressed by this that he decided to abolish mechanical restraints at Hanwell. This must have taken enormous powers of persuasion: the existing staff would have to change their work practices and learn how to nurse more effectively those patients with troubling behaviour. However, the reform seemed to avoid the patient suffering further trauma as a result of restraint and being made to feel completely helpless. Conolly succeeded in introducing the reform by 21 September 1839, less than 3 months after he took charge. This is perhaps a testament to the earlier work of Ellis.

Something of Connolly's success can be gauged from this extract from the first page of the 68th report of the Visiting Justices:

The Visiting Justices have the satisfaction to find that every year, as the excellence of the non - restraint System becomes more generally recognized, affords fewer Materials in the Asylum for Comment or Report. For four years it has been the settled Rule of the House, that no harshness nor coercive cruelly should be used in any case, but that every Patient, however violent, should be treated with uniform kindness and forbearance; and during that time such has been the undeviating success of this Plan, such has been the even tenor of it course, that it now presents no new fact nor features either to vindicate or explain. This is the more extraordinary, as it rarely happens that a Theory can be brought into Practice without losing a Portion of its presumed Efficiency.

— Charles Augustus Tulk, The Sixty-eighth Report of the Visiting Justices appointed to superintend the management of The County Lunatic Asylum at Hanwell, 26 October 1843

Conolly described the therapy in his book The Treatment of the Insane without Mechanical Restraints.

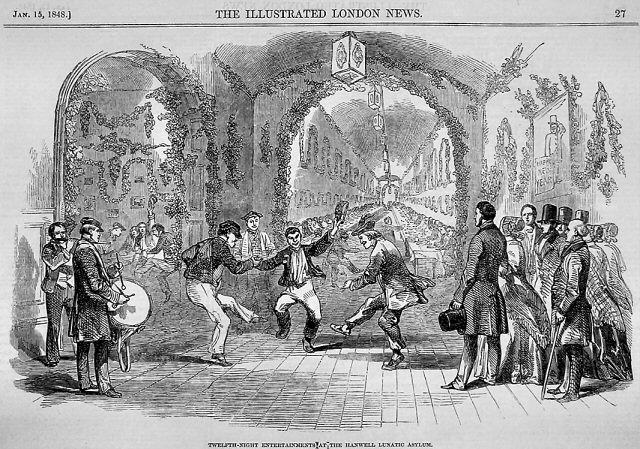
Twelfth Night at the Hanwell Asylum.

A full-page illustration and short article was published in The Illustrated London News on 15 January 1848 about how Twelfth Night was celebrated at the Hanwell Asylum.

By the Inebriates Act 1888 (51 & 52 Vict. c. 19), the earlier Habitual Drunkard Act 1879 (42 & 43 Vict. c. 19) was made permanent (and the term 'habitual drunkard' changed to 'inebriate'). As Hanwell would take in such patients for up to a year, this Act was seen as a reason to close the brewery. With the term "London County" being introduced for the greater London area, the asylum was renamed the London County Asylum in 1889.

=== Early 20th century ===
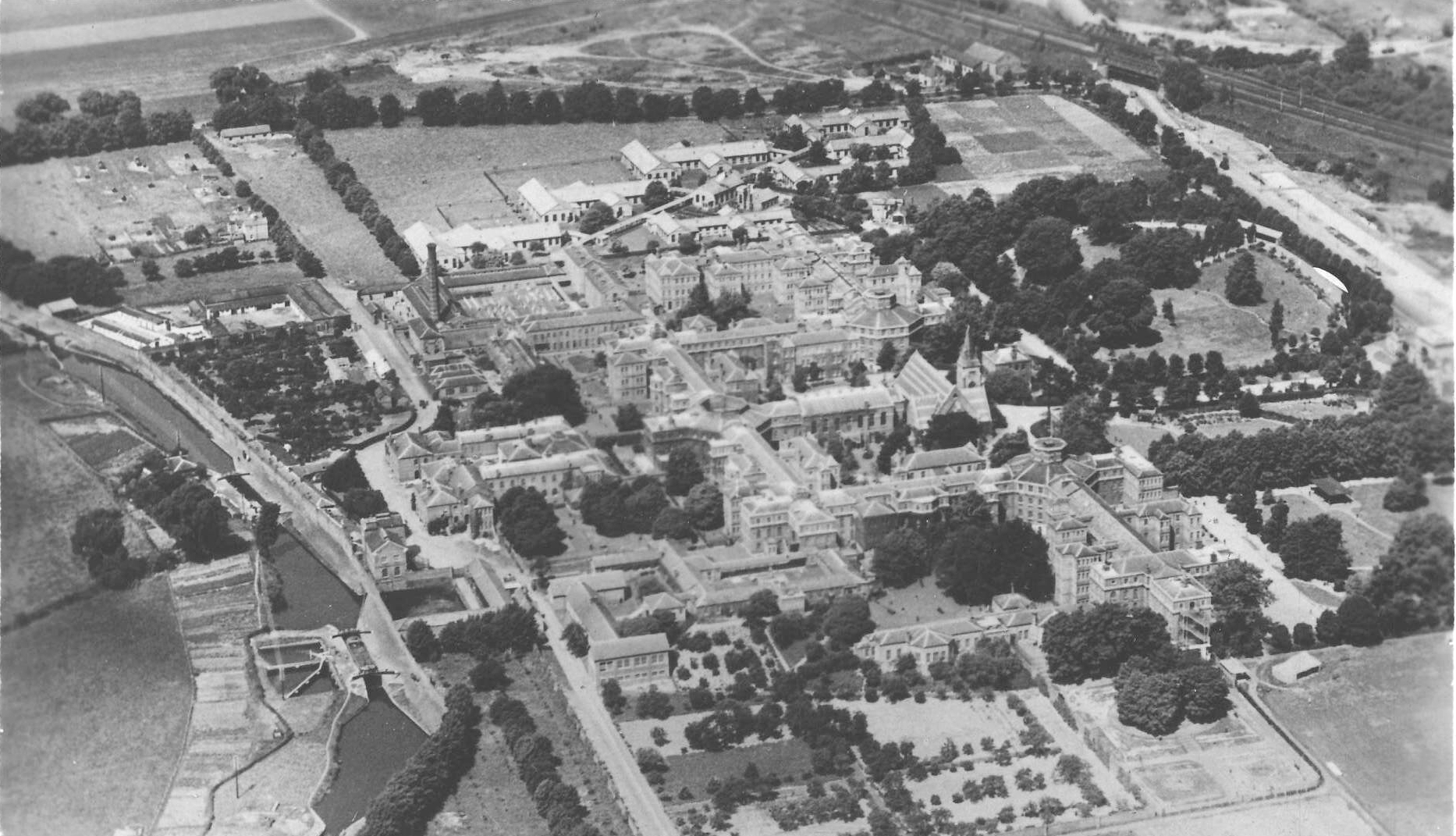
Aerial view of the hospital c.1920

On 11 June 1910, nurse Hilda Elizabeth Wolsey followed a female patient who climbed one of the fire escapes and then along the guttering of the ward roof. She held on to the patient until help arrived and they could both be lowered to the safety of the ground. For this act of heroism she was awarded the Albert Medal which was exchanged for a more suitable George Cross in 1971. Under the administration of the London County Council from 1918, the asylum was renamed the Hanwell Mental Hospital in 1929.

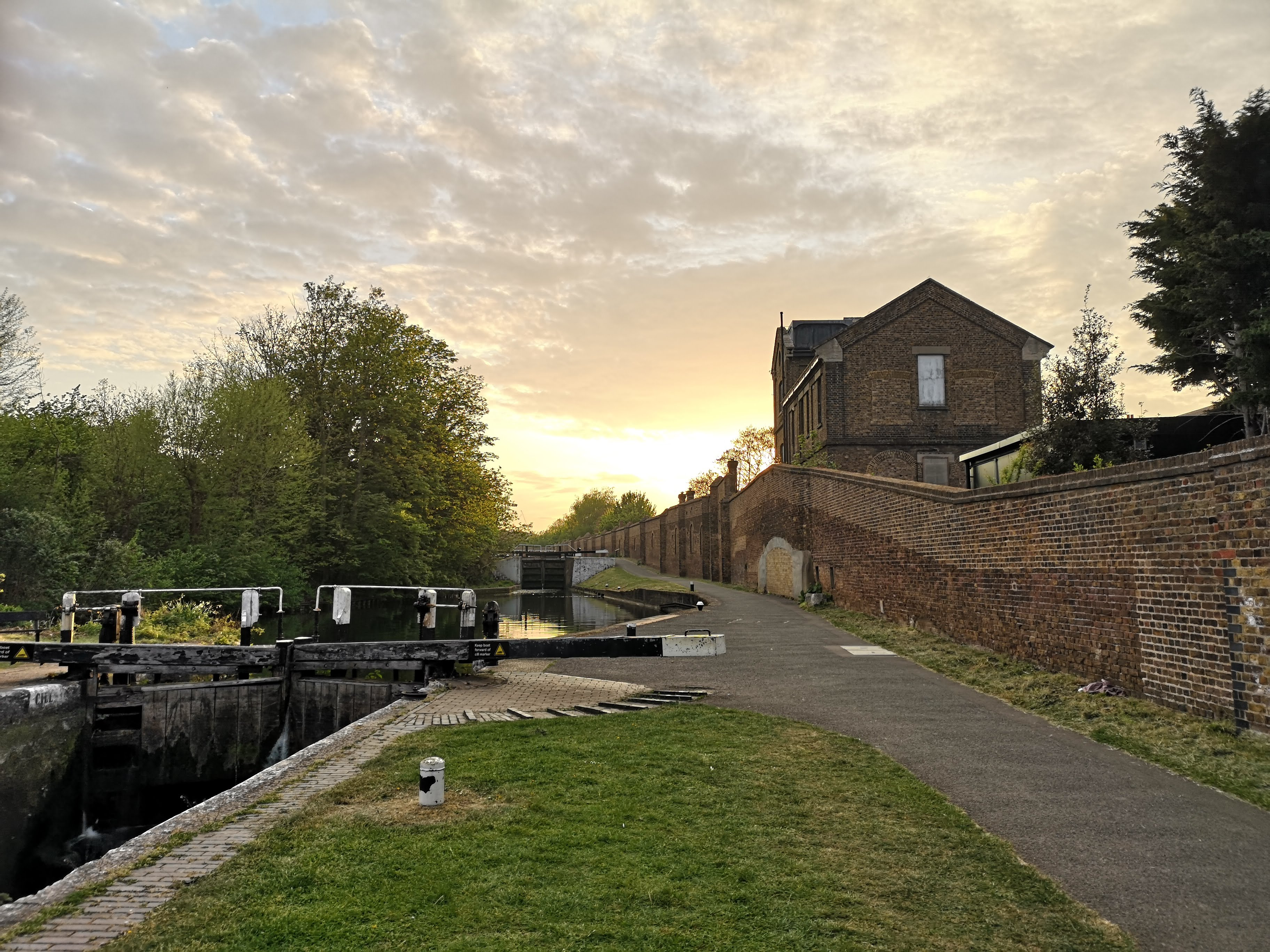
Part of the flight of locks beside the hospital

A postcard displaying an aerial photograph taken in the first half of the 1920s shows that the nurses' home has still to be built in the top right corner of the frame. It has since been demolished. Further to the top right is the railway iron bridge at the junction of Uxbridge Road (A4020) and Windmill Lane (A4127) which runs south to the left of the frame. Running down the left-hand side is a section of the 'Flight of Locks' on the Grand Union Canal.

By the 1920s there were sufficient beds to ensure that no person too ill to keep within the laws of the land (or avoid getting misled by others into transgressing the law) need be sent to gaol. Local prison population subsequently fell. The hospital was under the administration of the London County Council until 1948 when responsibility was transferred to the new National Health Service – North West Metropolitan Regional Hospital Board. The facility became St Bernard's Hospital, Southall in 1937. One ward of the hospital was used as the local Emergency Medical Services (EMS) centre, to treat war casualties during the Second World War.

Several bombs landed on the hospital and its grounds during the war. It was close to two strategic targets: the AEC factory in Windmill Lane which built fighting vehicles, and the Wharncliffe Viaduct which carried the Great Western Railway, a vital transport route. Some of the UXBs fell into the soft sediment of the River Brent, and some may still be there. However a V1 hit the hospital laundry and caused many casualties. This event is mentioned in a personal account by Simon Tobitt in WW2 Peoples War. The Gatehouse also received some bomb damage.

=== Post-war era ===
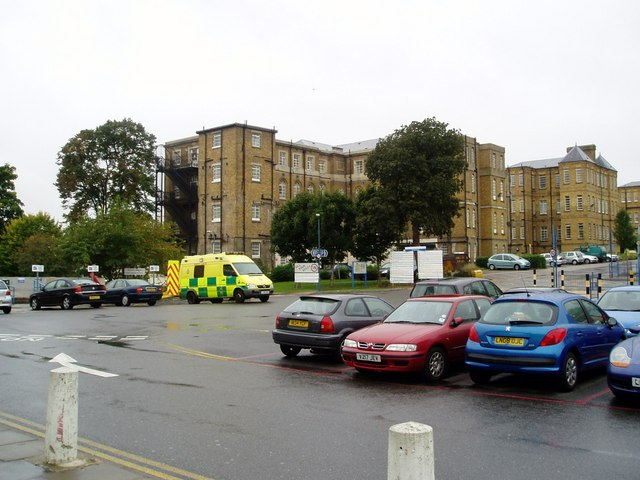
"E Block", St Bernard's Hospital

After the Second World War, new medicines (such as Chlorpromazine).were found to be effective in the treatment of many of the major mental illnesses. Following refinement and clinic trials they were introduced at the end of the 1950s and made a massive positive impact on the hospital. At last there was an effective treatment, and as a result the containment aspect of segregated patients within wards could for most wards be relaxed. As their illnesses responded to treatment patients recovered and started to be discharged. In the early 1960s the hospital accommodated circa 2,200 patients.

Dr Max Meier Glatt was one of the pioneers in the treatment of people with an addictive personality trait. Appointed as a consultant in 1958 he set up an alcohol dependency unit in a female ward. His approach of creating a "therapeutic community" with a 12-week inpatient stay to help patents come to terms with their problems and explore new methods of living in the future without their addiction was found to be a great success. In 1982 this facility was moved and became a drug and alcohol dependence unit; it moved again in 2000 and is now known as the Max Glatt Unit. It is currently run by the Central North West London Mental Health NHS Trust Substance Misuses Service.

In the mid-1970s, the Department of Health and Social Security attempted to reduce the stigma of psychiatric hospitals. At Hanwell a new district general hospital was built in the grounds of the former asylum. The whole site was then named Ealing Hospital and comprised two wings: the "General Wing" for acute patients and "Ealing Hospital, St. Bernard's Wing" for psychiatric patients.

In 1998, St. Bernard's Wing underwent a major refurbishment. It cost in excess of £4.5 million and took roughly eight months. In 2007, the Orchard Centre was opened, as a medium secure psychiatric unit for women. The Department of Health had conducted a consultation and found that women experiencing mental health problems were poorly catered for. This led to new guidelines being drawn up and published. Part of this guidance called for women who suffer mental problems, and for whom only medium secure accommodation was needed, to be treated in way that was sympathetic with their gender. The West London Mental Health Trust commissioned Tuke Manton Architects of Clapham to design the centre and Kier Group to build it.

== In popular culture ==
=== Film and television ===
The ITV 1970s TV series The Professionals filmed both outside and inside for several different episodes, most notably in one episode when a car is driven at speed towards the asylum main entrance followed by both main characters running down the white spiral staircase of the central tower into the basement below. At least one other episode uses a ward as a location where the three main characters visit a person supposedly in a general hospital ward.

Some scenes of the BBC 1970s TV series Porridge, starring Ronnie Barker, were filmed at Hanwell.

Some scenes of the 1989 Batman film starring (amongst others) Jack Nicholson as the Joker, were also filmed in empty wards at Hanwell (using K block). This went down especially well with the staff as an earlier film of Nicholson's, One Flew Over the Cuckoo's Nest (1975), set in an American psychiatric hospital, was at that time a favourite.

Some scenes of Stephen Poliakoff's film She's Been Away (1989) were filmed at the hospital. Dame Peggy Ashcroft starred as Lillian Huckle, a woman who was institutionalized 60 years before whilst still a young girl, simply because she did not conform to social norms.

In the 1963 film The Bargee, directed by Duncan Wood and starring Harry H. Corbett, Ronnie Barker, Hugh Griffith and Eric Sykes, the two bargees descend the flight of locks with the hospital in the background.

=== In literature or prose ===
G. K. Chesterton opens his early defence of Christianity, Orthodoxy, using Hanwell symbolically. A companion says “That man will get on; he believes in himself”, but Chesterton sees where this argument goes – he spies in the street an omnibus on which is written "Hanwell" and says "Shall I tell you where the men are who believe most in themselves?..." From these parallel journeys, he draws an argument that the rational materialist, just like the madman, lives in a bubble which is entirely self-consistent, but also entirely unreal, having constructed a world which is isolated from the actuality of human relationships and experience.

=== Theatre ===
Hanwell Insane Asylum was mentioned in George Bernard Shaw's 1914 play Pygmalion. Phonetics Professor Henry Higgins, after successfully telling strangers where they were born by their accent, was jokingly told he came from Hanwell Insane Asylum.

=== Museum ===
Reverend H. A. Norris (a former chaplain to the hospital) realised in the early 1980s that there were old records at hospital that were historically important and should join the others in the Greater London Council Records Library (now part of the National Archives). He feared these would be thrown out by staff, and volunteers formed the "Museum Committee" to help. They recovered much of the hospital heritage. This also included mechanical restraints, ECT machines, and some of the old fixtures and fittings. The largest item by far was the last original "seclusion room", with white stained leather-covered straw padding walls and floor. One of the books retrieved in the search by the committee was a discharge book; the first entry was within a few months of the asylum's opening and recorded the death of a young woman, listing her reason for admission as being "Continually sneezing". Also on display was a letter written by Arthur O'Connor. He had been committed to Hanwell on 6 May 1875 for firing an unloaded pistol at Queen Victoria earlier on 29 February.

=== Blue plaque ===
Dr John Conolly and the former Hanwell Asylum were commemorated with an English Heritage blue plaque in May 2022, on a wall of what was the left-hand wing of the asylum. It is the first plaque in the scheme to go up in Hanwell and the date of its installation was chosen to support Mental Health Week in the UK.

== Notes ==
wc: He was no relation to the famous civil engineer Sir William Cubitt, who lived in the same era. On a housing estate which was built during the mid-1990s on part of the original hospital grounds, the name 'Cubitt Square' was given to one of the residential areas.

m: Although the sedatives Paraldehyde (invented 1829 by Wildenbusch) and chloral hydrate (in 1832 by Justus von Liebig) were known about, they were not used (except for perhaps recreational purposes) in medicine. It was not until about the 1800s when people like Emil Kraepelin studied them, that their medical usefulness was considered. Of course, these were too dangerous to replace the traditional sedative whilst patients consumed alcohol daily. So this may have been the window for the adoption of synthetic concoctions and potions as palliatives.

br: The bricks are thought to be Smeed Dean Belgrave Yellow Stocks from Kent. The low iron and higher lime content of the mud there gives the characteristic yellow hue to the bricks.

c: The commuting of staff is a relativity recent phenomenon in the history of St. Bernard's. Before, they would have been able to live in good, clean, and habitable accommodation situated on site. Also, the normal working day back then was twelve hours long with little in the way of street lighting, so the proximity of these facilities was of great benefit. This was provided as a free and a much valued perk with which to attract people of the right calibre.
