= John Conolly =

English psychiatrist (1794–1866)

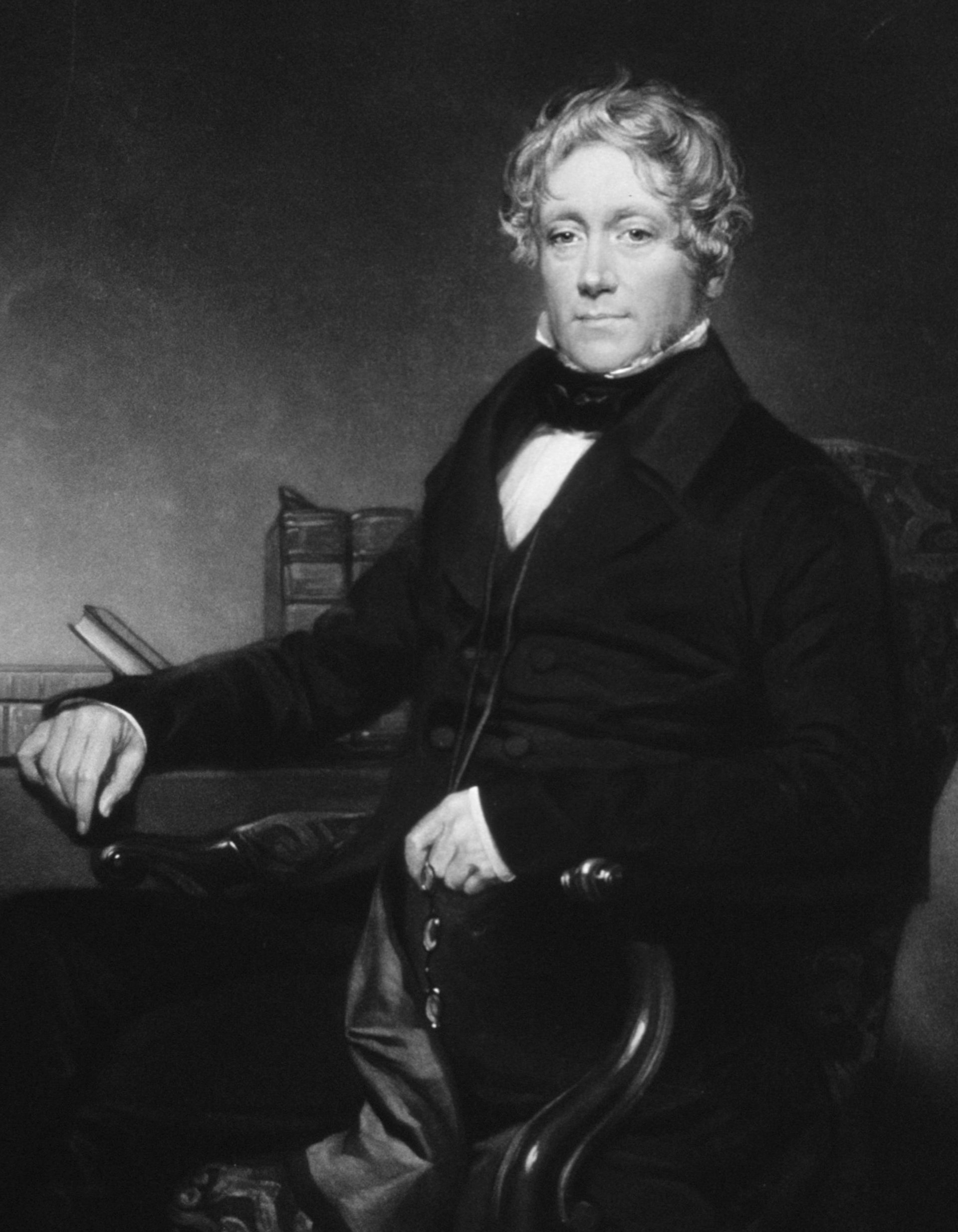
John Conolly

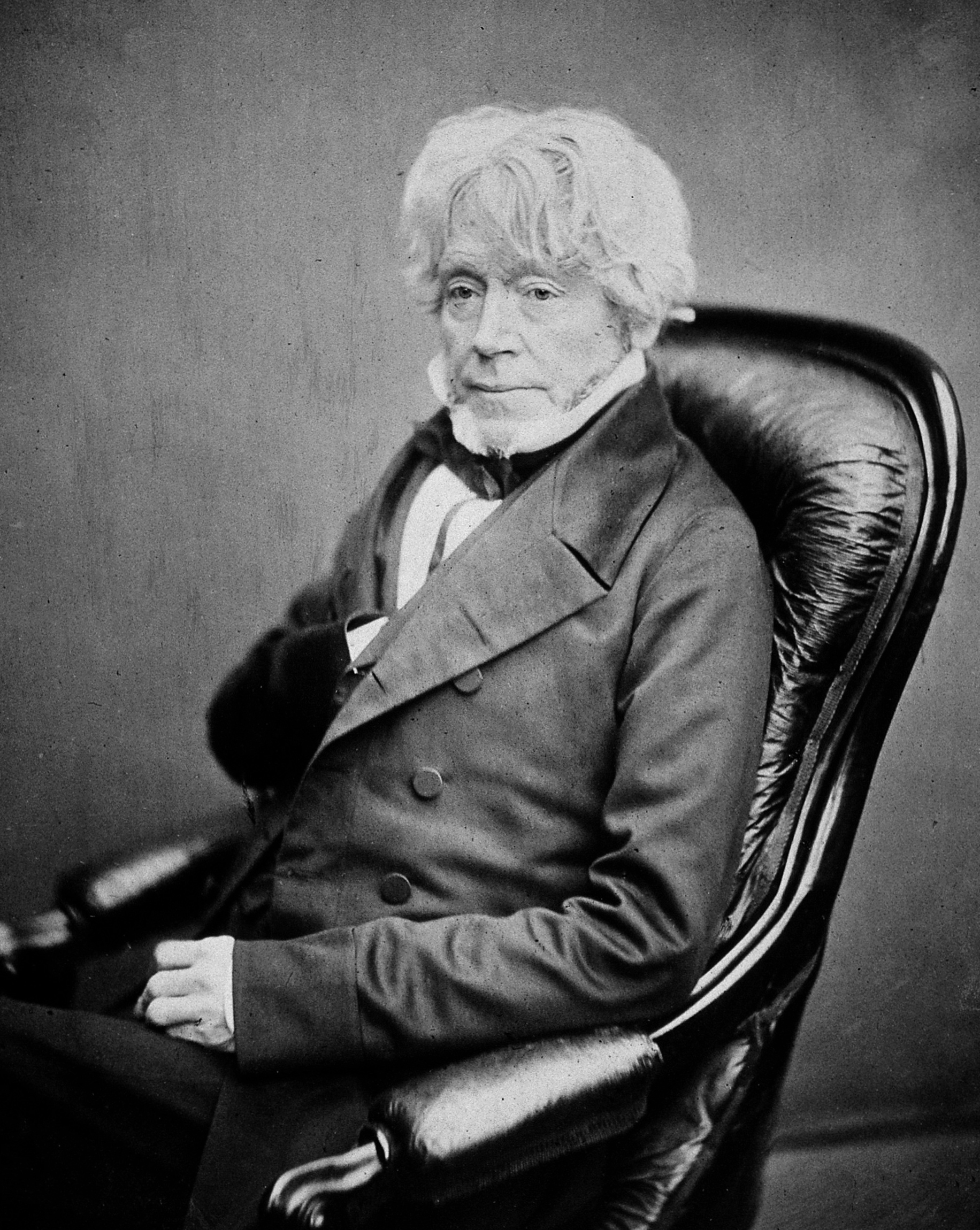
John Conolly later in life

John Conolly (27 May 1794 – 5 March 1866) was an English psychiatrist. He published the volume Indications of Insanity in 1830. In 1839, he was appointed resident physician to the Middlesex County Asylum where he introduced the principle of non-restraint into the treatment of the insane, which led to non-restraint became accepted practice throughout England. With colleagues he founded the 'Provincial Medical and Surgical Association', and founded the 'British and Foreign Medical Review, or, A Quarterly Journal of Practical Medicine'.

== Life ==
Conolly was born at Market Rasen, Lincolnshire, of an Irish family. He spent four years as a lieutenant in the Cambridgeshire Militia and lived for a year in France before embarking on a medical career. He graduated with an MD degree at University of Edinburgh in 1821. After practising at Lewes, Chichester and Stratford-on-Avon successively, he was appointed professor of the practice of medicine at University College, London, in 1828. In 1830 he published a work on the Indications of Insanity, and soon afterwards settled at Warwick.

In 1832 in co-operation with Sir Charles Hastings and Sir John Forbes, he founded a small medical association with a view to raising the standard of provincial practice called the Provincial Medical and Surgical Association. His brother William Brice Conolly became the association's 'Widows and Orphans Benevolent Fund' treasurer and secretary. In later years this grew in importance and membership, and finally became the British Medical Association.

Conolly and Forbes went on to start a new publication in 1836: the 'British and Foreign Medical Review, or, A Quarterly Journal of Practical Medicine', for which they shared the editorship from 1836 to 1839. It was the first publication of its type, aimed at sharing newly-won medical knowledge. The Review was read widely in Europe and America, and helped to promote modern methods of treatment and to enhance the reputation of British medicine. The BMA library still holds a complete set of its volumes.

In 1839, Conolly was appointed resident physician to the Middlesex County Asylum at Hanwell (now known as West London Mental Health NHS Trust's St Bernard's Hospital). In this capacity, he introduced the principle of non-restraint into the treatment of the insane. This principle had already been put into practice in two small English asylums—William Tuke's York Retreat and the Lincoln Asylum—but it was due to Conolly's courage in sweeping away all mechanical restraint in a great metropolitan asylum and in the face of strong opposition, that non-restraint became accepted practice throughout the country.

In 1840 he carried out a phrenological examination of Edward Oxford at Newgate Prison and concluded that he had been insane at the time he fired two pistols at Queen Victoria. In 1844 Conolly ceased to be resident physician at Hanwell, but he remained visiting physician until 1852.

On 21 July 1852, the honorary degree of Doctor of Civil Law was conferred on Conolly together with his two friends Dr John Forbes and Dr Charles Hastings. Conolly died on 5 March 1866 at Hanwell, where in the later part of his life he had a private asylum called Lawn House. His gravestone can still be seen in Kensington Cemetery, Uxbridge Road, Ealing.

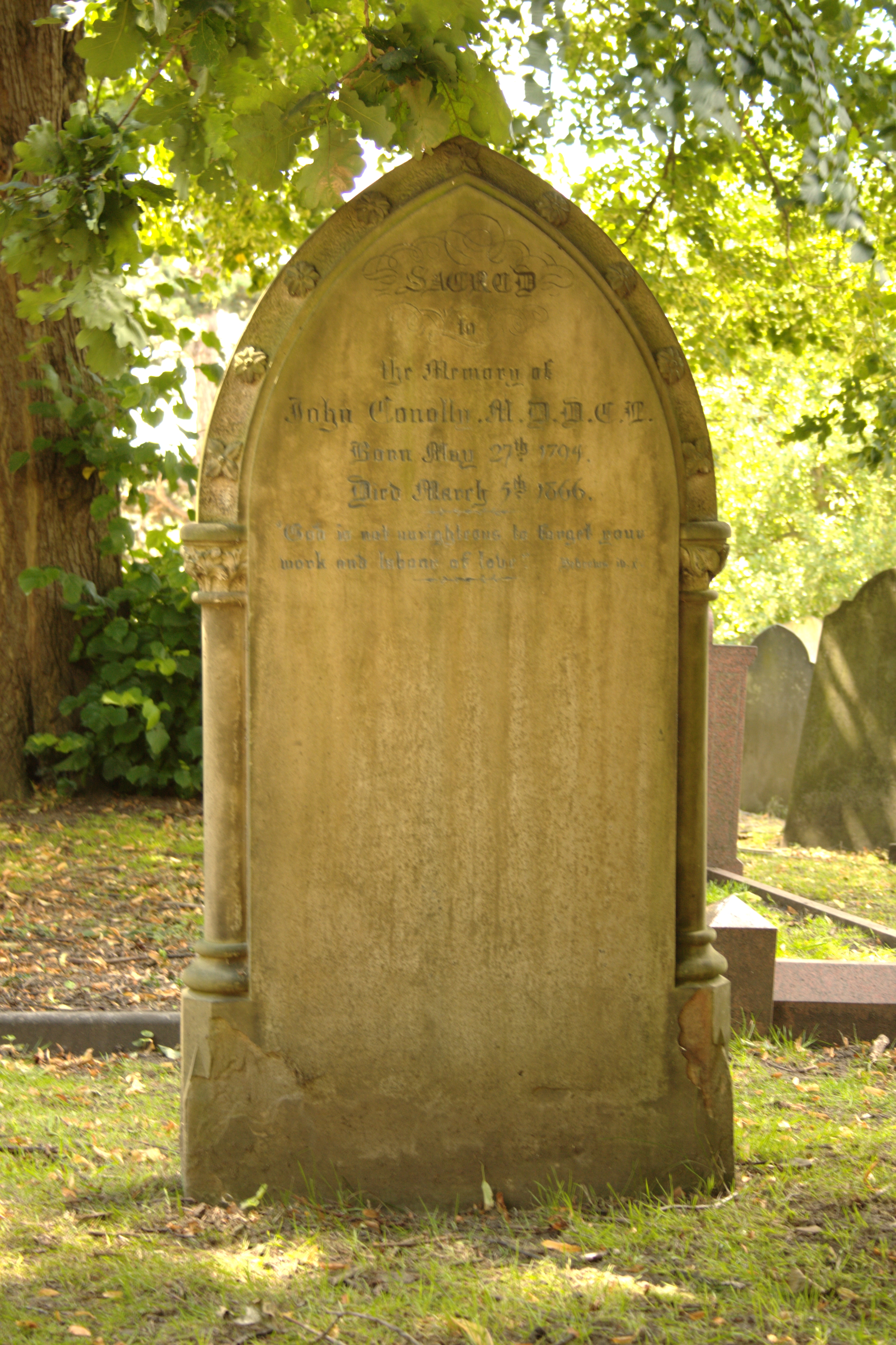
John Conolly grave stone.

== Family ==
Conolly married Elizabeth Collins, daughter of naval captain Sir John Collins, with whom he had four children. Their only son, Edward Tennyson Conolly, was born while Conolly was working at Chichester in Sussex. Edward became a lawyer, having been called to the Bar on 30 January 1852. In 1865 he emigrated with his family to Picton, New Zealand. There he continued to practise law and became very active in politics. In line with his father's concerns for humane treatment of the mentally ill, he introduced the concept of rehabilitation to the New Zealand penal system. He died in Auckland in 1908 and was interred in Remuera.

John Conolly's second daughter, Sophia Jane, married Thomas Harrington Tuke in 1852. Tuke ran a private Lunatic Asylum at Manor House in Chiswick, Middlesex (this Tuke is not related to the Tukes of the York Retreat).

Conolly's youngest child, Ann, married Henry Maudsley when she was thirty-six, just two months before her father's death. Conolly's obituary was written by Maudsley and shocked many by its unusually unsympathetic tone. Henry Maudsley had by then taken over the running of Lawn House. Ann predeceased Maudsley on 9 February 1911 at the age of 81.

== Commemoration ==
Dr John Conolly and the former Hanwell Asylum were commemorated with an English Heritage blue plaque on the 27th of May 2022, on a wall of what was the left-hand wing of the asylum, now part of St Bernard’s Hospital. It would have been his 228th Birthday. It is the first plaque in the scheme to go up in Hanwell and the date of its installation was chosen to support Mental Health Week in the UK.

== Publications ==
- Conolly, John (1830). An Inquiry concerning the Indications of Insanity, with Suggestions for the Better Protection and Care of the Insane. London: John Taylor. ISBN 9781548740023.
- Conolly, John (1847). The construction and government of lunatic asylums and hospitals for the insane. London: John Churchill.
- Conolly, John (1856). The Treatment of the Insane without Mechanical Restraints. London: Smith, Elder & Co.. German translation by Caspar Max Brosius as Conolly, John (1860). Die Behandlung der Irren ohne mechanischen Zwang. London: M. Schauenburg.
- The Indications of Insanity with an introduction by Richard Hunter and Ida MacAlpine. Psychiatric Monograph Series 4 (reprint: Dawsons, London, 1964)
- Conolly, John (1863). A study of Hamlet. London: Edward Moxon.
