= Wilhelm Langenbruch =

German graphologist

Wilhelm Langenbruch (December 23, 1860 - January 8, 1932) was a German graphologist born in Aplerbeck.

After finishing his grammar school studies, he moved to Bonn, where he worked at several trades that included locksmith, plumber, carpenter, watchmaker and bookkeeper. In Bonn he made the acquaintanceship of a publisher named Schorer, through whom he became an editor of Schorer's Familienblatt. During his time in Bonn, he developed an interest in handwriting analysis, being influenced by the work of pioneer graphologist Jean-Hippolyte Michon (1806–1881).

At the insistence of Schorer, he relocated to Berlin in 1891, where he opened a photographic art institute, and with Schorer founded the Graphologisches Bureau. In Berlin he developed a reputation as a handwriting expert, eventually performing important graphological work for the municipal judicial system.

In 1895 he published Graphologischen Studien, followed by Praktische Menschenkenntnis auf Grund der Handschrift (Practical knowledge of human nature learned from handwriting) in 1911, and Autographen-Album bedeutender und interessanter Persönlichkeiten (Autograph album of important and interesting personalities). In April 1895, with physiologist William Thierry Preyer (1841–1897) and psychiatrist Friedrich Albrecht Erlenmeyer (1849–1926), he founded a journal of palaeography and graphology titled Die Handschrift, Blatter fur wissenschaftliche Schriftkunde und Graphologie.
