= William Charles Ellis =

English psychiatrist (1780–1839)

Sir William Charles Ellis
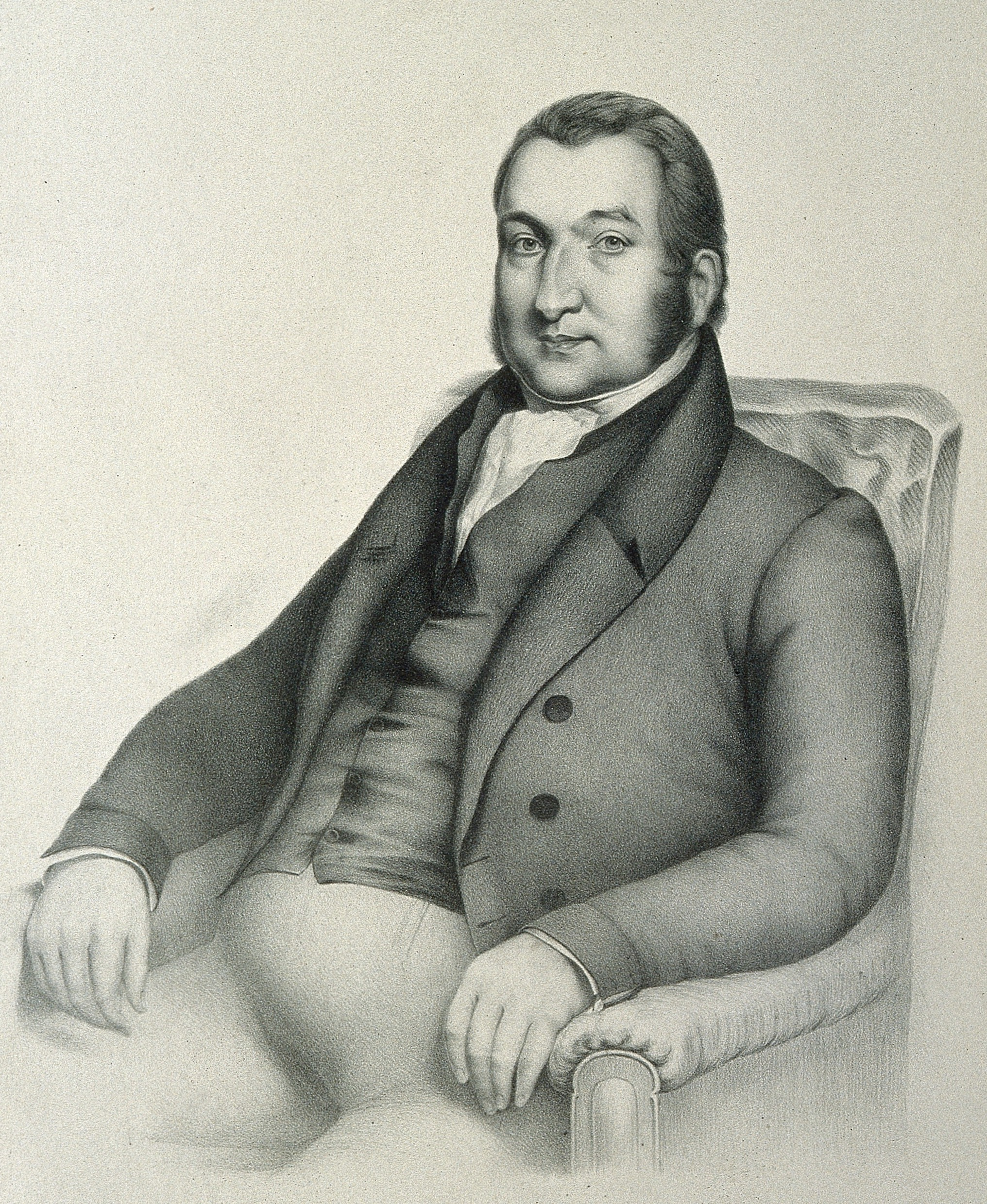
- Born: 10 March 1780; Alford, Lincolnshire, England
- Died: 24 October 1839 (aged 59); Southall, Middlesex, England
- Occupation: Physician

Sir William Charles Ellis (10 March 1780 – 24 October 1839) was an English physician who served as the superintendent of the West Riding Pauper Lunatic Asylum and later the Hanwell Asylum. His ideas on the treatment of mental illness became widely influential.

== Biography ==
Arms of Ellis of Kiddal Hall

Ellis was born in Alford, Lincolnshire and a descendant of the Ellis family of Kiddal Hall (an old Yorkshire family from which the Earls of Normanton and Viscounts Clifden, as well as the supposed inventor of Rugby William Webb Ellis and Sir William Ellis Secretary of State in exile to James II of England also descended from). He earned his Doctor of Medicine (M.D) degree and became a member of the Royal College of Surgeons. His early career was as an apothecary in Hull, but he soon took an interest in the treatment of mental disorders. This he learnt at the Sculcoates Refuge in Hull; which was run on a similar model as the York Retreat. In 1817 a William Ellis was appointed as superintendent to the newly built West Riding Pauper Lunatic Asylum at Wakefield.

A Methodist, Ellis too had strong religious convictions. With his wife as matron, he employed the same principles of humane treatment and moral therapy as practised at Sculcoates Refuge. After 13 years their reputation had become such that they were invited to run the newly built first pauper asylum in Middlesex called the Hanwell Asylum. Accepting the posts, the asylum opened in May 1831. Here the Ellis's introduced their own type of "humane treatment" and moral therapy combined with "therapeutic employment".

Ellis's approach went down well with patients: it was voluntary and made them feel valued and appreciated, so that they could recover their self-esteem. Also, by having something with real purpose to do that helped with the care of others or the running of the asylum, they could not only occupy their time, but take their minds off their troubles, so that suicides became rare. Patients who preserved their everyday skills in this way found it easier to pick up their lives again, when they were well enough to leave, which now came sooner, as the methods speeded their recovery. Ellis became famous in his lifetime for his pioneering work and adherence to this "Great Principle of Therapeutic Employment". He was rewarded with a knighthood by William IV in 1835.

Here it is worth noting that the records which appear to show poorer recovery rates than those achieved today are total patient counts. As the new asylum system grew, so did the number of those admitted who were deemed "incurable" and so different from the "lunatic insane" for whom these institutions had been built. The majority of these new classes of patients were elderly, being sent by workhouses as being ill and close to death. Furthermore, before the introduction of antibiotics there were other incurables entering, such as those with tertiary syphilis and gonorrhea. Towards the end of the 19th century, greater numbers suffering from epilepsy were also admitted. All these extra patients had the effect of slewing some modern accounts critical of the effectiveness of these early establishments, despite a mass of comprehensive, detailed records surviving from the period.

Ellis resigned his post at Hanwell in 1838. This occurred because the visiting justices sought to expand the capacity of the asylum again. Since the institution was wholly funded by a levy on local rates, it was becoming important, in the opinion of the justices, to make best use of the assets and money spent. There were records and statistics to demonstrate that this was indeed being achieved, but it required a detailed change in the way the asylum was organized, managed and run.

William and his wife Mildred enjoyed being involved in all aspects of patient care and staff oversight, to create a "domestic" or homely environment (or as reinvented today, "nidotherapy").

As Ellis stated in that year:

It is evident, that for the patients to have all the care they require, there should never be more than can, with comfort, be attended to: from 100 to 120, are as many as ought to be in any one house; where they are beyond that the individual cases cease to excite the attention they ought; and if once that is the case, not one half the good can be expected to result.

These intended changes precluded the couple from continuing to do what their heartfelt conviction demanded. He and Lady Ellis set up their own private asylum for a few ladies and gentlemen of the upper social classes, quite nearby in the grounds of Southall Park, this being a former residence of Lord Montford.

Ellis was a very large man, plagued throughout his life by ill health. This precipitated an untimely death from dropsy a short while later, on 24 October 1839.
