= Cassel Hospital =

Hospital in Richmond, London

- West London NHS Trust
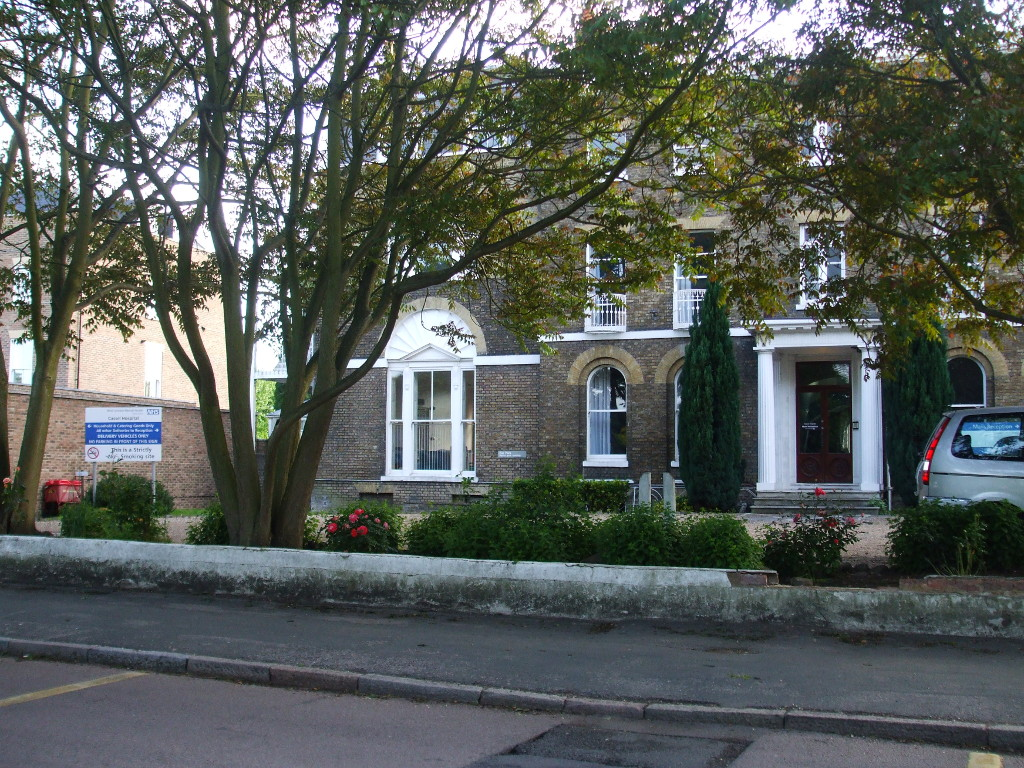

- Location within Richmond upon Thames

Geography
- Location: 1 Ham Common, Ham, Richmond TW10 7JF (London Borough of Richmond upon Thames), England
- Coordinates: 51.4328°N 0.3078°W

Organisation
- Care system: NHS England
- Type: Specialist

Services
- Emergency department: No
- Speciality: Psychiatry

Helipads
- Helipad: No

History
- Founded: 1919

Links
- Website: www.westlondon.nhs.uk/our-services/adult/mental-health-services/cassel-hospital

Listed Building – Grade II
- Official name: Cassel Hospital
- Designated: 10 January 1950
- Reference no.: 1080829

The Cassel Hospital is a psychiatric facility in a Grade II listed building at 1 Ham Common, Richmond, Ham in the London Borough of Richmond upon Thames. It is run by the West London NHS Trust.

== History ==
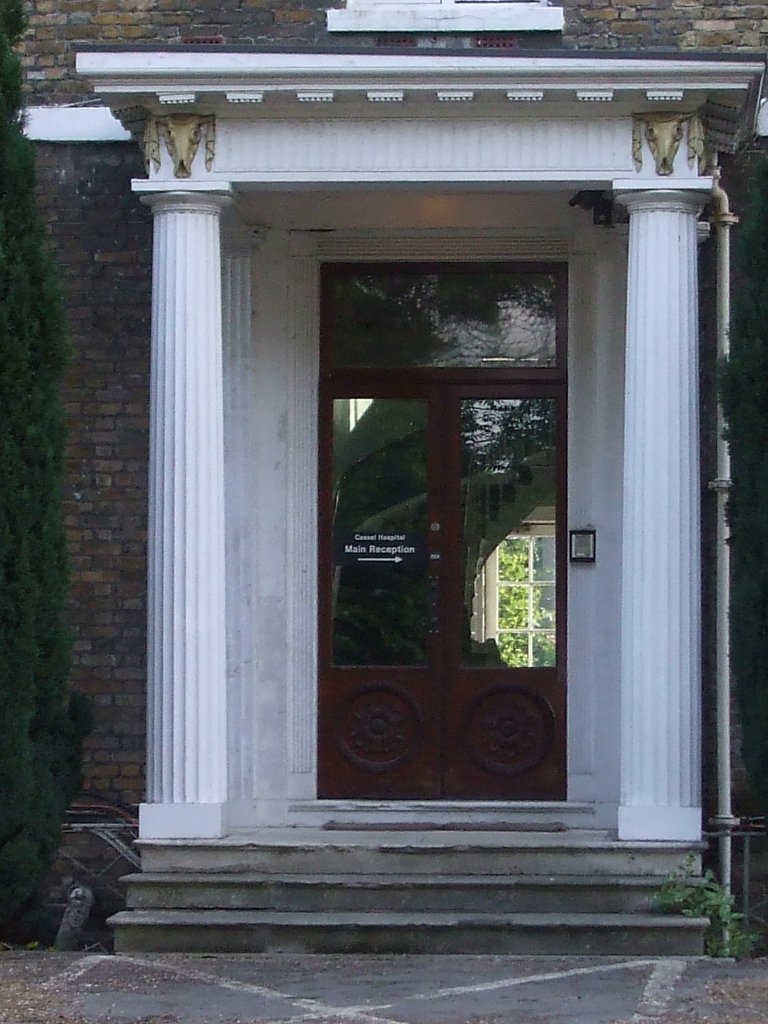
The main doorway to the hospital

=== The hospital ===
The hospital was founded and endowed by Ernest Cassel in England in 1919. It was initially for the treatment of "shell shock" victims. Originally at Swaylands in Penshurst, Kent, it moved to Stoke-on-Trent during the Second World War. In 1948 it relocated to its present site at No. 1 Ham Common, Ham.

=== The building ===
The present hospital was originally a late 18th-century house known as Morgan House after its owner, philanthropist and writer, John Minter Morgan. Morgan died in 1854 and is buried in nearby St Andrew's Church, Ham.

In 1863 it became home to the newly married Duc de Chartres. The Princess Marie of Orléans was born here in January 1865, the first of his four children born here. In 1879 it became West Heath Girls' School. The school moved to its present site in Sevenoaks, Kent in the 1930s, and the building became the Lawrence Hall Hotel until its purchase by the Cassel Foundation in 1947. The building was Grade II listed in 1950. In 2023, the West London NHS Trust indicated that it planned to vacate the site and allow its redevelopment at a future date.

== Facilities ==
The hospital developed approaches informed by psychoanalytic thinking alongside pharmacological interventions, techniques of group and individual psychotherapy. It was here that Tom Main, along with Doreen Wedell (the hospital's Matron from 1946 to 1963), pioneered the concept of a therapeutic community in the late 1940s. Together they pioneered and developed the concept of psychosocial nursing. By promoting and being proud of the role of the nurse – rather than try to imitate therapists; working alongside the patient in everyday activities, Weddell & Main developed a whole new way of working that reduced dependence upon services and fostered patients' working collaboratively. Nurses were supported and taught to understand their reparative need, to challenge their sense of omnipotence and to rely on the patient group as the most useful resource. In 1948 Eileen Skellern came for her training and joined the staff in 1949.

The hospital formally established a research department in 1995 and has collaborative relationships with University College London, Imperial College and the Centre for the Economics of Mental Health at the Institute of Psychiatry, London.

It is now a psychotherapeutic community which provides day, residential, and outreach services for young people and adults diagnosed with severe and enduring personality disorders.
