= Bendorf =

- Town
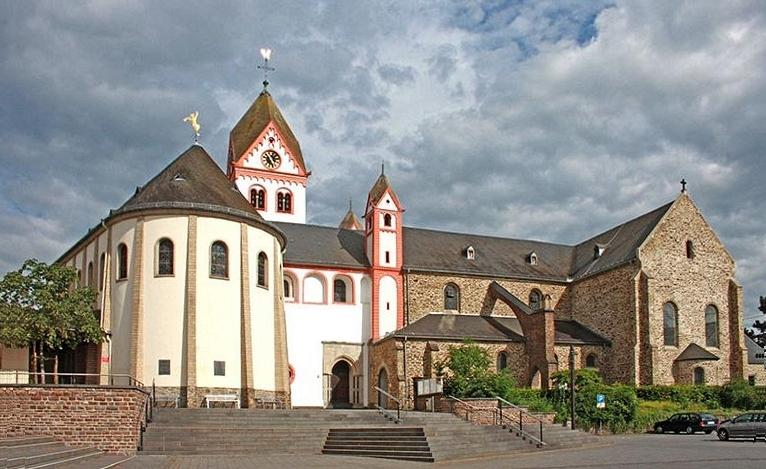
- Saint Medard Church

- Coat of arms

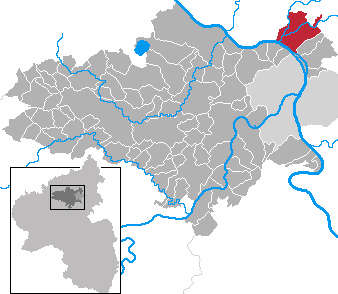
- Location of Bendorf within Mayen-Koblenz district
- Interactive map of Bendorf
- Location within Germany Location within Rhineland-Palatinate
- Coordinates: 50°25′47″N 7°34′13″E
- Country: Germany
- State: Rhineland-Palatinate
- District: Mayen-Koblenz

Government
  - Mayor (2020–28): Christoph Mohr (SPD)

Area
  - Total: 24.12 km^{2} (9.31 sq mi)
- Elevation: 115 m (377 ft)

Population (2025-12-31)
  - Total: 17,661
  - Density: 732.2/km^{2} (1,896/sq mi)
- Time zone: UTC+01:00 (CET)
  - Summer (DST): UTC+02:00 (CEST)
- Postal codes: 56170
- Dialling codes: 02622
- Vehicle registration: MYK
- Website: www.bendorf.de

Bendorf (German pronunciation: [ˈbɛndɔʁf]) is a town in the district of Mayen-Koblenz, in Rhineland-Palatinate, Germany, on the right bank of the Rhine, approx. 7 kilometres (4 miles) north of Koblenz.

== Structure of the town ==
The town consists of the following districts:

- Bendorf
- Sayn
- Mülhofen
- Stromberg

== Economy ==
From the 18th century, Bendorf was dominated by mining and the metallurgical industry. The most imposing relic of this era is the Sayner Hütte (Sayn mine works). The ores of the Bendorfer mine works came from the Trierischer Loh iron-ore mine. The Rhine port of Bendorf dates from 1900. In addition to handling clay and basalt, it has the largest oil-storage facilities between Mainz and Cologne.

Today the former industrial city is home to many retail stores. Bendorf Focus is an association of traders, the aim of which is to improve the local economy.

The Bendorf Vierwindenhöhe FM radio transmitter is situated on the hill known as Vierwindenhöhe.

=== Transport ===
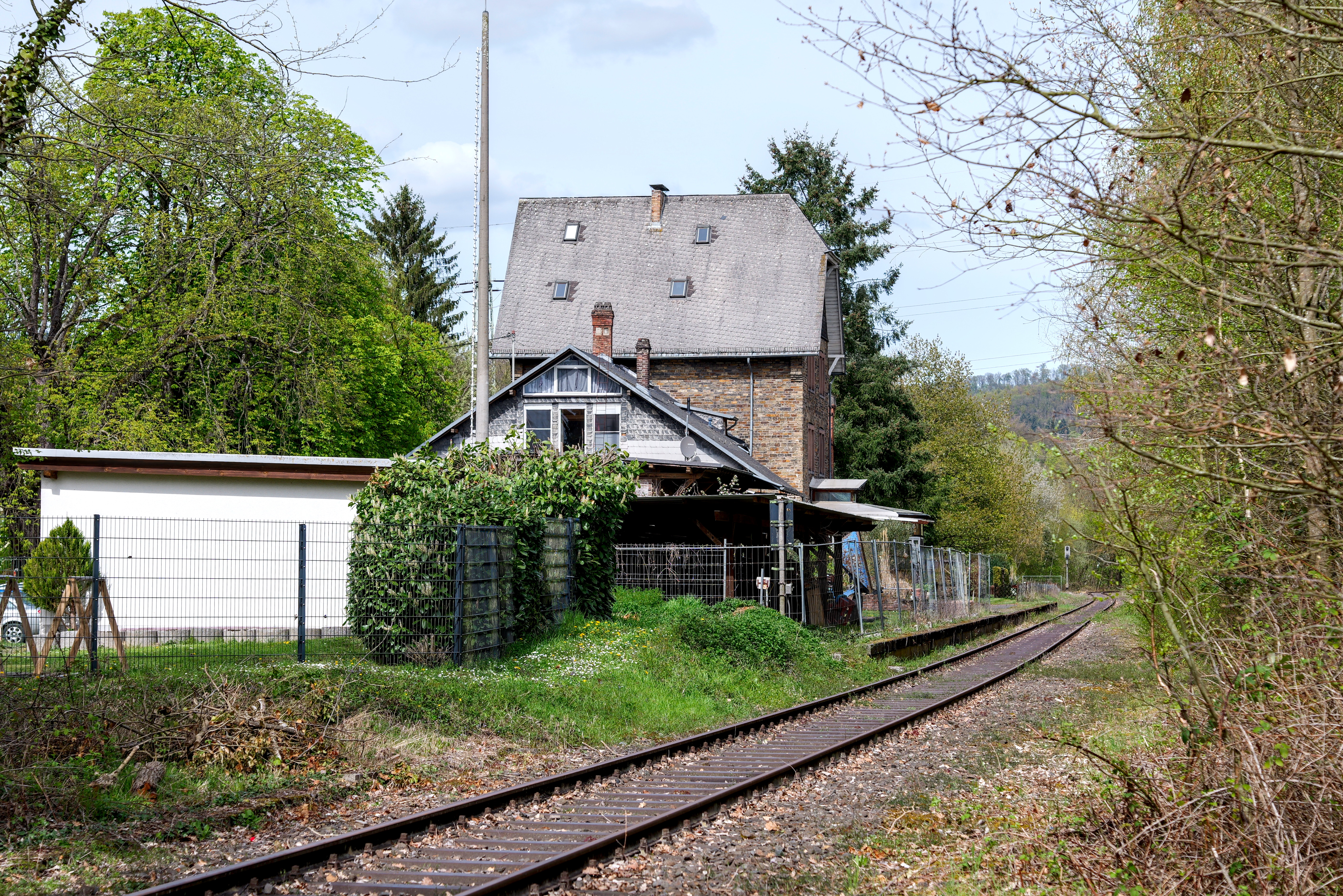
Bendorf-Sayn train stop

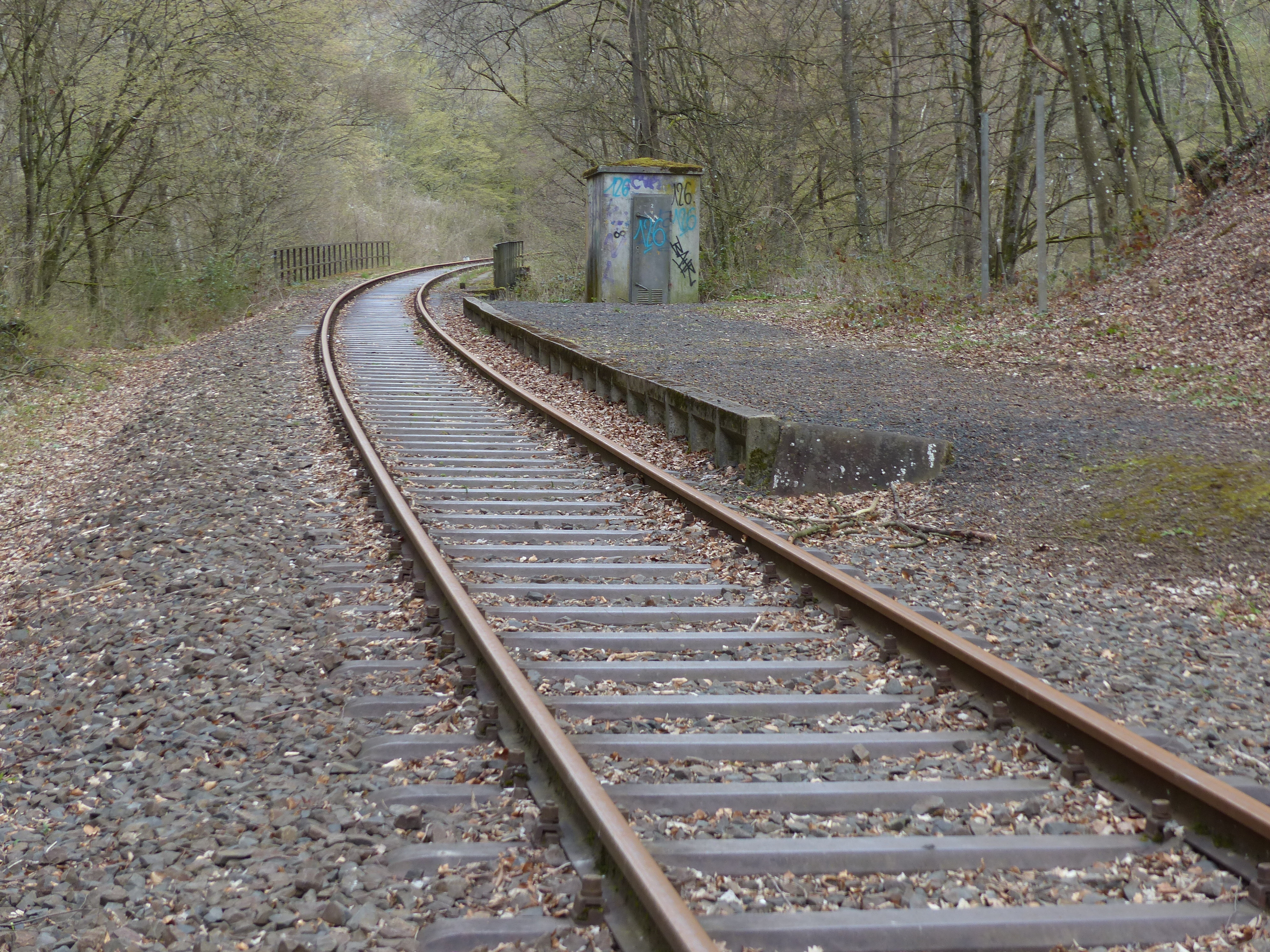
Bendorf Pfadfinderlager stop

The Engers–Au railway line passes through Bendorf although it currently is out of service. Also the right Rhine railway, which is in service, is located close to Bendorf, but without a station.

== Climate ==
Climate data for Bendorf (1991–2020 normals)
Month	Jan	Feb	Mar	Apr	May	Jun	Jul	Aug	Sep	Oct	Nov	Dec	Year
Mean daily maximum °C (°F)	5.2 (41.4)	6.7 (44.1)	11.7 (53.1)	16.6 (61.9)	20.3 (68.5)	23.4 (74.1)	25.2 (77.4)	25.5 (77.9)	20.6 (69.1)	15.1 (59.2)	9.3 (48.7)	5.2 (41.4)	15.2 (59.4)
Daily mean °C (°F)	2.5 (36.5)	3.4 (38.1)	6.7 (44.1)	10.7 (51.3)	14.3 (57.7)	17.3 (63.1)	19.3 (66.7)	19.0 (66.2)	14.8 (58.6)	10.6 (51.1)	6.4 (43.5)	2.7 (36.9)	10.5 (50.9)
Mean daily minimum °C (°F)	−0.3 (31.5)	0.2 (32.4)	2.7 (36.9)	5.3 (41.5)	9.0 (48.2)	12.0 (53.6)	13.8 (56.8)	13.6 (56.5)	10.4 (50.7)	7.0 (44.6)	3.8 (38.8)	0.3 (32.5)	6.3 (43.3)
Average precipitation mm (inches)	41.5 (1.63)	34.4 (1.35)	44.6 (1.76)	36.1 (1.42)	59.1 (2.33)	65.8 (2.59)	75.9 (2.99)	62.1 (2.44)	62.6 (2.46)	49.3 (1.94)	52.6 (2.07)	52.8 (2.08)	630.0 (24.80)
Average precipitation days (≥ 1.0 mm)	15.1	13.9	16.0	12.6	14.4	13.8	15.7	13.4	13.4	15.1	17.5	17.3	177.6
Average relative humidity (%)	82.9	80.5	74.0	69.4	70.3	70.6	70.7	70.9	78.4	82.1	85.0	85.4	76.8
Mean monthly sunshine hours	52.2	68.0	118.8	177.6	195.1	202.3	192.2	197.4	137.9	94.7	42.9	40.0	1,486.4
Source: NOAA

== In literature ==
Heinrich Böll's short story Wanderer, kommst du nach Spa... is set in Bendorf.

== Notable people ==
- de:Georg Bauer (Politiker, 1900) (1900-1983), politician (SPD), Member of Landtag Rhineland-Palatinate, honorary citizen of the city of Bendorf
- Bernard Borggreve (1836-1914), forestry scientist
- Caspar Max Brosius (1825-1910), physician and psychiatrist
- Friedrich Albrecht Erlenmeyer (1849-1926), physician and psychiatrist
- Antonio Flores (born 1972), football manager and former player
- Jenny Groß (born 1986), politician (CDU)
- Stefan Haben (born 1987), footballer
- Dirk Henn (born 1960), board game designer
- Hermann Junker (1877-1962), egyptologist and Catholic priest
- Ralph Kaufmann (born 1969), mathematician
- Hans Werner Kettenbach (pseudonym: Christian Ohlig ) (born 1928), journalist, writer and screenwriter
- Engelbert Krauskopf (1820-1881), German-American settler, gunsmith, and naturalist
- Alexander Müller (born 1969), politician
- Jutta Nardenbach (1968-2018), footballer
- Theodor Wiegand (1864-1936), archaeologist
