= Karl Wilhelm Wutzer =

German surgeon (1789–1863)

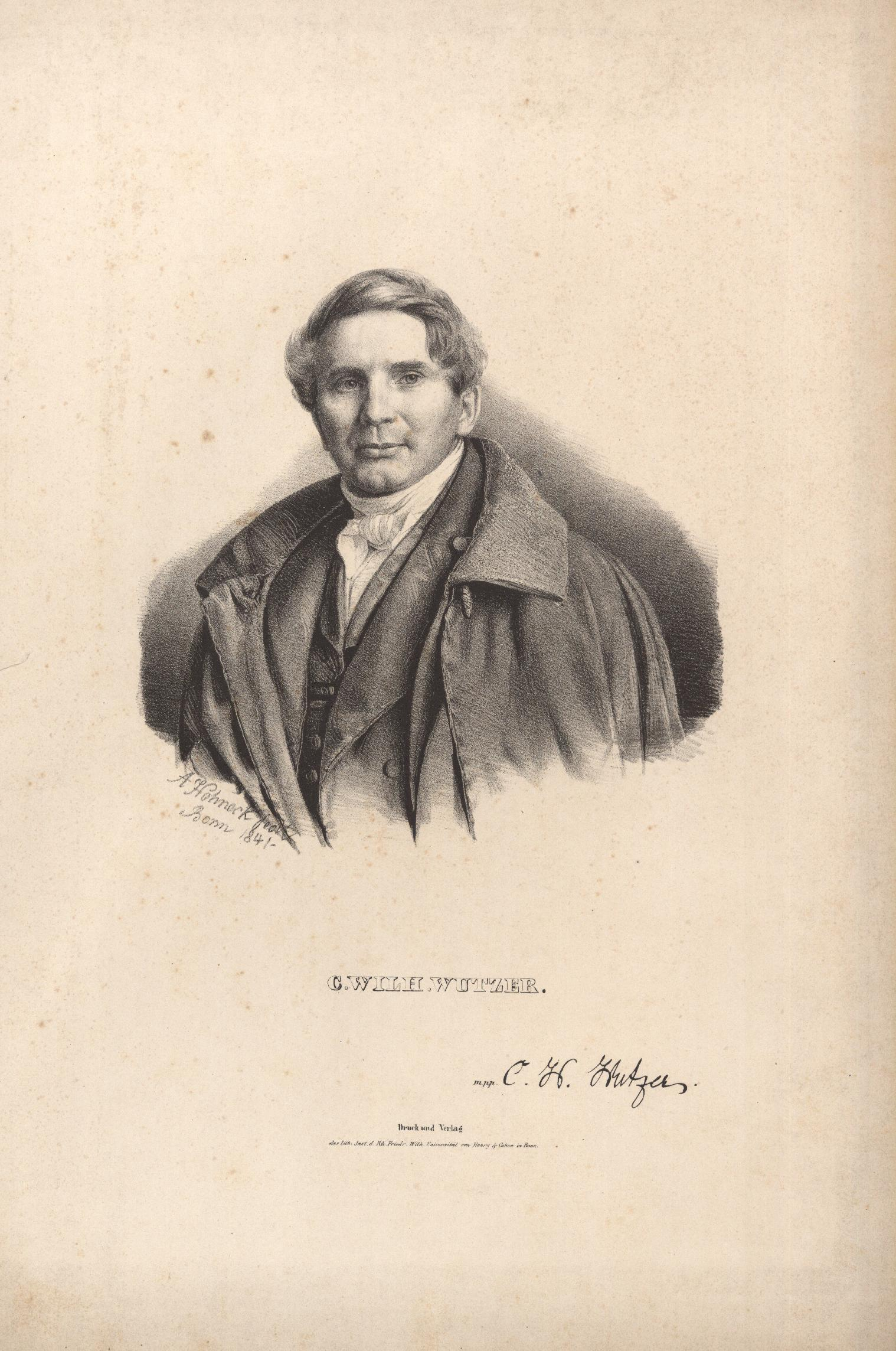
Karl Wilhelm Wutzer

Karl Wilhelm Wutzer (17 March 1789, Berlin – 19 September 1863, Bonn) was a German surgeon.

He studied medicine at the Berlin-Pépinière (military institute), later becoming director of the surgical school at Münster (1821). In 1830 he succeeded Karl August Weinhold (1782-1829) as professor of surgery at Halle, afterwards (1833), relocating to the University of Bonn as a successor to Philipp Franz von Walther (1782-1849). In 1850 he began to experience serious eye problems, a condition that eventually put an end to his surgical career.

As a surgeon, he originated an operative procedure for inguinal hernia, and was an early practitioner of surgery for vesico-vaginal fistula (VVF).

In the field of ophthalmology, he published a translation of a work by Antonius Gerardus van Onsenoort (1782-1841) with the title of, Geschichte der Augenheilkunde als Einleitung in das Studium (History of ophthalmology as an introduction to study).
