= Bertius Inlet =

Body of water in Graham Land, Antarctica

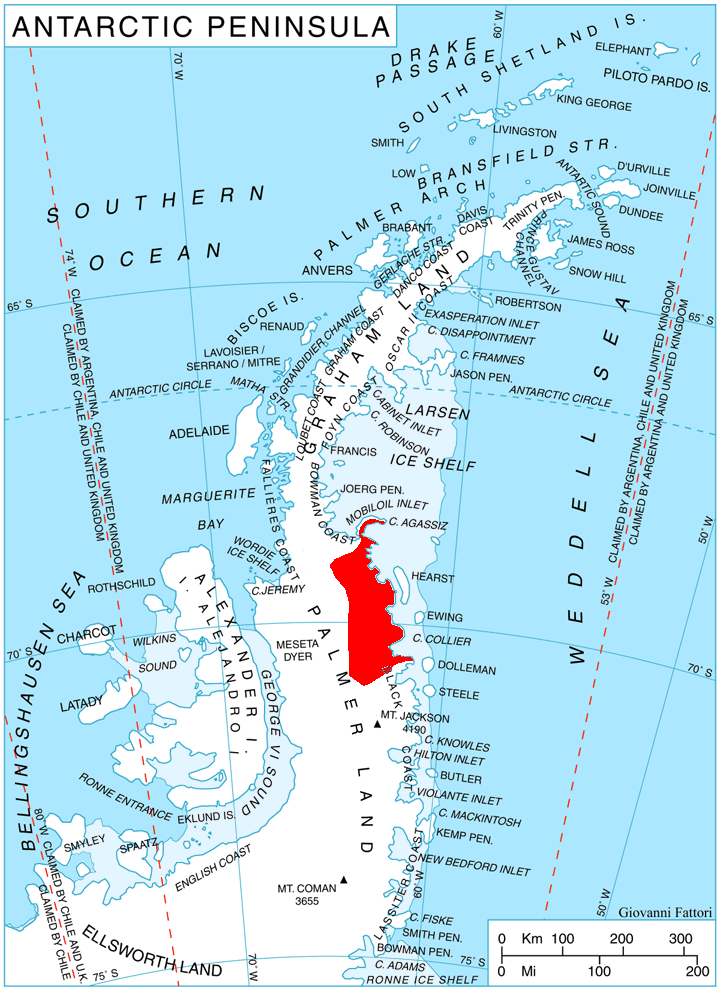
Location of Wilkins Coast on Antarctic Peninsula.

Bertius Inlet (Bulgarian: залив Бертий, ‘Zaliv Bertius’ \'za-liv 'ber-tiy\) is the 8.3 km wide ice-filled inlet indenting for 9 km Wilkins Coast on the Antarctic Peninsula. It is entered south of Cape Walcott and north of Cape Hinks, and has its head fed by Lurabee Glacier.

The feature is named after the Flemish geographer and cartographer Petrus Bertius (Pieter de Bert, 1565–1629) who published an early separate map of Terra Australis Incognita in 1616.

== Location ==
Bertius Inlet is centred at 69°10′30″S 63°21′30″W. British mapping in 1963 and 1976.

== Maps ==
- British Antarctic Territory. Scale 1:200000 topographic map. DOS 610 Series, Sheet W 69 62. Directorate of Overseas Surveys, Tolworth, UK, 1963.
- British Antarctic Territory: Palmer Land. Scale 1:250000 topographic map. BAS 250 Series, Sheet SR 19–20. London, 1976.
- Antarctic Digital Database (ADD). Scale 1:250000 topographic map of Antarctica. Scientific Committee on Antarctic Research (SCAR). Since 1993, regularly upgraded and updated.
