= Casey Inlet =

Body of water in Palmer Land, Antarctica

- Location within Antarctica
- Location: Wilkins Coast, Antarctic Peninsula, Antarctica
- Coordinates: 69°0′S 63°35′W
- Type: Inlet
- Ocean/sea sources: Weddell Sea

Casey Inlet (69°0′S 63°35′W) is an ice-filled inlet at the terminus of Casey Glacier, between Miller Point and Cape Walcott, on the east coast of Palmer Land, Antarctica.

== Location ==
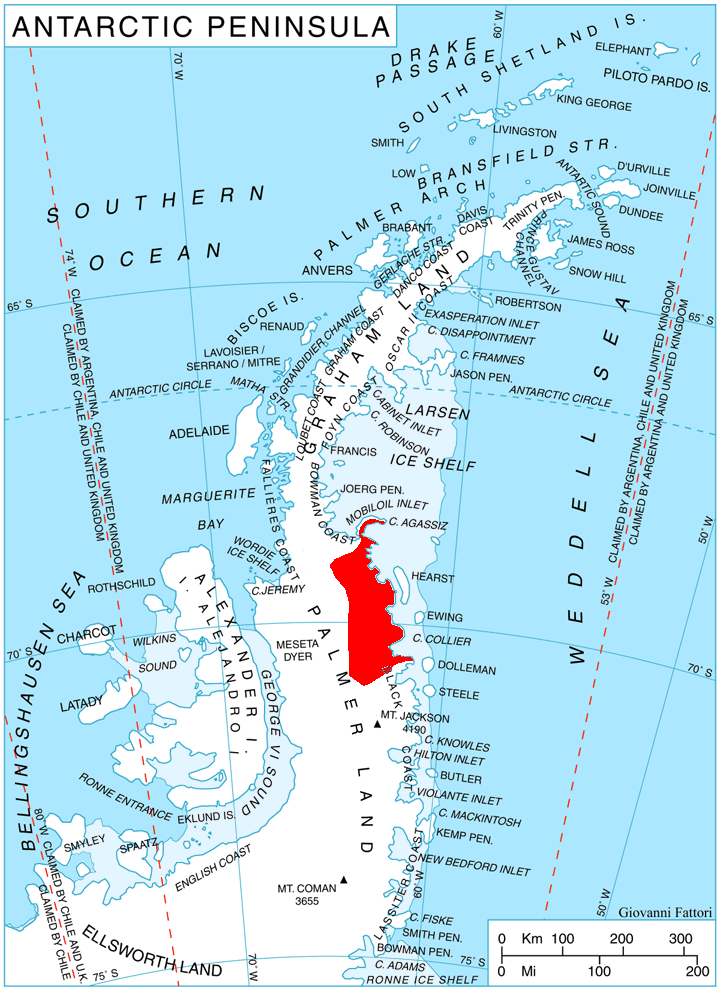
Location of Wilkins Coast on Antarctic Peninsula.

Casey Inlet is on the Wilkins Coast of Palmer Land on the Antarctic Peninsula, beside the Weddell Sea to the east. It is north of Scripps Heights and Stefansson Strait, south of Revelle Inlet and the Hollick-Kenyon Peninsula, southeast of Bowman Inlet, east of the Morgan Upland and northeast of the Wakefield Highland. The mouth of the inlet is between Miller Point to the north and Cape Walcott to the south. The Athene Glacier enters the inlet to the southwest of Mount Argus. The Casey Glacier enters the inlet from the west. It is fed by Sunfix Glacier from the southwest and Grimley Glacier from the west, which joins Casey Glacier just west of Fin Nunatak.

== Discoverty and name ==
Casey Inlet was photographed from the air by Sir Hubert Wilkins in 1928, Lincoln Ellsworth in 1935 and the United States Antarctic Service (USAS) in 1940. It was surveyed by the Falkland Islands Dependencies Survey (FIDS) in 1947. The inlet takes its name from Casey Glacier.

== Features ==
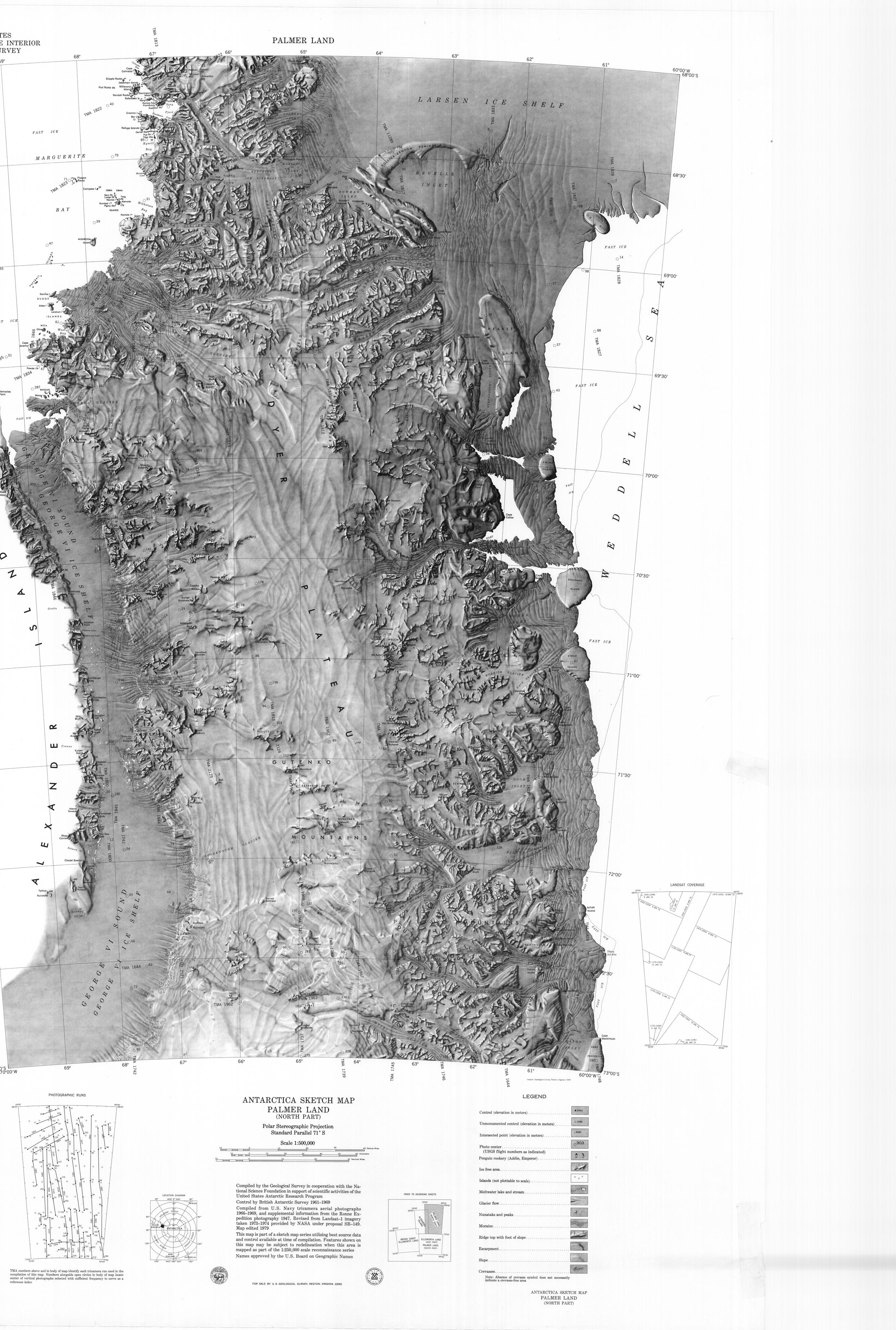
Northern Palmer Land. Casey Inlet northeast of center of map

=== Miller Point ===
68°56′S 63°23′W. A black, rock cape rising to 250 metres (820 ft) high and forming the north side of the entrance to Casey Inlet. Discovered by Sir Hubert Wilkins in a flight on December 20, 1928, and named by him for George E. Miller of Detroit, Michigan. It has been more fully defined as a result of flights by Lincoln Ellsworth in 1935, and by the flights and sledge journey along this coast from East Base by members of the USAS in 1940.

=== Athene Glacier ===
68°56′S 64°00′W. A glacier, 10 nautical miles (19 km; 12 mi) long, flowing east and merging with the terminus of Casey Glacier where it discharges into Casey Inlet. Photographed from the air by FIDS in August 1947, and by Ronne Antarctic Research Expedition (RARE; Trimetrogon air photography) in December 1947. Surveyed by FIDS in November 1960. Named by UK-APC after Athene, daughter of Zeus and goddess of the city of Athens in Greek mythology.

=== Mount Argus ===
68°53′S 63°52′W. A large isolated mountain mass, surmounted by three separate peaks, the highest 1,220 metres (4,000 ft) high. It stands between Poseidon Pass and Athene Glacier, 10 nautical miles (19 km; 12 mi) west-northwest of Miller Point. The mountain was photographed from the air by the United States Antarctic Service on September 28, 1940. It was the subject of geological investigation by A.G. Fraser of BAS in 1961. Named by UK-APC (1963) after Argus, son of the god Zeus in Greek mythology.

=== Casey Glacier ===
69°00′S 63°50′W. A glacier 6 nautical miles (11 km; 6.9 mi) wide, flowing east into Casey Inlet. Discovered by Sir Hubert Wilkins on an aerial flight of December 20, 1928. Wilkins believed the feature to be a channel cutting completely across Antarctic Peninsula, naming it "Casey Channel" after Rt. Hon. Richard G. Casey. Correlation of aerial photographs taken by Lincoln Ellsworth in 1935 and preliminary reports of the British Graham Land expedition (BGLE), 1934-37, led W. L. G. Joerg to interpret this glacier to be what Wilkins named "Casey Channel". This interpretation is borne out by the results of subsequent exploration by members of the East Base of the USAS in 1940.

=== Sunfix Glacier ===
69°16′S 64°30′W. A tributary glacier, 15 nautical miles (28 km; 17 mi) long and 2 nautical miles (3.7 km; 2.3 mi) wide, draining east-northeast between Grimley Glacier and Lurabee Glacier into Casey Glacier. Photographed from the air by RARE on December 22, 1947. Surveyed by FIDS in November 1960. The name derives from the important sun fix for latitude which was observed by FIDS at the head of this glacier, an area where cloud seldom allows such observation.

=== Grimley Glacier ===
69°09′S 64°40′W. A tributary glacier, 15 nautical miles (28 km; 17 mi) long and 3 nautical miles (5.6 km; 3.5 mi) wide. It lies 3 nautical miles (5.6 km; 3.5 mi) north of Sunfix Glacier and flows east-northeast into Casey Glacier. The glacier was photographed from the air by the USAS on September 28, 1940, and by RARE on December 22, 1947. It was surveyed by FIDS in December 1960. Named by UK-APC for Peter H. Grimley of FIDS, geologist at Horseshoe Island and Stonington Island in 1960.

=== Fin Nunatak ===
69°03′S 64°03′W. A nunatak 805 metres (2,641 ft) high in the middle of Casey Glacier. The nunatak was photographed from the air by Sir Hubert Wilkins on December 20, 1928, and was first mapped from these photos by W. L. G. Joerg. Surveyed by FIDS in December 1960. The name by the UK Antarctic Place-Names Committee (UK-APC) is suggested by the fin-like shape of the feature.

== Sources ==
- Alberts, Fred G., ed. (1995), Geographic Names of the Antarctic (PDF) (2 ed.), United States Board on Geographic Names This article incorporates public domain material from websites or documents of the United States Board on Geographic Names.
- Palmer Land, USGS: United States Geological Survey

This article incorporates public domain material from websites or documents of the United States Geological Survey.
