= Scripps Heights =

Mountains in Antarctica

- Location within Antarctica

Geography
- Continent: Antarctica
- Region: Palmer Land
- Range coordinates: 69°8′S 63°40′W

Scripps Heights (69°8′S 63°40′W) are rugged heights which are largely ice-covered, surmounting the peninsula between Casey Glacier and Lurabee Glacier on the east coast of Palmer Land, Antarctica. Deeply scarred by glaciers, the heights terminate on the east in Cape Walcott.

== Location ==
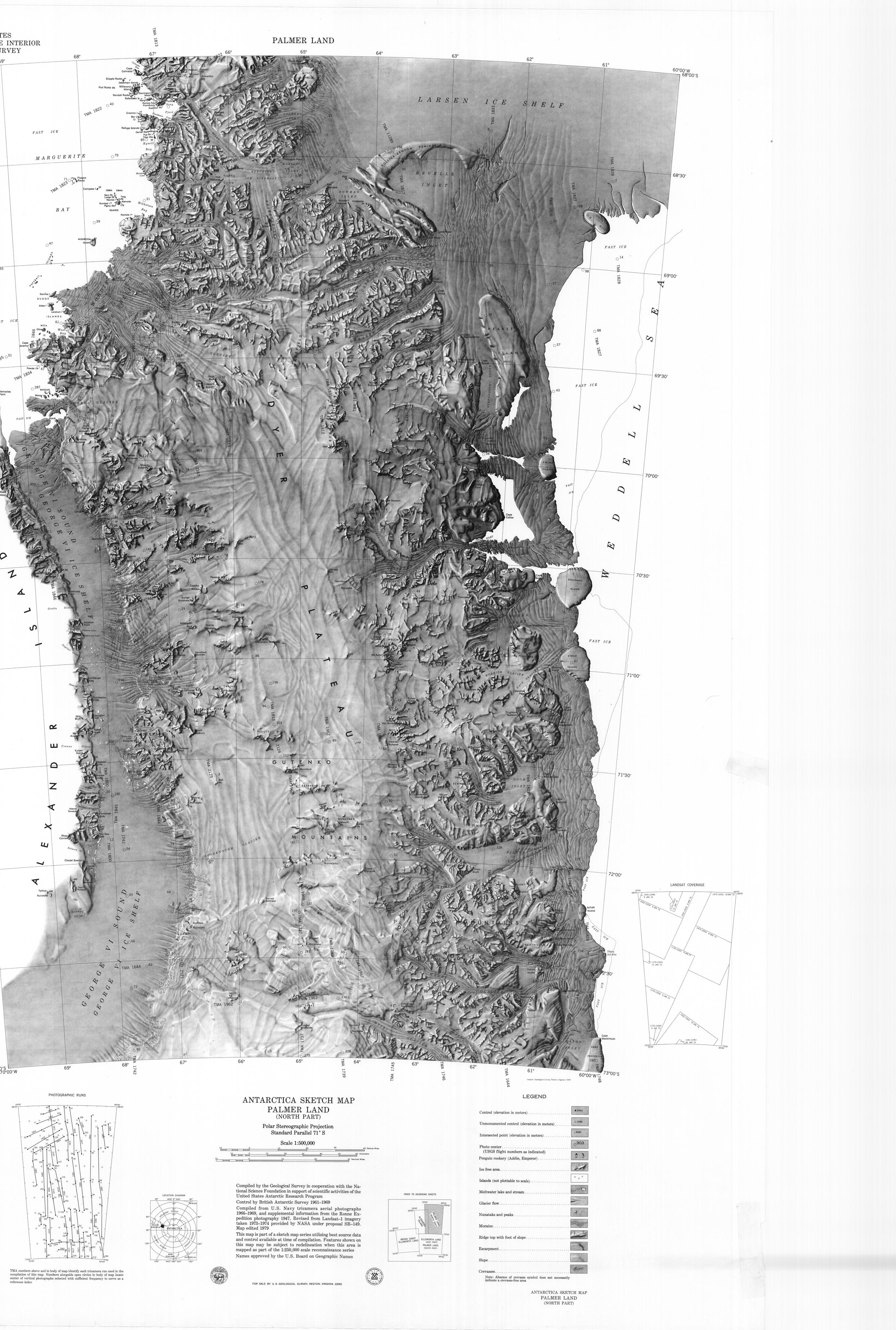
Northern Palmer Land. Scripps Heights northeast of center of map

Scripps Heights are near the Wilkins Coast of northeastern Palmer Land, beside the Weddell Sea to the east. They are southwest of Casey Inlet and northwest of Stefansson Strait. They are northeast of the Eternity Range, east of Wakefield Highland and southeast of Hitchcock Heights. The Lurabee Glacier flows east-northeast along the southeast margin of Scripps Heights to enter the sea south of Casey Inlet. The Casey Glacier flows northeast and then east along the northwest margin of the heights to enter Casey Inlet. Features include Cape Walcott at the eastern end and Hogmanay Pass at the western end.

== Discovery and name ==
Scripps Heights were discovered by Sir Hubert Wilkins in his pioneer flight on December 20, 1928. Thinking the feature to be a large island lying between two great transverse channels which completely severed the Antarctic Peninsula, he named it "Scripps Island" for William Scripps of Detroit, Michigan. Correlation of aerial photographs taken by Lincoln Ellsworth in 1935 and preliminary reports of the findings of the British Graham Land expedition (BGLE) under John Rymill, 1934–37, led W. L. G. Joerg to interpret this to be a peninsula. In published reports, members of the BGLE have concurred in this interpretation which was also borne out by the results of subsequent flights and a sledge trip from East Base by members of the United States Antarctic Service (USAS) in 1940.

== Features ==
=== Cape Walcott ===
69°05′S 63°19′W. A bold, ice-covered headland rising to 625 metres (2,051 ft) high, forming the seaward extremity of Scripps Heights. Discovered by Sir Hubert Wilkins in 1928 and named by him for Frederic C. Walcott of the Council of the American Geographical Society.

=== Hogmanay Pass ===
69°15′S 64°07′W. A pass 1,230 metres (4,040 ft) high, immediately southwest of Scripps Heights, leading from the head of Casey Glacier to the middle of Lurabee Glacier. The feature was first photographed from the air by Lincoln Ellsworth in November 1935, and its southern portion was plotted from these photos by W.L.G. Joerg. It was rephotographed by the USAS, 1940, and by the Ronne Antarctic Research Expedition (RARE), 1947. This pass was used by a Falkland Islands Dependencies Survey (FIDS) survey party in December 1960 and provided a good sledge route. So named because the pass was approached on the last day of 1960, the Scottish feast of Hogmanay.

== Sources ==
- Alberts, Fred G., ed. (1995), Geographic Names of the Antarctic (PDF) (2 ed.), United States Board on Geographic Names This article incorporates public domain material from websites or documents of the United States Board on Geographic Names.
- Palmer Land, USGS: United States Geological Survey

This article incorporates public domain material from websites or documents of the United States Geological Survey.
