= Ewing Island =

Ewing Island may refer to:

- Ewing Island (Antarctica)
- Ewing Island (New Zealand)
