= Hughes Ice Piedmont =

- Location within Antarctica
- Coordinates: 70°12′S 62°15′W

Hughes Ice Piedmont (70°12′S 62°15′W) is the ice piedmont between Cordini Glacier and Smith Inlet on the east coast of Palmer Land, Antarctica.

== Location ==
Hughes Ice Piedmont is on the Wilkins Coast of central Palmer Land, facing the Weddell Sea. It is south of Stefansson Sound and Hearst Island and north of Smith Inlet. It is east of the Columbia Mountains. Features include Cape Collier in the south and Graham Spur in the north. Nearby features include Mount Bailey, Cordini Glacier, James Nunatak and Ewing Island.

== Name ==
Hughes Ice Piedmont' was named by the United States Advisory Committee on Antarctic Names (US-ACAN) for Terence J. Hughes, a United States Antarctic Research Program (USARP) glaciologist at Deception Island and McMurdo Sound during 1970–71, and at Deception Island, 1973–74.

== Features ==
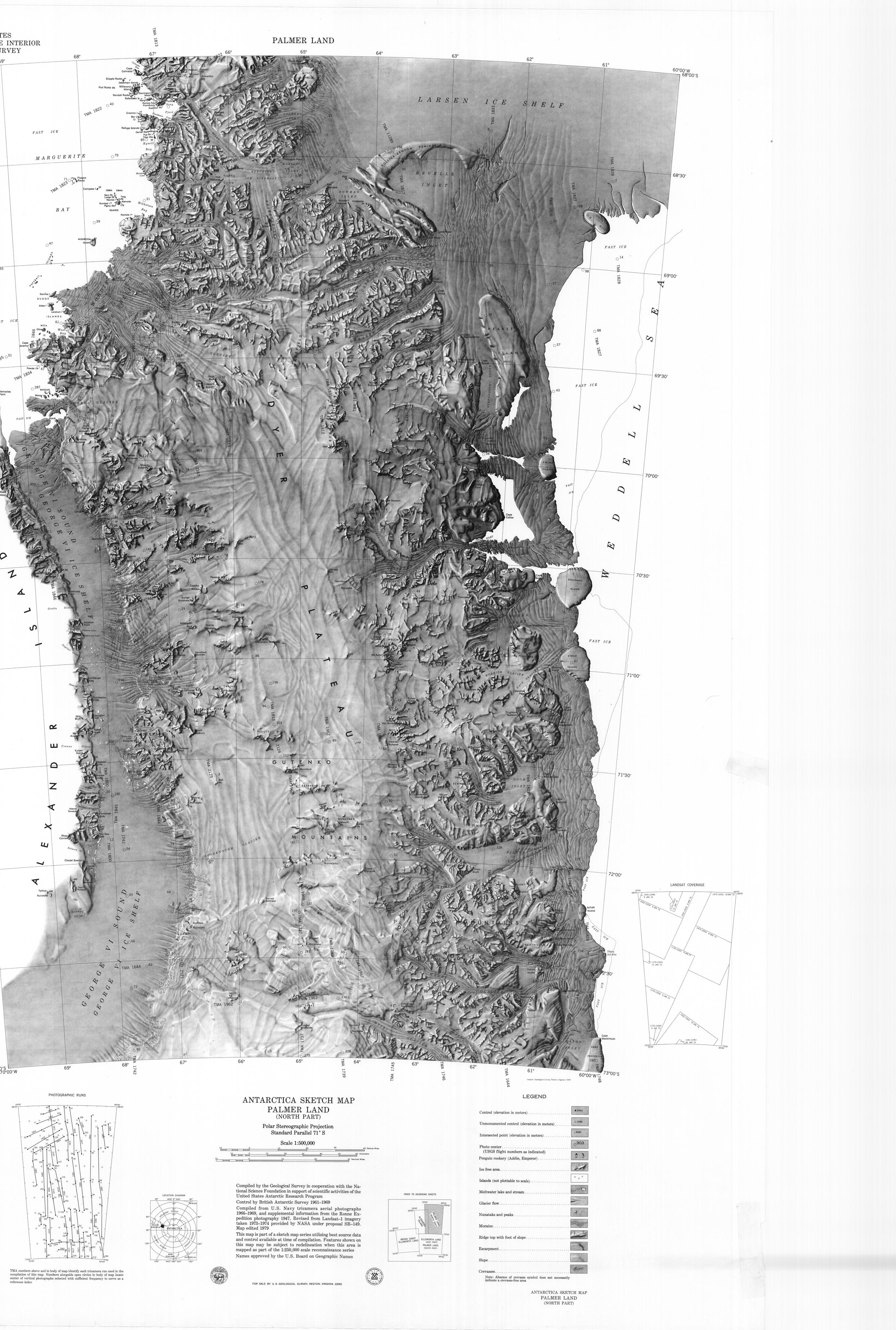
Northern Palmer Land. Columbia Mountains upper center of map

Features and nearby features include;

=== Cape Collier ===
70°10′S 61°54′W. Broad ice-covered cape on the east coast of Palmer Land, about midway between the south end of Hearst Island and Cape Boggs. Discovered in 1940 by members of the United States Antarctic Service (USAS) who explored this coast by land and from the air from East Base. Named for Zadick Collier, machinist at the East Base.

=== Graham Spur ===
70°06′S 62°30′W. A mostly ice-covered spur, but with prominent bare rock exposures at the tip and near its center, located on the northwest side of Hughes Ice Piedmont, 6 nautical miles (11 km; 6.9 mi) south of James Nunatak. Mapped by the United States Geological Survey (USGS) in 1974. Named by the US-ACAN for William L. Graham, USARP biologist and Station Scientific Leader at Palmer Station in 1972.

=== Mount Bailey ===
70°00′S 63°13′W. A mountain, 1,445 metres (4,741 ft) high, which stands south of Anthony Glacier and 6 nautical miles (11 km; 6.9 mi) west-southwest of Lewis Point. Charted in 1936-37 by a British Graham Land Expedition (BGLE) sledge party under John Rymill. It was recharted in 1947 by a joint sledge party consisting of members of the Ronne Antarctic Research Expedition (RARE) under Finn Ronne, and the Falkland Islands Dependencies Survey (FIDS). Named by Ronne for Commander Clay W. Bailey, United States Navy, member of the Byrd Antarctic Expedition (ByrdAE), 1933-35, and the West Base party of the USAS, 1939-41, who assisted in outlining the RARE radio requirements.

=== Lewis Point ===
69°54′S 62°25′W. A point marked by rocky exposures on its north side and surmounted by an ice-covered dome, 510 metres (1,670 ft) high, standing at the south side of the mouth of Anthony Glacier. Photographed from the air by the USAS in 1940. During 1947 it was photographed from the air by the RARE under Ronne, who in conjunction with the FIDS charted it from the ground. Named by Ronne for Colonel Richard L. Lewis of the Army Quartermaster Corps, which furnished field equipment and clothing to the RARE for testing purposes.

=== Cordini Glacier ===
70°01′S 62°30′W. A broad glacier that drains the Mount Bailey vicinity and flows between Lewis Point and James Nunatak to the east coast of Palmer Land. Named by US-ACAN after Argentine scientist I. Rafael Cordini, author of reports on the geology and ice of the Antarctic Peninsula and Weddell Sea region.

=== James Nunatak ===
69°59′S 62°27′W. A conical nunatak, 410 metres (1,350 ft) high, standing 5.5 nautical miles (10.2 km; 6.3 mi) south of Lewis Point on the east coast of Palmer Land. This feature was photographed from the air by members of the US AS in September 1940 and was probably seen by the USAS ground party that explored this coast. During 1947 it was charted by a joint party consisting of members of the RARE and FIDS. Named by the FIDS for David P. James, FIDS surveyor at the Hope Bay base in 1945-46.

=== Ewing Island ===
69°54′S 61°13′W. An ice-covered, dome-shaped island 8 nautical miles (15 km; 9.2 mi) in diameter, lying 15 nautical miles (28 km; 17 mi) northeast of Cape Collier. Discovered from the air on November 7, 1947 by RARE, under Ronne, who named it for Doctor Maurice Ewing of Columbia University, who assisted in planning the RARE seismological program.

== Sources ==
- Alberts, Fred G., ed. (1995), Geographic Names of the Antarctic (PDF) (2 ed.), United States Board on Geographic Names This article incorporates public domain material from websites or documents of the United States Board on Geographic Names.
- Palmer Land, USGS: United States Geological Survey

This article incorporates public domain material from websites or documents of the United States Geological Survey.
