= Mobiloil Inlet =

Inlet on the eastern coast of the Antarctic Peninsula

- Location within Antarctica
- Location: Bowman Coast, Antarctic Peninsula, Antarctica
- Coordinates: 68°35′S 64°45′W
- Type: Inlet
- Ocean/sea sources: Weddell Sea

Mobiloil Inlet (68°35′S 64°45′W) is an ice-filled inlet, nurtured by several northeast and east flowing glaciers, lying between the Rock Pile Peaks and Hollick-Kenyon Peninsula (Note: Alberts (1995) does not always distinguish Bowman Inlet (named after 1969) from Mobiloil Inlet, although the two are clearly distinct in the 1979 version of the USGS map of the region. For example, the map shows Crabeater Point in the southeast of Bowman Inlet, but Alberts (1995) says Crabeater Point is in the southeast extremity of Mobiloil Inlet. Probably the definitions were not updated when Bowman Inlet was identified and named as a separate feature. This article follows the map and describes only those features to the west of Bowman Inlet.) along the east coast of the Antarctic Peninsula.

== Location ==
Location of Bowman Coast on Antarctic Peninsula. Mobiloil Inlet in the east

Mobiloil Inlet is near the east end of the Bowman Coast of Graham Land on the Antarctic Peninsula, opening onto the Weddell Sea to the north. Bowman Inlet and the Hollick-Kenyon Peninsula are to the east. Bermel Peninsula and the Solberg Inlet is to the north. The Morgan Upland is to the southwest, the Godfrey Upland is to the west and the Hadley Upland is to the northwest.

The entrance to the inlet is between the Rock Pile Point to the north and Yates Spur to the south. The west of the inlet is filled by the Mercator Ice Piedmont and the Traffic Circle. Glaciers feeding the piedmont include, clockwise from the south, Weyerhaeuser Glacier, which is fed by Hermes Glacier from the east and by Sumner Glacier from the west, Cole Glacier, and Lammers Glacier. Other features include Werner Peak, Norwood Scarp, Mount Solus, Eisner Peak and Mount Blunt.

== Discovery and name ==
Mobiloil Inlet was discovered by Sir Hubert Wilkins in a flight on 20 December 1928, and named by him after a product of the Vacuum Oil Company of Australia.

== Glaciers ==
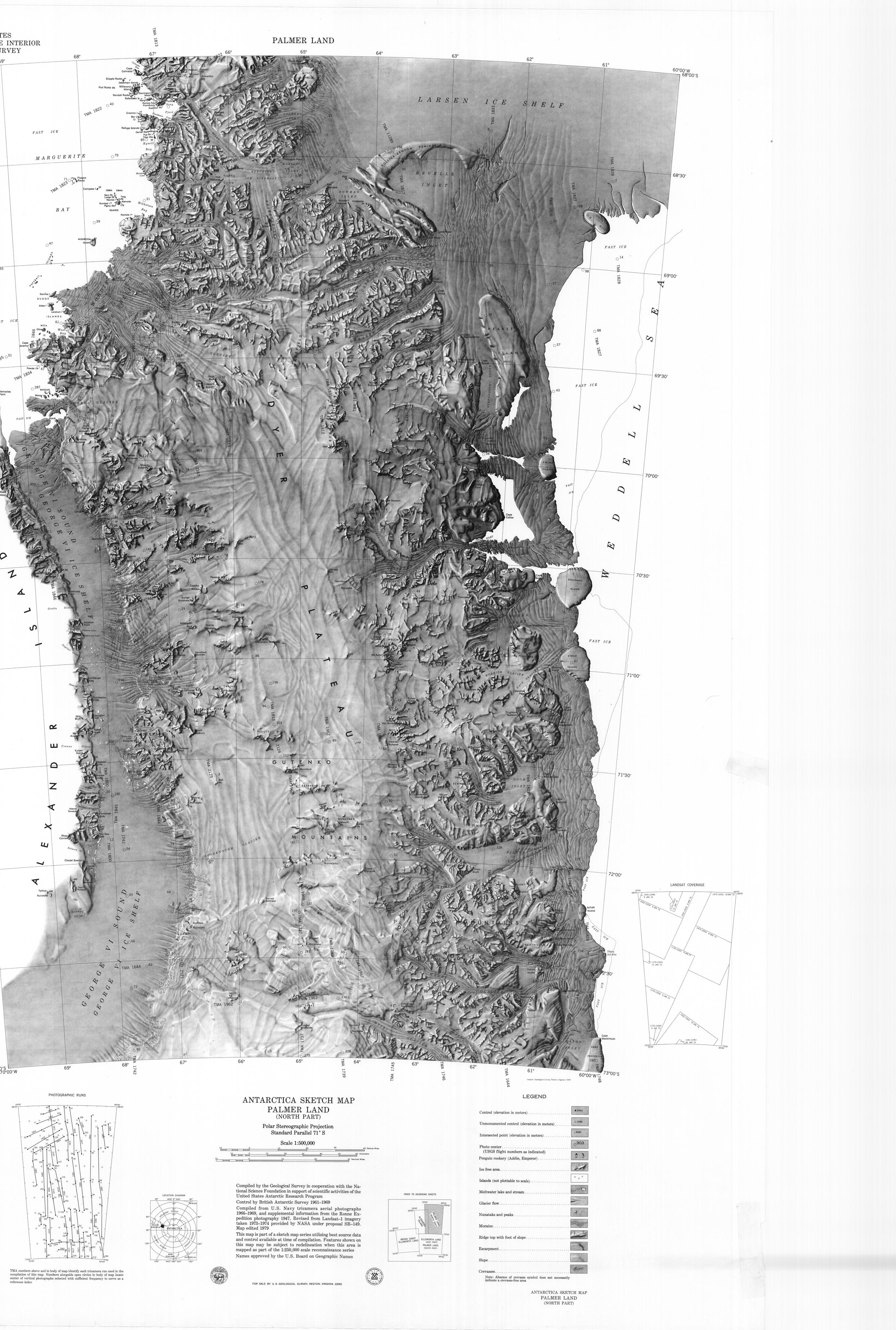
Northern Palmer Land. Mobiloil Inlet in northeast of map

=== Mercator Ice Piedmont ===
68°37′S 65°30′W. A gently-sloping ice piedmont at the head of Mobiloil Inlet, formed by the confluence of the Gibbs, Lammers, Cole and Weyerhaeuser Glaciers. The feature was first photographed from the air by Lincoln Ellsworth in November 1935, and was plotted from these photos by W. L. G. Joerg as the lower end of a "major valley depression" along the coast. First seen from the ground by Finn Ronne and C.R. Eklund of USAS, 1939–41, which also obtained air photos. Surveyed by the Falkland Islands Dependencies Survey (FIDS) in December 1958. Named by the UK Antarctic Place-Names Committee (UK-APC) after Gerardus Mercator (1512–94), Flemish mathematician and geographer, originator of the map projection which bears his name, 1568.

=== Traffic Circle ===
68°37′S 66°00′W. A glacier-filled expanse 500 metres (1,600 ft) high, situated south of Mount Ptolemy and medially on the Antarctic Peninsula between Marguerite Bay and Mobiloil Inlet. Hub Nunatak rises from the center of the Traffic Circle. From this position, five glacial troughs radiate like the spokes of a wheel. (Note: The description in Alberts (1995) of five glacial troughs radiating from Traffic Circle agrees with the map, and they do provide routes to the west of the Antarctic Peninsula, but as their feature descriptions make clear, Weyerhaeuser Glacier, Cole Glacier, Lammers Glacier flow into the Traffic Circle, which feeds the Mercator Ice Piedmont. A trough leads to Gibbs Glacier, which also feeds the Mercator Ice Piedment.) One connects on the north with Gibbs Glacier and Neny Glacier, leading to Neny Fjord. Another connects on the west with Lammers Glacier and Windy Valley, leading to Mikkelsen Bay. A third, Cole Glacier, trends southwest along Godfrey Upland toward the Wordie Ice Shelf area. The fourth, Weyerhaeuser Glacier, trends southward toward Wakefield Highland and connects with glaciers leading westward to Wordie Ice Shelf. The fifth, Mercator Ice Piedmont, is nourished by the outflow from Weyerhaeuser, Cole and Gibbs Glaciers; it broadens as it descends eastward to the head of Mobiloil Inlet. Discovered in 1940 by members of the East Base party of the United States Antarctic Service (USAS), 1939–41, who used this system of troughs in traveling across the upland, hence the name Traffic Circle.

=== Weyerhaeuser Glacier ===
68°45′S 65°32′W. Large glacier flowing north into Mercator Ice Piedmont close west of Mobiloil Inlet. This glacier lies in the area first explored from the air by Sir Hubert Wilkins in 1928 and Lincoln Ellsworth in 1935, but it was first clearly delineated in aerial photographs taken by the USAS in 1940. The glacier was resighted in 1947 by the Ronne Antarctic Research Expedition (RARE) under Finn Ronne. He named it for F.K. Weyerhaeuser of the Weyerhaeuser Lumber Co. who contributed lumber and insulating material to the expedition.

=== Hermes Glacier ===
68°59′S 65°15′W. A glacier 8 nautical miles (15 km; 9.2 mi) long, flowing west into Weyerhaeuser Glacier in northern Graham Land. Surveyed in January 1960 by FIDS who discovered the glacier after several fruitless attempts to find a route out of the mountains east of Earnshaw Glacier. It provided an ideal "road" back to known country and was therefore named after Hermes, the god of roads in Greek mythology. This name by UK-APC initiated the idea of naming other features in this area after Greek gods.

=== Sumner Glacier ===
68°53′S 65°40′W. A short, broad tributary glacier that flows northeast into the lower reaches of Weyerhaeuser Glacier, close west of Mount Solus. Sketched from the air by D.P. Mason of FIDS in August 1947. The lower reaches only were surveyed from the ground by FIDS in December 1958. Named by UK-APC after Thomas Hubbard Sumner (1807–76), American sailor who, in 1837, introduced the position line method of navigation, since developed into standard practice at sea and in the air.

=== Cole Glacier ===
68°42′S 66°06′W. A glacier on the east side of Godfrey Upland, 11 nautical miles (20 km; 13 mi) long, flowing north-northeast into the Traffic Circle. First seen by USAS in 1940, but not named. Roughly surveyed by FIDS in 1958. Named by UK-APC after Humphrey Cole (c. 1530–91), the most famous English instrument maker of Elizabethan times, who pioneered the design of portable navigation instruments and equipped Martin Frobisher's expeditions.

=== Lammers Glacier ===
68°37′S 66°10′W. Large glacier flowing east along the north side of Godfrey Upland into the Traffic Circle and Mercator Ice Piedmont. This glacier appears indistinctly in an aerial photograph taken by Sir Hubert Wilkins on 20 December 1928, but shows more clearly in aerial photographs taken by Lincoln Ellsworth in 1935 and the USAS in 1940. It was resighted in 1947 by the RARE under Finn Ronne, who named it for Lester Lammers, contributor of nine grown husky dogs and four puppies to the expedition.

=== Gibbs Glacier ===
68°28′S 66°00′W. A glacier, 15 nautical miles (28 km; 17 mi) long, flowing southeast into the north part of Mercator Ice Piedmont. This feature together with Neny Glacier, which flows northwest, occupy a transverse depression between Mercator Ice Piedmont and Neny Fjord on the west side of Antarctic Peninsula. Gibbs Glacier was photographed from the air and first mapped by the USAS, 1939–41, and RARE, 1947–48. Named by UK-APC for Peter M. Gibbs of FIDS, surveyor at Horseshoe Island, 1957, and leader at Stonington Island, 1958, who was responsible (with P. Forster) for the first ground survey of the glacier.

== Other features ==
=== Yates Spur ===
68°41′S 64°57′W. A prominent rock spur on the south side of Mobiloil Inlet, at the west side of the terminus of Earnshaw Glacier. The spur was photographed from the air by Lincoln Ellsworth, 1935, USAS, 1940, and RARE, 1947, and was surveyed by FIDS, 1958. Named by the United States Advisory Committee on Antarctic Names (US-ACAN) in 1977 after D. Kent Yates, Applied Research Laboratories, University of Texas, a member of the United States Geological Survey (USGS) satellite surveying team at Palmer Station, winter party 1973.

=== Werner Peak ===
68°43′S 65°14′W. The highest 1,550 metres (5,090 ft) high and most conspicuous peak on the southeast side of Mercator Ice Piedmont. The peak rises just east of the north end of Norwood Scarp. A steep rock ridge on its north side is easily recognizable from any point on the ice piedmont. Photographed from the air by the USAS on 28 September 1940. Surveyed by FIDS in 1958. Named by UK-APC after Johannes Werner (1468–1528), German astronomer and mathematician who probably first (1514) suggested the method of lunar distances for determining longitude.

=== Norwood Scarp ===
68°50′S 65°23′W. A well-defined escarpment, 11 nautical miles (20 km; 13 mi) long and rising to 1,525 metres (5,003 ft) high, forming part of the east flank of Weyerhaeuser Glacier. Photographed from the air by the USAS on 28 September 1940, and by FIDS, 14 August 1947. Roughly surveyed by FIDS in December 1958 and November 1960. Named by UK-APC after Richard Norwood (1590–1675), English mathematician who expounded the advantages of great-circle sailing and who, in 1635, measured an arc of meridian in order to improve the practice of navigation.

=== Mount Solus ===
68°50′S 65°33′W. A conspicuous, isolated mountain 1,290 metres (4,230 ft) high in the center and near the mouth of Weyerhaeuser Glacier. It has steep rock sides meeting in a sharp summit ridge. Photographed from the air by FIDS in August 1947, and by RARE (Trimetrogon photography) in December 1947. Surveyed by FIDS in December 1958. The UK-APC name is descriptive of the isolated position of the feature.

=== Eisner Peak ===
68°50′S 65°45′W. A peak rising to 1,525 metres (5,003 ft) high at the west side of the terminus of Sumner Glacier, 2 nautical miles (3.7 km; 2.3 mi) south-southeast of Mount Blunt. The peak was photographed from the air by the RARE, 1947, and United States Navy, 1966, and was surveyed from the ground by FIDS, 1960–61. Named in 1977 by US-ACAN for Glen Eisner, United States Antarctic Research Program (USARP) biologist, Palmer Station, 1975.

=== Mount Blunt ===
68°48′S 65°48′W. A rounded ice-covered mountain 1,500 metres (4,900 ft) high rising from the west flank of Weyerhaeuser Glacier. The mountain was photographed from the air by the USAS on 28 September 1940. It was roughly surveyed by FIDS in December 1958, and resurveyed in November 1960. Named by UK-APC after Edmund Blunt (1770–1862), American publisher of charts and sailing directions, whose establishment was acquired by United States Government to form the nucleus of the United States Hydrographic Office (since 1972, the Defense Mapping Agency Hydrographic Center).

=== Hub Nunatak ===
68°37′S 66°05′W. A beehive-shaped nunatak in the lower part of Lammers Glacier. The feature is conspicuously located near the center of the Traffic Circle, a glacial depression which is notable for the series of prominent glaciers which flow toward, or emanate from it in a radial pattern. Discovered in 1940 by members of the East Base party of the United States Antarctic Service, 1939–41, who so named the nunatak because of its unique location in the Traffic Circle.

== Sources ==
- Alberts, Fred G., ed. (1995), Geographic Names of the Antarctic (PDF) (2 ed.), United States Board on Geographic Names This article incorporates public domain material from websites or documents of the United States Board on Geographic Names.
- Palmer Land, USGS: United States Geological Survey

This article incorporates public domain material from websites or documents of the United States Geological Survey.
