= LeFeuvre Scarp =

LeFeuvre Scarp (69°21′S 63°18′W) is an irregular cliff-like elevation, 750 metres (2,460 ft) high, situated 11 nautical miles (20 km) west of Cape Reichelderfer on the east side of Palmer Land, Antarctica, and 45km West of Hearst Island. It marks the north side of the divide between Bingham Glacier and a smaller unnamed glacier next northward. The feature was photographed from the air by Lincoln Ellsworth in 1935, the United States Antarctic Service in 1940, and the Ronne Antarctic Research Expedition in 1947, and was surveyed by the Falkland Islands Dependencies Survey in 1947. It was named by the UK Antarctic Place-Names Committee in 1962 after Charles F. LeFeuvre, a radio operator at Brunt Ice Shelf in 1956, Signy Island in 1959, and Horseshoe Island and Stonington Island in 1960.
