= Mount McAllister =

Mountain in Graham Land, Antarctica

Mount McAllister (68°44′S 65°54′W) is a mountain rising to 1,975 metres (6,480 ft) on the west side of Weyerhaeuser Glacier, 4 nautical miles (7 km) northwest of Mount Blunt in the east of the Antarctic Peninsula. The peak was photographed from the air by the United States Antarctic Service, 1940, the Ronne Antarctic Research Expedition, 1947, the U.S. Navy, 1966, and was surveyed by the Falkland Islands Dependencies Survey, 1958–61. It was named by the Advisory Committee on Antarctic Names in 1977 for Lieutenant R.M. McAllister, United States Coast Guard, Operations Officer on USCGC Burton Island during U.S. Navy Operation Deep Freeze, 1975 and 1976.
