= Petrus Bertius =

Flemish philosopher, theologian and historian

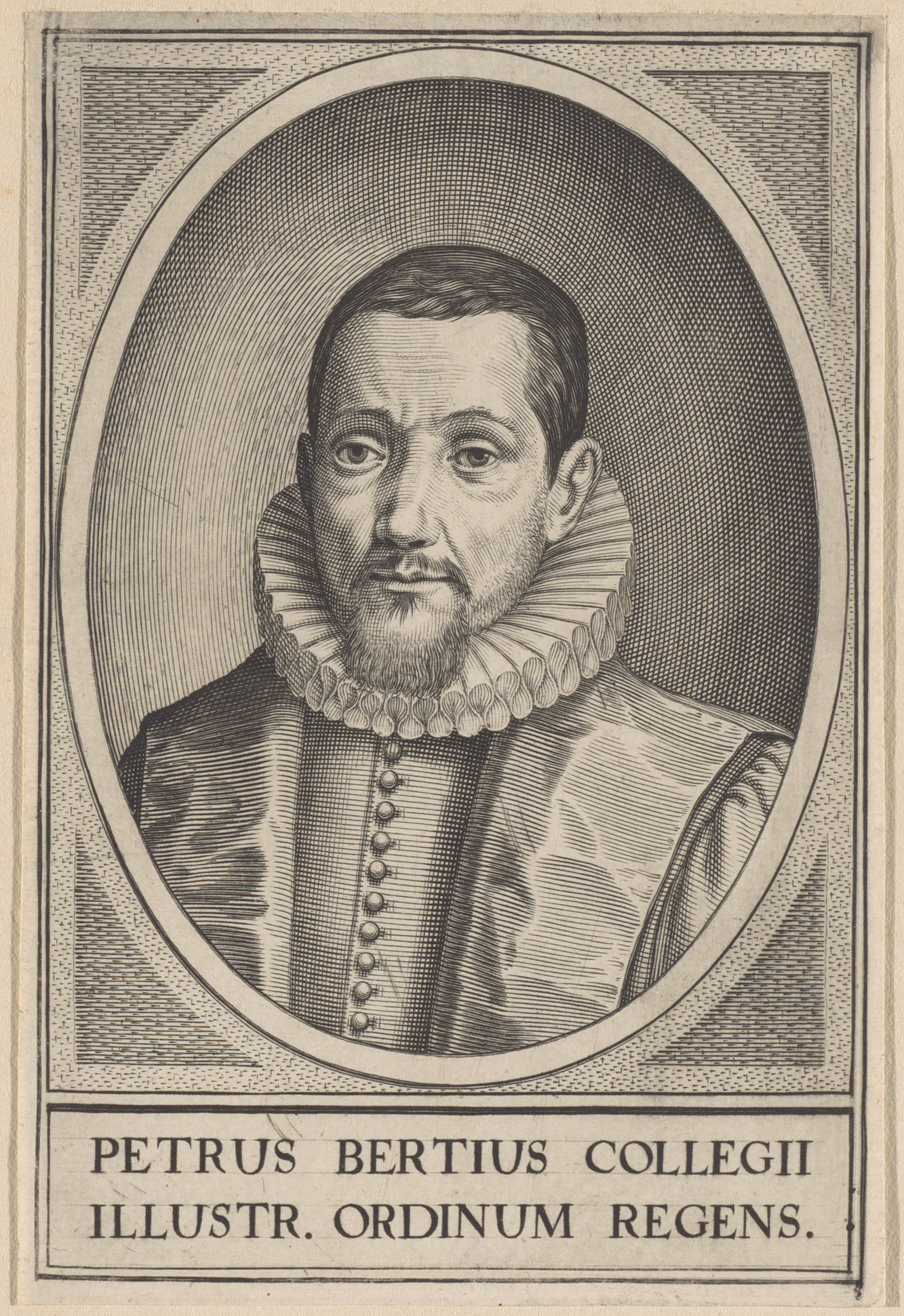
Petrus Bertius, engraving by Willem Isaacsz. van Swanenburg.

Petrus Bertius (also Peter Bertius; (in Dutch) Pieter de Bert) (14 November 1565 – 13 October 1629) was a Flemish philosopher, theologian, historian, geographer and cartographer. Bertius published much in mathematics, and historical and theological works, but he is now best known as a cartographer with his edition of the Geographia of Ptolemy, which includes Mercator's Ptolemaic atlas from 1578 as well as parallel Greek and Latin texts.

== Early life ==
He was born in Beveren (Alveringem), the son of a Flemish preacher Pieter Michielszoon Bardt, who left Flanders for religious exile in London around 1568, with his family. In 1577 Petrus Bertius returned to the Netherlands, to study at the University of Leiden. He supported himself by tutoring younger students and continued travelling in Europe. In 1593 he was appointed to subregent of the Leiden Statencollege, marrying in the same year Maritgen, daughter of Johannes Kuchlinus, the first regent of the Statencollege, whom he would succeed after his death in 1606 as a regent. He was also connected by marriage to Jodocus Hondius and Pieter van den Keere, his brothers-in-law and both cartographers, and this would influence his later life.

== Philosophy & theology ==
Bertius wrote an introduction to Boethius's Consolations of Philosophy, which was published in Giovanni Antonio Volpi's edition of the text in 1721.

Bertius was a friend of Jacobus Arminius, and spoke at his funeral in 1609. A controversy arose with Francis Gomarus, the chief opponent of Arminianism, on the basis of the published version of the funeral oration. Bertius held views on essential doctrines that were unwelcome even to his friends. He was accused of Semipelagianism.

In 1612 Bertius published Hymenaeus desertor, a Latin work that went further than Arminius in theology, against the advice of fellow Remonstrants. The Hymenaeus desertor was widely circulated, but was unpopular: William Louis, Count of Nassau-Dillenburg disliked it, and Johan van Oldenbarnevelt with other politicians felt that Bertius had gone against them. Bertius persisted, however, in 1613 with a Dutch translation, which he reprinted in 1615 in Leiden. Eventually Bertius lost his teaching position, and was also forbidden to give private lessons.

== Later life ==
In 1618 Bertius was given an appointment as a cosmographer to the court of Louis XIII. His career in cartography had started in 1598, with the publication of a Latin edition of a miniature atlas Caert Thresoor by Barent Langenes, which he translated as Tabulae contractae (1600). His Theatrum geographiae veteris had commended him to King Louis. When his academic prospects in the Netherlands were cut down, he went to France.

In 1620 he converted to the Catholic Church, and became professor of rhetoric at the Collège de Boncourt, a part of the University of Paris. In 1622 Louis XIII set up a new personal chair in mathematical sciences in the royal college for Bertius, and granted him the title of royal historian. He died in Paris.

== Works ==
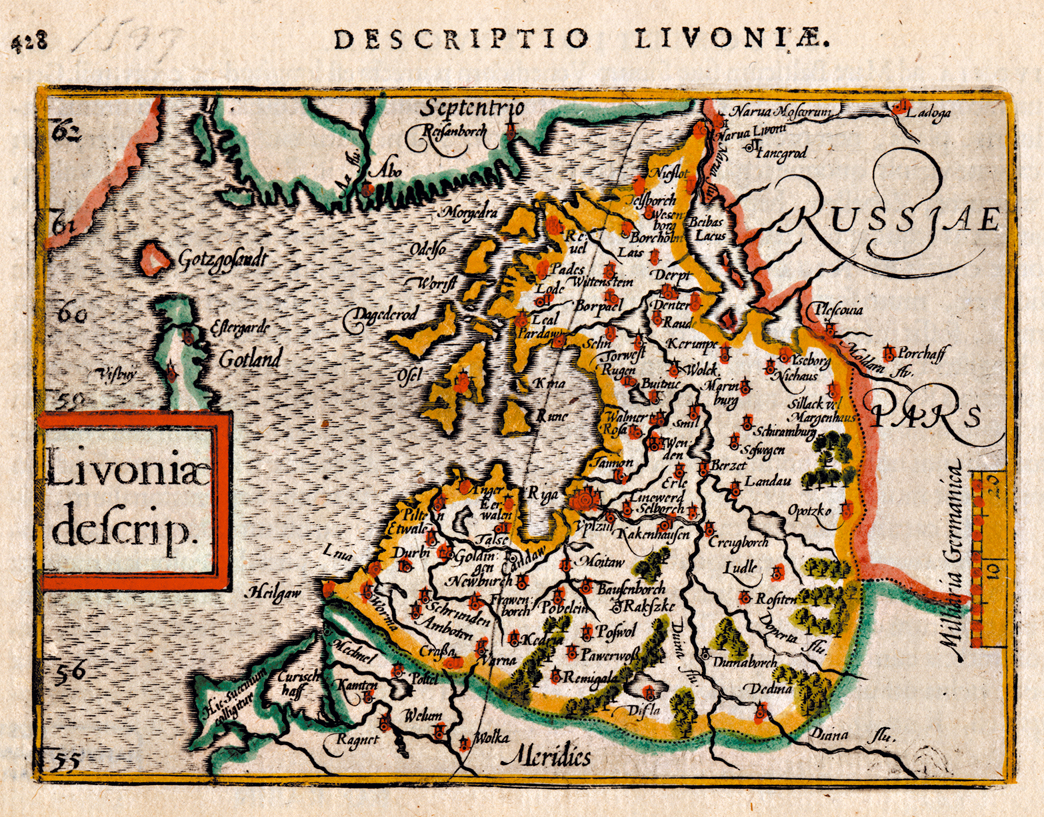
Map of Livonia (1603) from Petrus Bertius, Tabularum Geographicarum Contractarum.

- 1609: Liick-oratie over de doot van den Eerweerdighen ende wytberoemden Heere Jacobus Arminius
- 1612: Hymenaeus desertor: sive de sanctorum apostasia problemata duo. (1: An fieri possit ut justus deserat justitam suam? 2: An quae deseritur fuerit vera justitia?)
- 1616: Commentariorum Rerum Germanicarum libri tres, including commentary on the Tabula Peutingeriana
- 1619: Theatri Geographiae Veteris, doi:10.3931/e-rara-85904 (Digitized Edition at E-rara).
- 1625: Notitia Chorographica Episcopatuum Galliae

== Honours ==
Bertius Inlet in Antarctica is named after Petrus Bertius.

== Notes and references ==
=== Sources ===
- Nellen, Henk J.M. (2015). Hugo Grotius: A Lifelong Struggle for Peace in Church and State, 1583 – 1645. Leiden: Brill.
- Webster, Robert (2015). Perfecting Perfection: Essays in Honor of Henry D. Rack. Eugene, OR: Pickwick Publications.

== Gallery ==
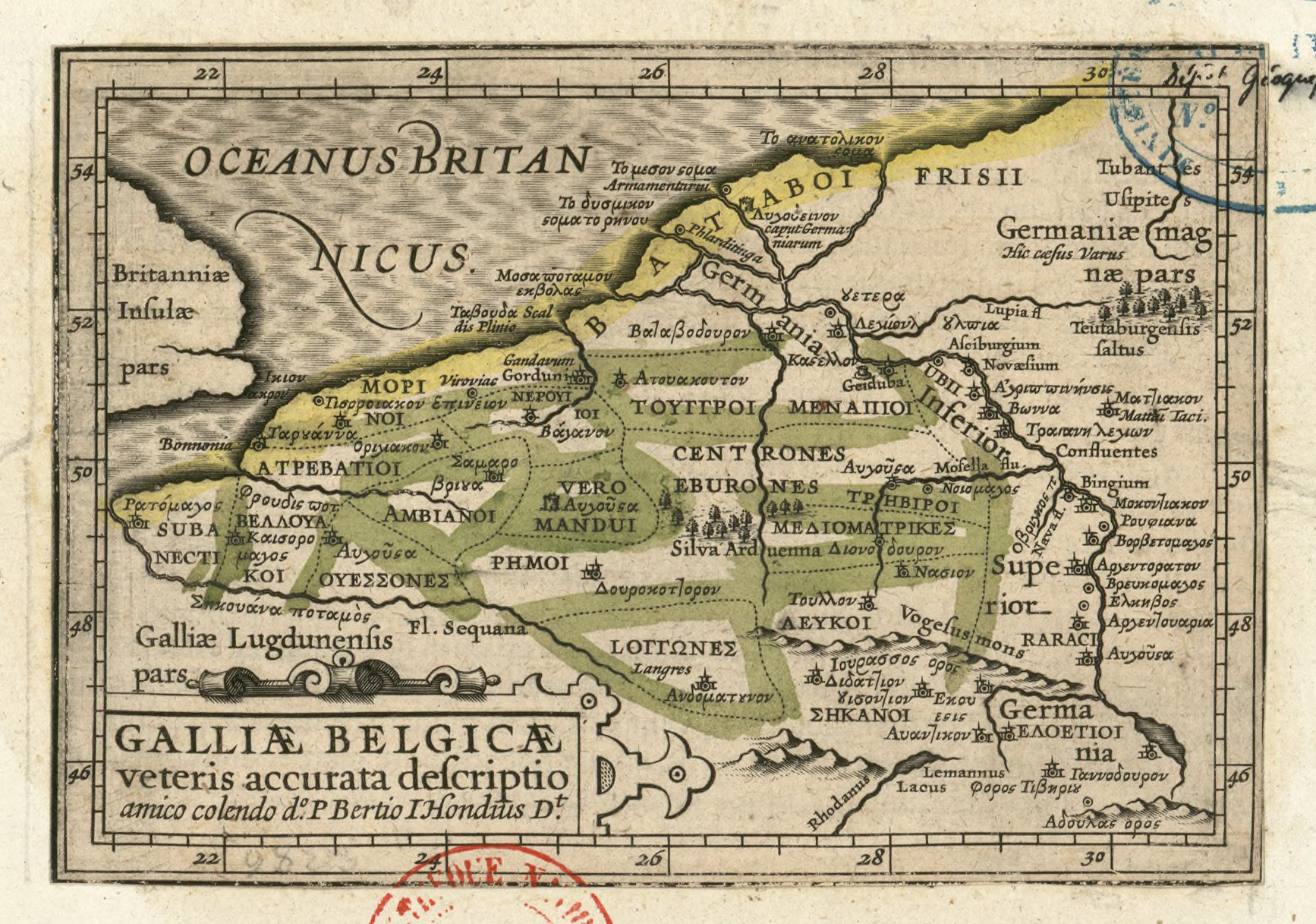
Galliae Belgicae Veteris

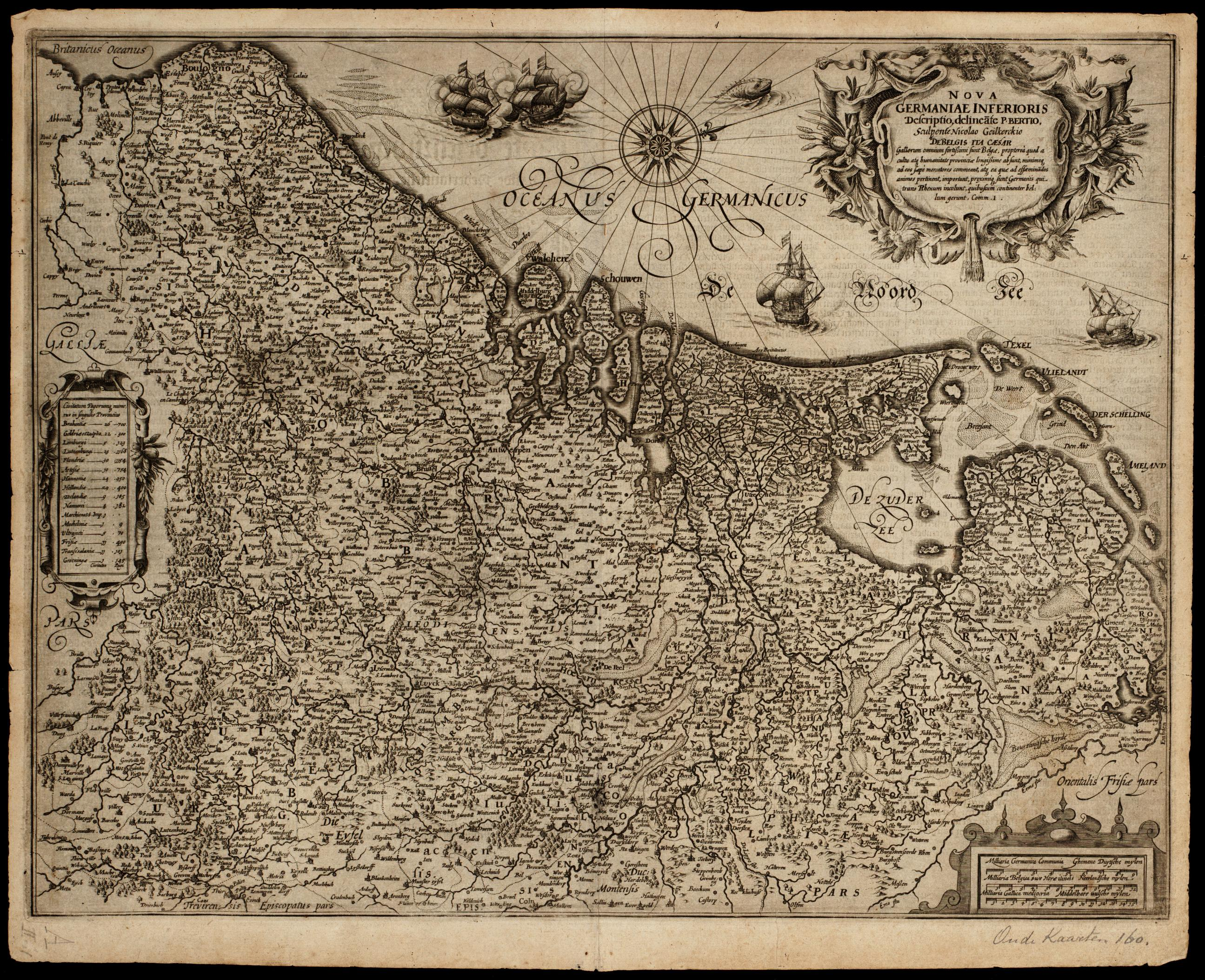
Nova Germaniae Inferioris

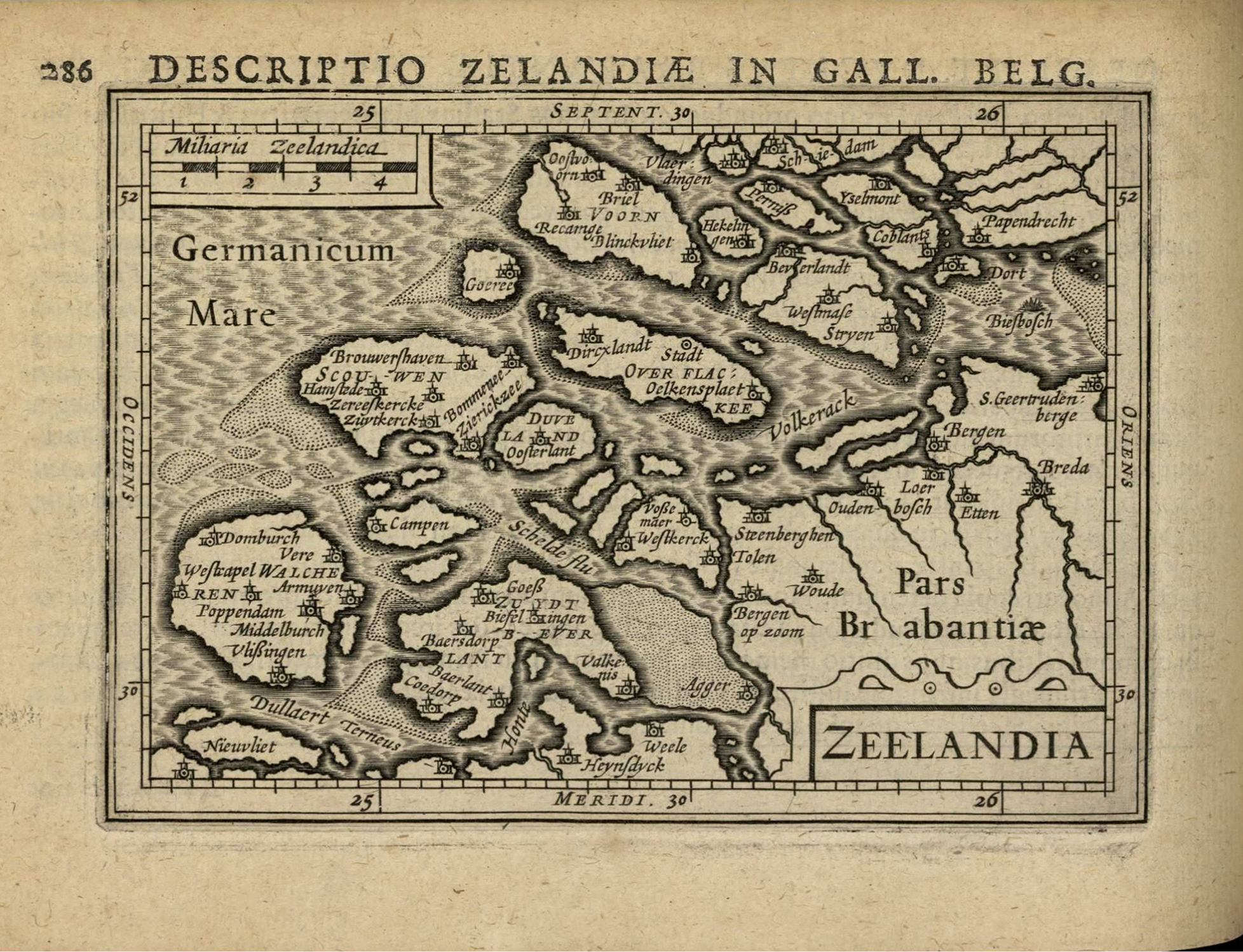
Zeelandia

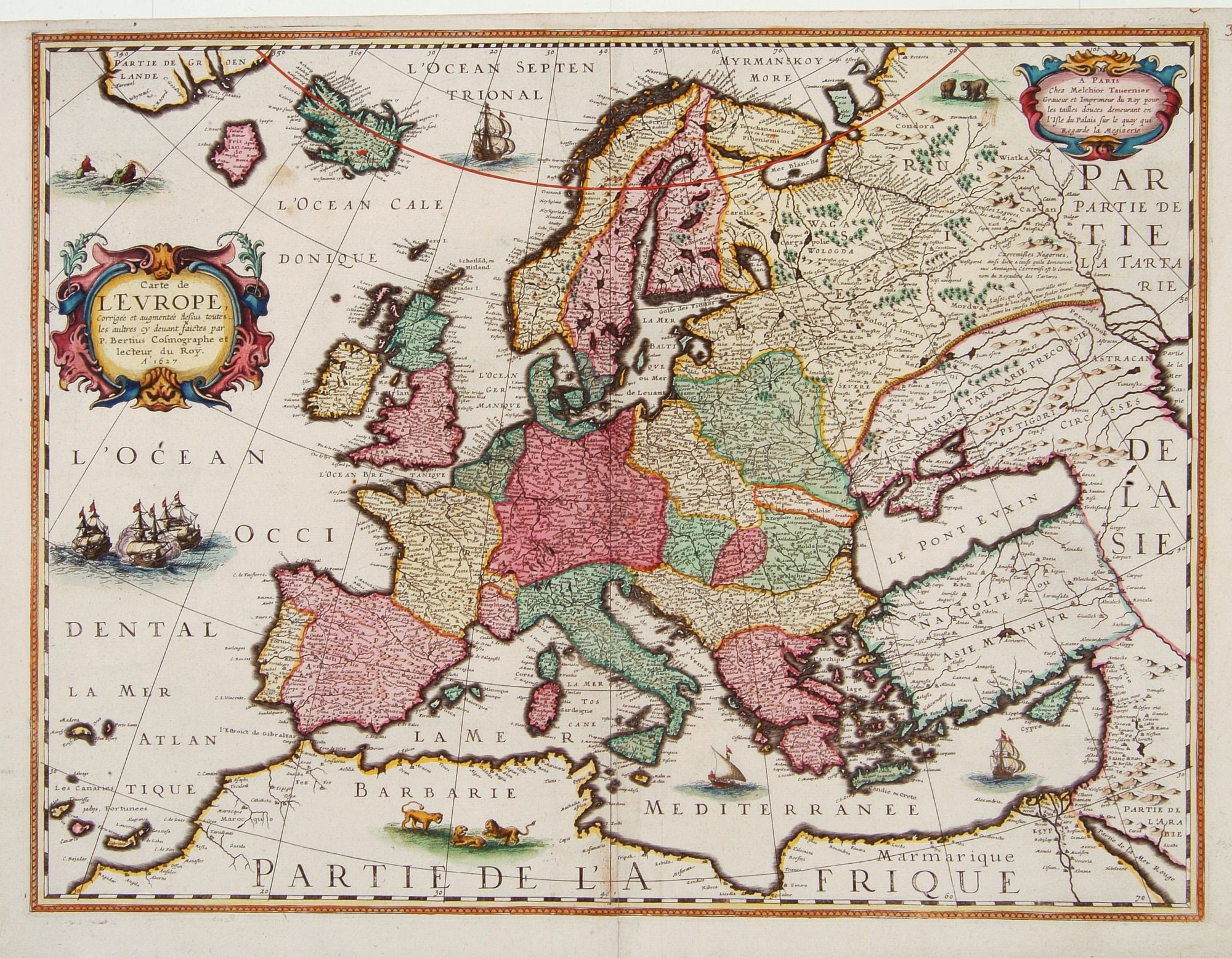
Carte de l'Europe

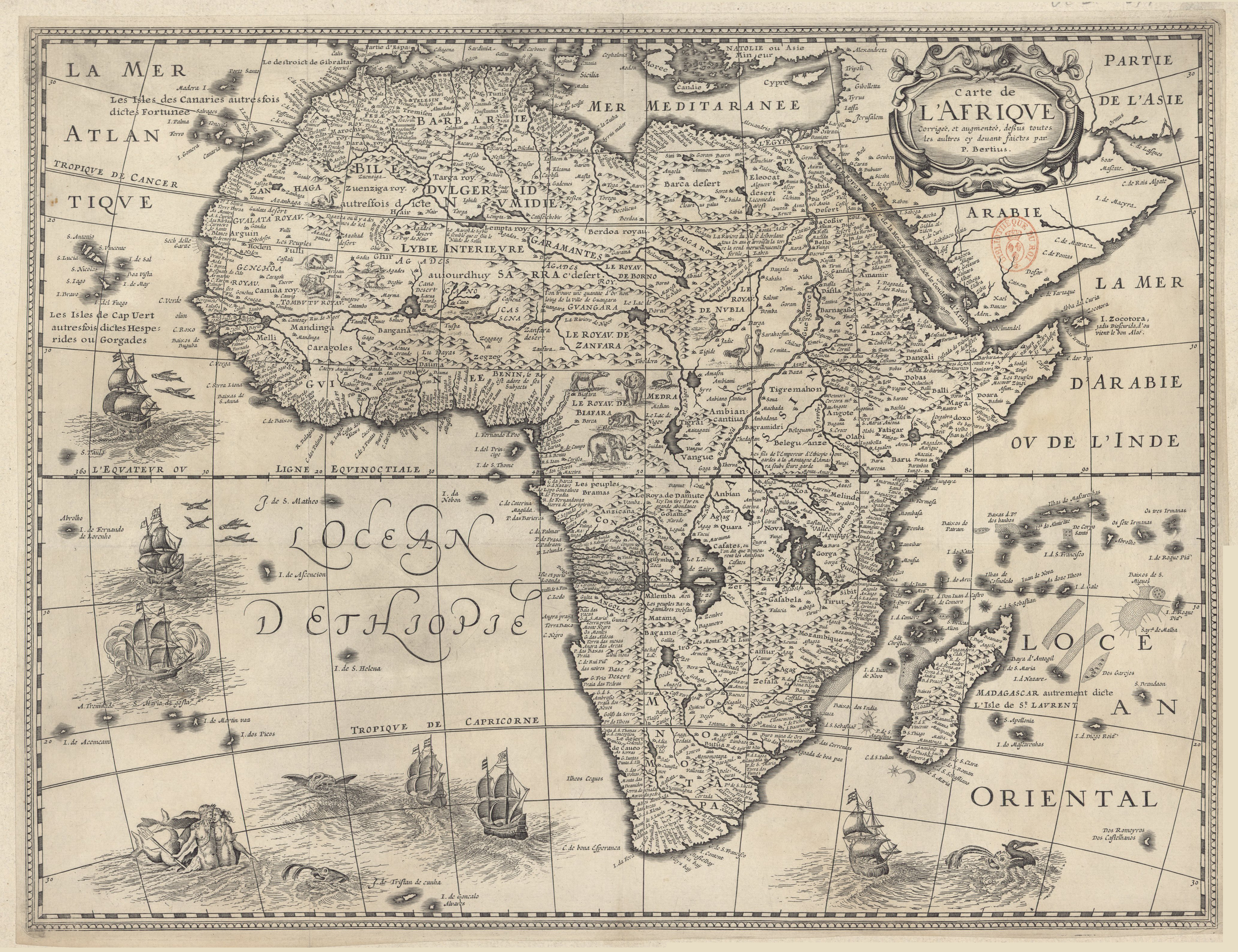
Carte de l'Afrique

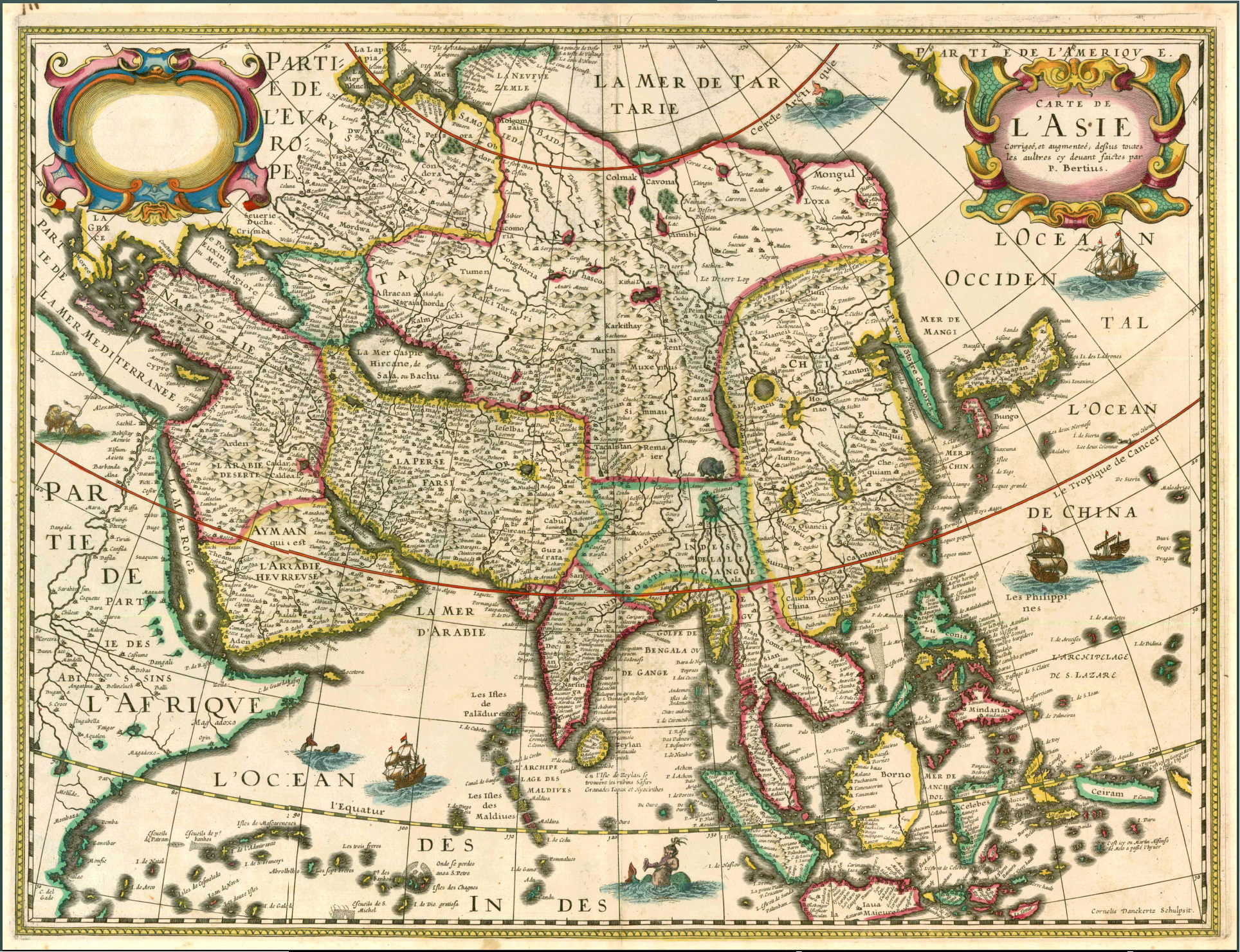
Carte de l'Asie

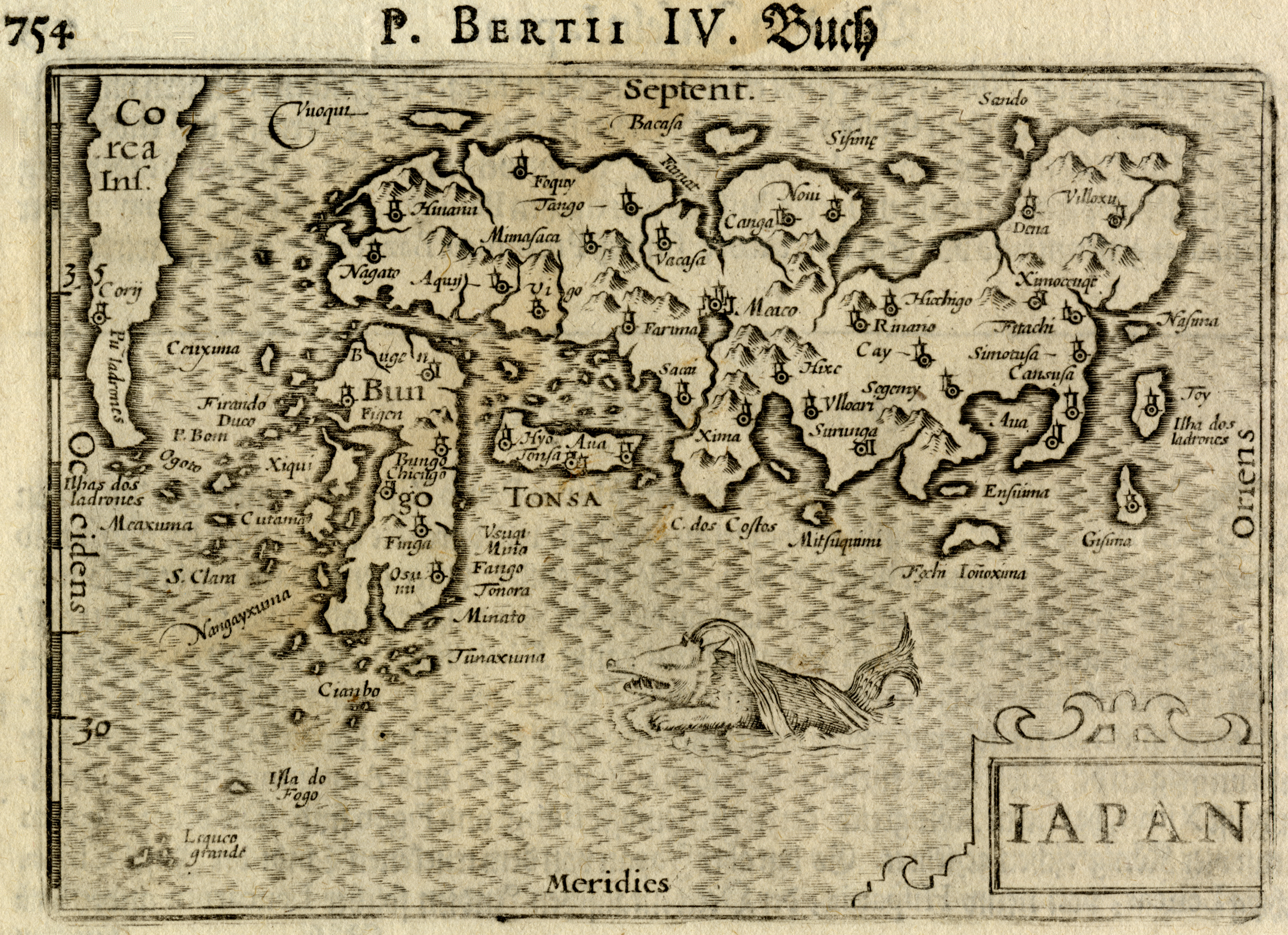
Iapan

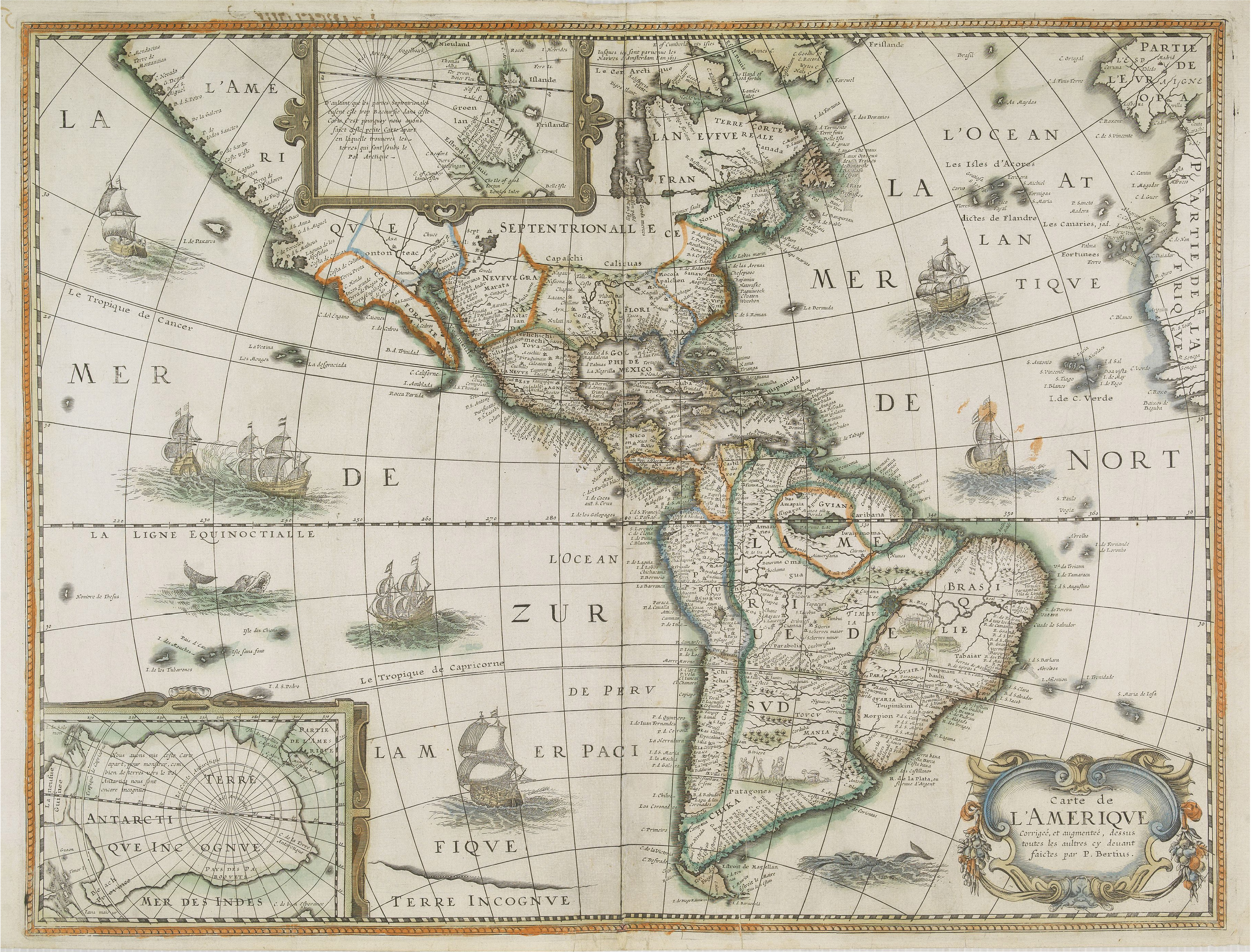
Carte de l'Amerique
