= Stefansson Strait =

Body of water in Palmer Land, Antarctica

- Location within Antarctica
- Location: Wilkins Coast, Antarctic Peninsula, Antarctica
- Coordinates: 69°26′S 62°25′W
- Type: Inlet
- Ocean/sea sources: Weddell Sea

Stefansson Strait (69°26′S 62°25′W) is an ice-filled strait 35 nautical miles (65 km; 40 mi) long and 3 to 10 nautical miles (5.6 to 18.5 km; 3.5 to 11.5 mi) wide, between the east coast of Palmer Land and Hearst Island, Antarctica.

== Location ==
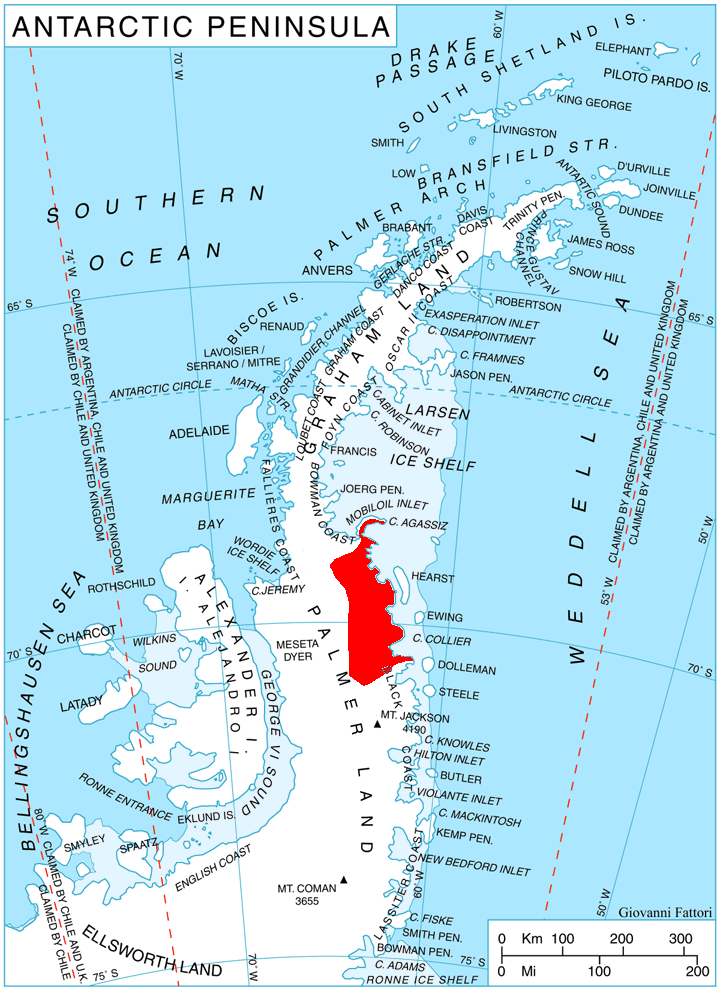
Location of Wilkins Coast on Antarctic Peninsula.

Stefansson Strait is on the Wilkins Coast of Palmer Land, beside the Weddell Sea to the east. It is east of the Eternity Range, north of Hughes Ice Piedmont and south of Scripps Heights and Casey Inlet. The strait separates Hearst Island from the mainland. The south of the strait is at the north side of the mouth of Anthony Glacier, which flows eastward past the Engel Peaks and Mount Martin to enter the sea north of Lewis Point. Features of the coast to the west of the strait, from south to north, include Rhino Rock, Cape Rymill, Briesemeister Peak and Cape Reichelderfer. The Binghy Glacier flows east between De Busk Scarp and Le Feuvre Scarp to enter the trait north of Cape Reichelderfer. The Lurabee Glacier flows northeast along the southeast side of Scripps Heights to enter the sea just north of the strait between Cape Walcott and Cape Hinks on Finley Heights.

== Discovery and name ==
Stefansson Strait was first sighted by Sir Hubert Wilkins at the south end of his flight of December 20, 1928, and was named by him for Vilhjalmur Stefansson. He believed it to be a strait cutting off what is now known to be Antarctic Peninsula from the main land mass of Antarctica. The true orientation of the strait was determined by members of the United States Antarctic Service (USAS) who charted this coast by land and from the air in 1940.

== Features ==
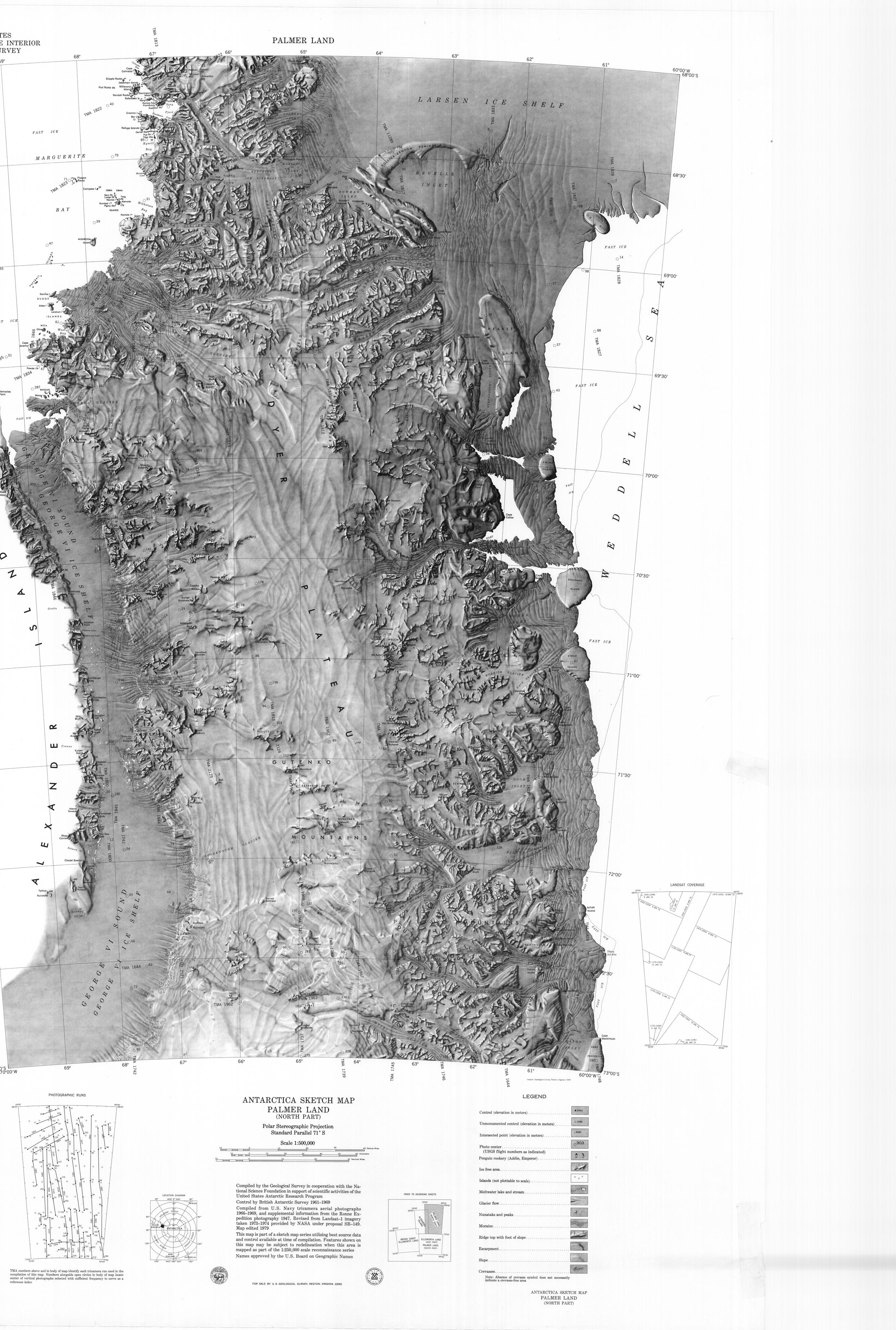
Northern Palmer Land. Stefansson Strait northeast of center of map

=== Hearst Island ===
69°25′S 62°10′W. An ice-covered, dome-shaped island lying 4 nautical miles (7.4 km; 4.6 mi) east of Cape Rymill, off the east coast of Palmer Land. The island is 36 nautical miles (67 km; 41 mi) long, in a north–south direction, 7 nautical miles (13 km; 8.1 mi) wide, and rises to 365 metres (1,198 ft) high. First sighted on a flight on December 20, 1928 by Sir Hubert Wilkins. Thinking it was part of the mainland of Antarctica, he named it Hearst Land for William Randolph Hearst, who helped finance the expedition. It was resighted and its insularity ascertained in 1940 by members of the USAS who explored this coast by land and from the air. They named it Wilkins Island. Examination of aerial photographs have shown, however, that this large island is what Wilkins considered Hearst Land.

=== Anthony Glacier ===
69°47′S 62°45′W. A glacier which flows in an east-southeast direction to the east coast of Palmer Land where it terminates opposite the south tip of Hearst Island. The upper part of this glacier was seen by a sledge party of the British Graham Land Expedition (BGLE) under John Rymill in 1936-37. The glacier was seen from the seaward side in 1940 by a sledging party from East Base of the USAS, and in 1947 was photographed from the air by the Ronne Antarctic Research Expedition (RARE) under Finn Ronne. Named by Ronne for Alexander Anthony of the J.P. Stevens Co., New York, which contributed windproof clothing to the RARE.

=== Engel Peaks ===
69°32′S 63°08′W. Three peaks, the highest 1,460 metres (4,790 ft) high, extending in a northwest–southeast direction for 4 nautical miles (7.4 km; 4.6 mi), standing 15 nautical miles (28 km; 17 mi) west of Cape Rymill on the east side of Palmer Land. This feature was photographed from the air in 1928 by Sir Hubert Wilkins, and again in 1940 by members of the USAS who also sledge surveyed along this coast. The peaks were resighted by the RARE, 1947-48, under Ronne, who named them for Bud Engel, president of the Albert Richard Division of the Osterman Co., Milwaukee, who contributed garments suitable for winter use to the expedition.

=== Mount Martin ===
69°40′S 62°59′W. A mountain, 1,360 metres (4,460 ft) high, with conspicuous rock exposures on its southeast side, standing immediately north of the head of Anthony Glacier on the east coast of Palmer Land. The mountain lies on the fringe of the area explored by the BGLE in 1936, and was photographed from the air by the USAS in 1940. During 1947 the mountain was photographed from the air by members of the RARE, under Ronne, who in conjunction with the Falkland Islands Dependencies Survey (FIDS) charted it from the ground. Named by Ronne for Orville Martin, electronics engineer who was of assistance in planning and obtaining radio equipment necessary for Ronne's expedition.

=== Rhino Rock ===
69°34′S 62°32′W. A prominent black rock with steep sides rising to 700 metres (2,300 ft) high, standing 5 nautical miles (9.3 km; 5.8 mi) southwest of Cape Rymill. It was named Rhino Horn Rock for its suggestive appearance by members of the East Base of the USAS who charted the area on land and from the air in 1940, but the name has been shortened to Rhino Rock.

=== Cape Rymill ===
69°30′S 62°25′W. A steep, metamorphic rock cliff standing opposite the central part of Hearst Island and jutting out from the icecap along the east coast of Palmer Land. Named for John Rymill by members of the East Base of the USAS who charted this coast by land and from the air in 1940. Rymill was the leader of the BGLE, and in 1936 sledged eastward across Antarctic Peninsula to 69°45'S, 63°28'W.

=== Briesemeister Peak ===
69°28′S 62°45′W. A peak, 690 metres (2,260 ft) high, which stands 7 nautical miles (13 km; 8.1 mi) west-northwest of Cape Rymill. This peak was photographed from the air by Sir Hubert Wilkins on December 20, 1928, and by the USAS in 1940. It was named by the RARE under Finn Ronne, 1947–48, after William A. Briesemeister (d. 1967), Chief Cartographer, American Geographical Society, 1913-63, who by recognizing this peak on two photographs taken by Wilkins established their continuity, an important clue to the identity and correct position of Stefansson Strait (Geographical Review, July 1948, pp. 477, 484); he supervised the preparation of maps of Antarctica for use during the International Geophysical Year (IGY; 1957-58) and post-IGY programs of United States Antarctic Research Program (USARP), including continental maps published at a scale of 1:6 million (1956) and 1:5 million (1962).

=== Cape Reichelderfer ===
69°22′S 62°43′W. A rounded, mainly ice-covered headland 4 nautical miles (7.4 km; 4.6 mi) east of DeBusk Scarp, lying at the west side of Stefansson Strait. This cape was seen by Sir Hubert Wilkins who explored this coast on his aerial flight of December 20, 1928. It was charted in 1940 by the USAS and erroneously called Cape Rymill at that time. Resighted in 1947 by the RARE under Ronne who named it for Francis W. Reichelderfer, Chief of the United States Weather Bureau.

=== Lurabee Glacier ===
69°15′S 63°37′W. A glacier 27 nautical miles (50 km; 31 mi) long, flowing northeast between Scripps Heights and Finley Heights to the east coast of Palmer Land. This glacier was discovered by Sir Hubert Wilkins on December 20, 1928 on his pioneer Antarctic flight. He named it Lurabee Channel for Lurabee Shreck of San Francisco, in recognition of her aid in procuring equipment for this and an earlier Arctic flight, and for her editorial assistance on his book Flying the Arctic. The term "channel" has been amended to "glacier", in keeping with the true nature of the feature.

=== Cape Hinks ===
69°10′S 63°10′W. A bold headland surmounted by a high ice-covered dome, marking the north extremity of Finley Heights on the east coast of Palmer Land. Discovered and photographed by Sir Hubert Wilkins on his flight of December 20, 1928. Later photographed from the air by Lincoln Ellsworth in 1935, and by the USAS in 1940. Named by the US-SCAN for Arthur R. Hinks, Secretary of the Royal Geographical Society, 1915-45, who undertook in his published studies to reconcile the explorations of Wilkins, Ellsworth, Rymill and the USAS in this general area.

=== Finley Heights ===
69°13′S 63°13′W. Rugged coastal heights rising to 1,070 metres (3,510 ft) high between the mouths of Bingham and Lurabee Glaciers, on the east coast of Palmer Land. Discovered by Sir Hubert Wilkins in an aerial flight on December 20, 1928. He considered the heights to be islands lying in a great transverse channel across Antarctic Peninsula and named them Finley Islands for John Huston Finley of The New York Times, then president of the American Geographical Society. Correlation of aerial photographs taken by Lincoln Ellsworth in 1935 and preliminary reports of the findings of the British Graham Land Expedition (BGLE), 1934-37, led W.L.G. Joerg to interpret this to be joined to the mainland. In published reports, members of the BGLE have concurred in this interpretation which was also borne out by the results of subsequent flights and a sledge trip from East Base, in 1940, by members of the USAS.

== Sources ==
- Alberts, Fred G., ed. (1995), Geographic Names of the Antarctic (PDF) (2 ed.), United States Board on Geographic Names This article incorporates public domain material from websites or documents of the United States Board on Geographic Names.
- Palmer Land, USGS: United States Geological Survey

This article incorporates public domain material from websites or documents of the United States Geological Survey.
