= Hollick-Kenyon Peninsula =

Peninsula in Antarctica

- Location within Antarctica

Geography
- Location: Weddell Sea
- Coordinates: 68°35′S 63°50′W

Administration
- Antarctica

The Hollick-Kenyon Peninsula (68°35′S 63°50′W) is an ice-covered spur from the main mountain mass of the Antarctic Peninsula. It projects over 40 nautical miles (74 km; 46 mi) in a northeasterly arc from its base between Mobiloil Inlet and Casey Inlet.

== Location ==
Location of Wilkins Coast on Antarctic Peninsula. The peninsula forms its northern tip

The Hollick-Kenyon Peninsula separates the north end of the Wilkins Coast from the southeast end of the Bowman Coast of Palmer Land on the Antarctic Peninsula, beside the Weddell Sea to the north and east. It is surrounded by the Larsen Ice Shelf. Bowman Inlet is immediately to the west, and Mobiloil Inlet is further west. Casey Inlet is to the south. The arc of the peninsula encloses Revelle Inlet between Cape Agassiz on its northern tip and Cape Keeler on its southeast point. Poseidon Pass separates Cape Keeler from Cape Mayo. Mount Argus connects the peninsula to the mainland.

== Discovery and name ==
The Hollick-Kenyon Peninsula was discovered and partially photographed from the air by Lincoln Ellsworth on his 1935 trans-Antarctic flight from Dundee Island to the Ross Sea. In 1940 it was photographed from the air and charted from the ground by the United States Antarctic Service (USAS). The peninsula is named for Herbert Hollick-Kenyon, the pilot of Lincoln Ellsworth's flight in 1935, whose demonstration of the practicability of landing and taking off an airplane in isolated areas constitutes a distinct contribution to the technique of Antarctic exploration.

== Features ==
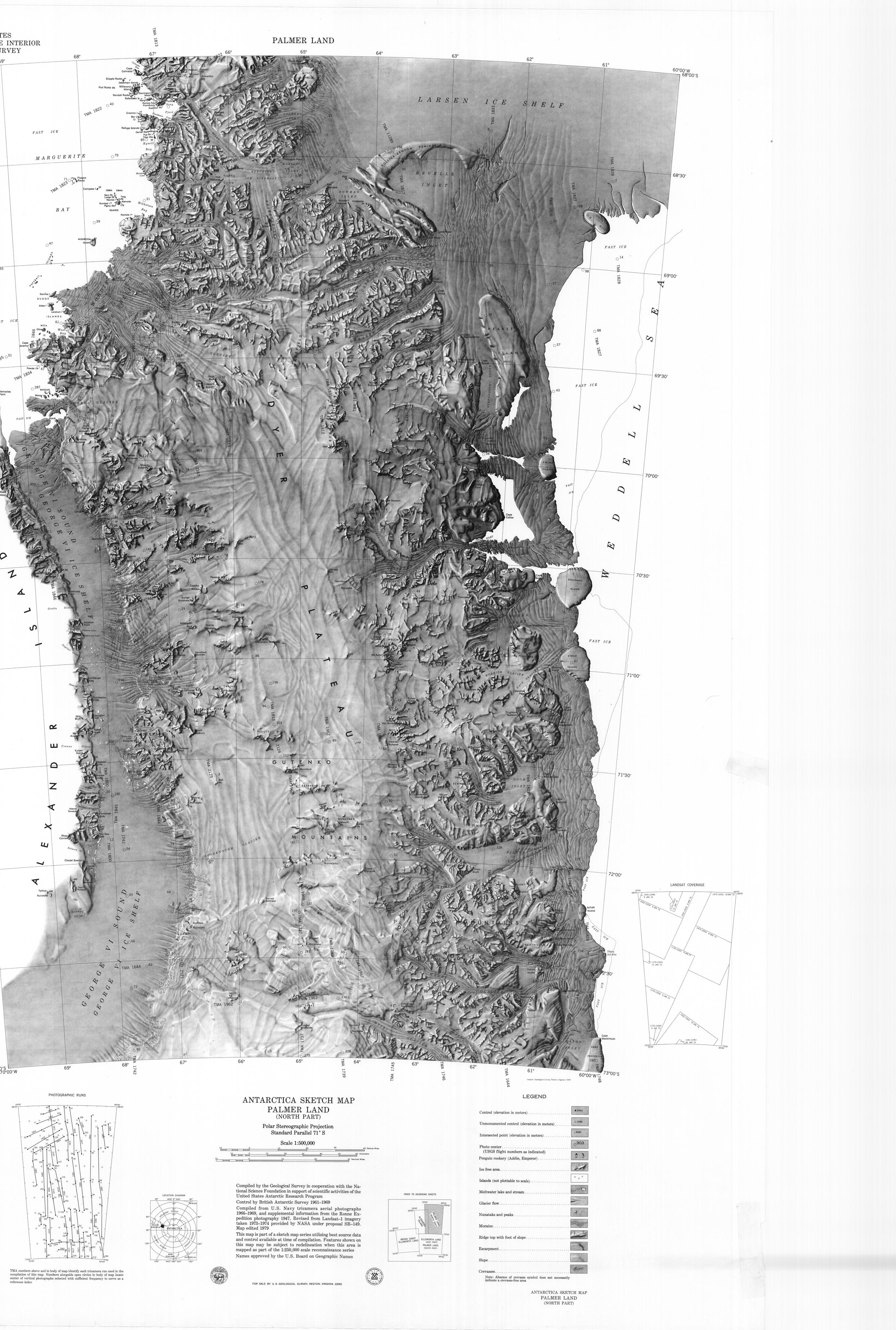
Northern Palmer Land. Hollick-Kenyon Peninsula in northeast of map

=== Revelle Inlet ===
68°40′S 63°26′W. A broad, ice-filled inlet which recedes west some 15 nautical miles (28 km; 17 mi) between Cape Agassiz and Cape Keeler. The inlet lies in the area explored from the air by Sir Hubert Wilkins in 1928 and Lincoln Ellsworth in 1935, but it was first charted by the US AS in 1940. It was resighted by the Ronne Antarctic Research Expedition (RARE), 1947-48, under Finn Ronne, who named it for Roger Revelle, oceanographer at the Scripps Institute for Oceanographic Research, who gave technical assistance during the fitting out of the Ronne expedition.

=== Cape Agassiz ===
68°29′S 62°56′W. The east tip of Hollick-Kenyon Peninsula. The cape is the east end of a line from Cape Jeremy dividing Graham Land and Palmer Land. Discovered in December 1940 by the USAS who named it for W. L. G. Joerg, a geographer and polar specialist. At his request it was named by the United States Special Committee on Antarctic Names (US-SCAN) for Louis Agassiz, an internationally famous American naturalist and geologist of Swiss origin, who first propounded the theory of continental glaciation (Etudes sur les Glaciers, Neuchatel, 1840).

=== Cape Keeler ===
68°51′S 63°13′W. An ice-covered cape, which rises gently northwestward to 520 metres (1,710 ft) high, forming the south side of the entrance to Revelle Inlet. Discovered on 20 December 1928 by Sir Hubert Wilkins, who named it for Fred E. Keeler of the Lockheed Company. An advance base and meteorological station was established at Cape Keeler by the RARE under Ronne in 1947-48.

=== Poseidon Pass ===
68°47′S 63°40′W. A pass about 375 metres (1,230 ft) high on the east side of Antarctic Peninsula. It leads from Bowman Inlet (Note: Alberts (1995) says Poseidon Pass leads from Mobiloil Inlet to the Larsen Ice Shelf. The map shows it leading from Bowman Inlet, to the east of Mobiloil Inlet. Probably the Alberts (1995) definition was not updated after Bowman Inlet was identified as a separate feature from Mobiloil Inlet.) to the Larsen Ice Shelf between Cape Keeler and Cape Mayo. Photographed from the air by RARE, December 1947, and roughly surveyed from the ground by FIDS, November 1947. It was used by the east coast geological party from Stonington Island, November 1960, and was found to provide an ideal sledge route. Named by UK-APC after Poseidon, god of the sea and of earthquakes in Greek mythology.

=== Cape Mayo ===
68°54′S 63°23′W. A bare rock cliff, forming the east end of a flat, ice-covered platform which rises to 500 metres (1,600 ft) high, situated between Cape Keeler and Miller Point. Discovered by Sir Hubert Wilkins on a flight, 20 December 1928, and named by him for William B. Mayo of the Ford Motor Company. It has been more fully defined on the basis of information resulting from flights by Lincoln Ellsworth in 1935, and from the flights and sledge journey along this coast by members of the East Base of the USAS in 1940.

== Sources ==
- Alberts, Fred G., ed. (1995), Geographic Names of the Antarctic (PDF) (2 ed.), United States Board on Geographic Names This article incorporates public domain material from websites or documents of the United States Board on Geographic Names.
- Palmer Land, USGS: United States Geological Survey

This article incorporates public domain material from websites or documents of the United States Geological Survey.
