= DeBusk Scarp =

DeBusk Scarp (69°23′S 62°57′W) is a nearly vertical rock cliff, 2 nautical miles (4 km) long and rising to 300 metres (1,000 ft), at the south side of the mouth of Bingham Glacier, on the east coast of Palmer Land, Antarctica. This feature was photographed from the air in 1928 by Sir Hubert Wilkins, and again in 1940 by members of the United States Antarctic Service who also sledge surveyed along this coast. It was resighted by the Ronne Antarctic Research Expedition (RARE), 1947–48, under Finn Ronne, who named it after Clarence DeBusk, executive secretary of the Chamber of Commerce, Beaumont, Texas, who was of assistance to the RARE in the preparation for the voyage south.
