= Bermel Peninsula =

Peninsula in Graham Land, Antarctica

- Location within Antarctica

Geography
- Location: Weddell Sea
- Coordinates: 68°27′S 65°22′W

Administration
- Antarctica

The Bermel Peninsula (68°27′S 65°22′W) is a rugged, mountainous peninsula, approximately 15 nautical miles (28 km; 17 mi) long and 7 nautical miles (13 km; 8.1 mi)) wide, between Solberg Inlet and Mobiloil Inlet on the Bowman Coast, Graham Land, Antarctica. The feature rises to 1,670 metres (5,480 ft) in Bowditch Crests and includes Yule Peak, Mount Wilson, Campbell Crest, Vesconte Point, Wilson Pass, Rock Pile Peaks, Miyoda Cliff, and Rock Pile Point.

== Location ==
Bowman Coast on Antarctic Peninsula.

Bermel Peninsula is in the south of the Bowman Coast of Graham Land on the Antarctic Peninsula, extended into the Weddell Sea to the east. Solberg Inlet is to the north and Mobiloil Inlet is to the south. Gibbs Glacier and Hadley Upland is to the west. Features include, from east to west, Rock Pile Point, Miyoda Cliff, Rock Pile Peaks, Wilson Pass, Vesconte Point, Mount Wilson, Bowditch Crests and Yule Peak.

== Exploration and name ==
The peninsula lies along the route explored and photographed from the air by Sir Hubert Wilkins, 1928, and Lincoln Ellsworth, 1935. It was first mapped from the Ellsworth photographs by W. L. G. Joerg in 1937. The United States Antarctic Service (USAS) explored this area from the ground, 1939–41, roughly positioning the peninsula. The USAS also photographed the feature from the air in 1940, referring to it as "The Rock Pile" or "Rock Pile Point" from the appearance as a jumbled mass of peaks. The United States Board on Geographic Names (USBGN) approved the name Rock Pile Point for the peninsula in 1947, but the decision was subsequently vacated.

Although Rock Pile Peaks was approved for eastern summits and Rock Pile Point for the east extremity, the peninsula remained unnamed for about four decades. However, reference to a geographic feature of this magnitude is needed, and in 1993 the UK Antarctic Place-Names Committee (UK-APC) recommended the peninsula be named after Peter F. Bermel (see also Bermel Escarpment), cartographer, United States Geological Survey (USGS), 1946-94; Assistant Director for Programs, USGS; Member, United States Advisory Committee on Antarctic Names (US-ACAN), 1979-94 (Chairman, 1993–94).

== Features ==
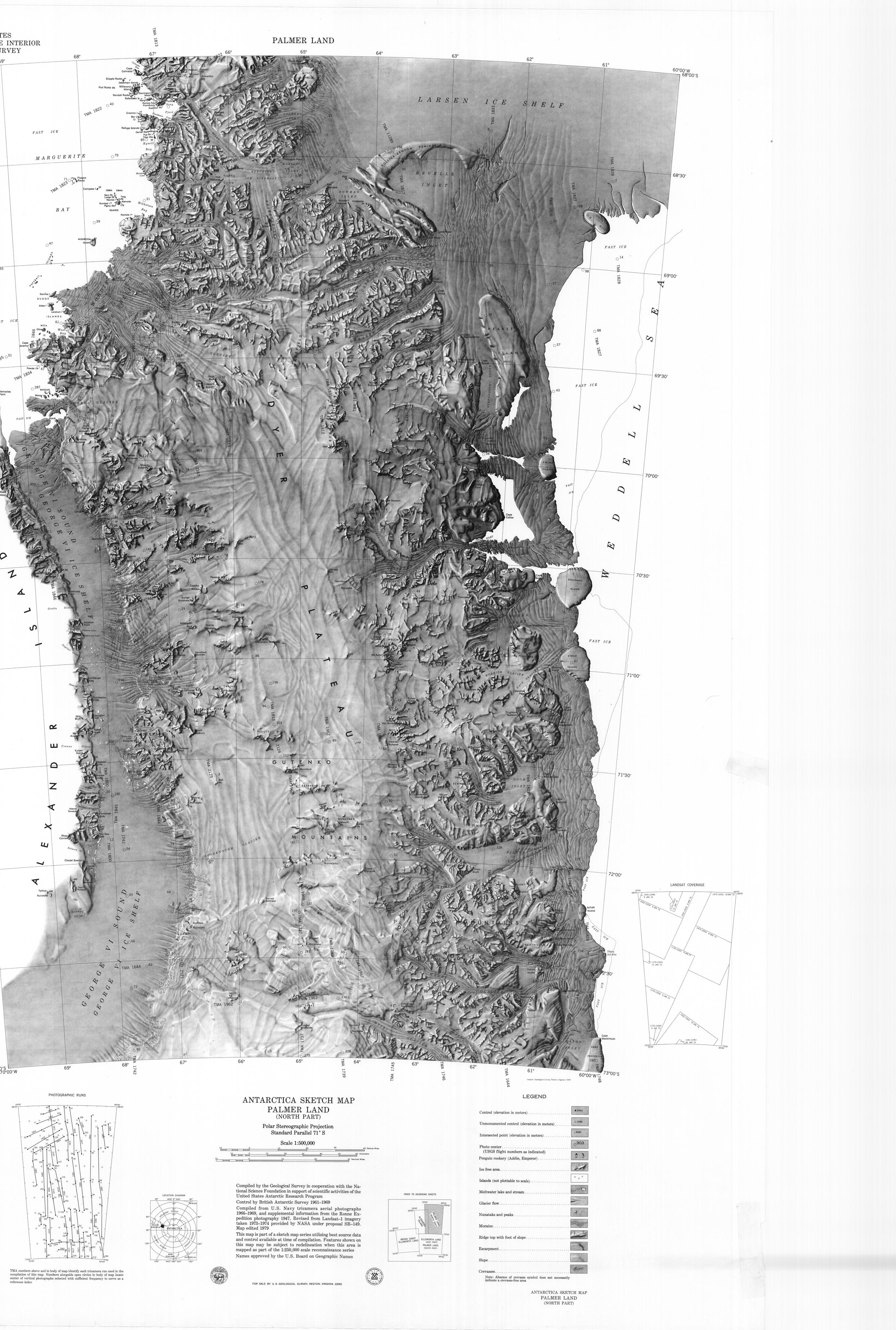
Northern Palmer Land. Bermel Peninsula (not shown) in north of map, north of Mobiloil Inlet

=== Rock Pile Point ===
68°25′S 64°58′W. The east point of Bermel Peninsula. This feature was photographed from the air and roughly positioned by USAS, 1939-41, which applied the descriptive name Rock Pile Point to the peninsula. The name was subsequently reapplied by US-ACAN to the east point.

=== Miyoda Cliff ===
68°22′S 65°05′W. A rock cliff rising to about 400 metres (1,300 ft) high at the northeast end of Rock Pile Peaks, marking the south entrance point to Solberg Inlet. The cliff was photographed from the air by the US AS, 1940, the United States Navy, 1966, and was surveyed by FIDS, 1946-48. Named by US-ACAN in 1977 for Larry W. Miyoda, Station Manager, Palmer Station, 1976; engineer, Siple Station, 1974.

=== Rock Pile Peaks ===
68°25′S 65°09′W. A cluster of peaks rising to 1,110 metres (3,640 ft) high between Wilson Pass and Rock Pile Point. The peaks were photographed from the air by Sir Hubert Wilkins, 1928, and Lincoln Ellsworth, 1935, and were roughly mapped from the photographs by W.L.G. Joerg, 1937; further photographed from the air by USAS, 1940; surveyed by Falkland Islands Dependencies Survey (FIDS), 1947. The name Rock Pile Peaks was suggested by UK-APC in 1952. It derives from Rock Pile Point, a name applied descriptively to Bermel Peninsula by US AS, 1939-41, but subsequently reapplied by US-ACAN to the east point of the peninsula.

=== Wilson Pass ===
68°26′S 65°15′W. A glacier pass at about 400 metres (1,300 ft) high, running northwest–southeast between Bowditch Crests and Rock Pile Peaks. The pass leads from Solberg Inlet to Mobiloil Inlet. The feature was photographed from the air by Lincoln Ellsworth, 1935, the USAS, 1939-41, and RARE, 1947–48. Named after Alison Wilson, of the Center for Polar Archives, National Archives, Washington, DC, who has been associated with Antarctic research from 1957; member, United States Advisory Committee on Antarctic Names, 1974-94; Chair, 1986-93.

=== Vesconte Point ===
68°31′S 65°12′W. A steep rock point on the south side of Bermel Peninsula, marking the extremity of a spur running southeast from the easternmost of the Bowditch Crests. The point was first roughly mapped by W. L. G. Joerg from air photos taken by Lincoln Ellsworth on 23 November 1935; surveyed by FIDS, December 1958. In association with the names of pioneers of navigation grouped in this area, it was named by UK-APC after Petrus Vesconte of Genoa, the earliest known chartmaker whose charts survive (the first dated 1311).

=== Campbell Crest ===
68°30′S 65°27′W. A peak rising to 1,670 metres (5,480 ft) high at the west end of Bowditch Crests, Bermel Peninsula. The feature is the highest point in Bowditch Crests and appears in aerial photographs taken by Sir Hubert Wilkins, 1928, and Lincoln Ellsworth, 1935; roughly mapped from the Ellsworth photographs by W. L. G. Joerg in 1937. Later photographed from the air by USAS, 1940, and United States Navy, 1966; surveyed by FIDS, 1958. Named by UK-APC in 1993 after Jon C. Campbell, geographer, United States Geological Survey from 1981; USGS member in the International GPS Campaign, 1991-92, at McMurdo, Byrd, and South Pole Stations who conducted developmental GPS geodetic surveys from USCGC Polar Sea at Mount Siple and Pine Island Bay; from 1993, Secretary, Advisory Committee on Antarctic Names, United States Board on Geographic Names.

=== Mount Wilson ===
68°27′S 65°33′W. A mountain rising to about 1,300 metres (4,300 ft) high in the west part of Bermel Peninsula. This mountain appears indistinctly in a photograph taken by Sir Hubert Wilkins on his flight of 20 December 1928. The feature was rephotographed in 1935 by Lincoln Ellwsorth, in 1940 by USAS, and in 1947 by Ronne Antarctic Research Expedition (RARE) under Finn Ronne. It was surveyed by the FIDS in 1948. Named by Ronne after Major Gen. R.C. Wilson, chief of staff to Lieutenant Gen. Curtis LeMay, head of the Office of Research and Development of the then Army Air Force, which furnished equipment for RARE.

=== Bowditch Crests ===
68°30′S 65°22′W. A line of precipitous cliffs surmounted by four summits on Bermel Peninsula. The feature was photographed from the air by Lincoln Ellsworth in November 1935 and was mapped from these photos by W.L.G. Joerg. Surveyed by FIDS in 1958. Named by UK-APC for Nathaniel Bowditch (1773-1838), American astronomer and mathematician, author of The New American Practical Navigator (1801) which firmly set out the practical results of theories established at that date and has since gonethrough more than 56 editions.

=== Yule Peak ===
68°31′S 65°37′W. A small but conspicuous triangular rock peak 750 metres (2,460 ft) high at the west end of the Bermel Peninsula. The peak was photographed from the air by Lincoln Ellsworth on 21 and 23 November 1935, and was mapped from these photos by W. L. G. Joerg. Surveyed by FIDS in December 1958 and so named because Christmas Day 1958 was celebrated by the FIDS sledging party close to this peak.

== Sources ==
- Alberts, Fred G., ed. (1995), Geographic Names of the Antarctic (PDF) (2 ed.), United States Board on Geographic Names This article incorporates public domain material from websites or documents of the United States Board on Geographic Names.
- Palmer Land, USGS: United States Geological Survey

This article incorporates public domain material from websites or documents of the United States Geological Survey.
