= Hariot Glacier =

Glacier in Antarctica

Hariot Glacier (69°0′S 66°20′W) is a glacier flowing northwest along the south side of Morgan Upland before turning west into the northern portion of the Wordie Ice Shelf, along the west coast of the Antarctic Peninsula. It was roughly surveyed by the British Graham Land Expedition, 1936–37, and the upper reaches were photographed from the air by the Ronne Antarctic Research Expedition, 1947. The glacier was surveyed from the ground by members of the Falkland Islands Dependencies Survey who traveled along it in December 1958, and it was named by the UK Antarctic Place-Names Committee after Thomas Hariot, an English mathematician who pioneered new methods of navigation under the patronage of Sir Walter Raleigh.
