= Edward W. Bingham =

British Royal Navy officer and polar explorer

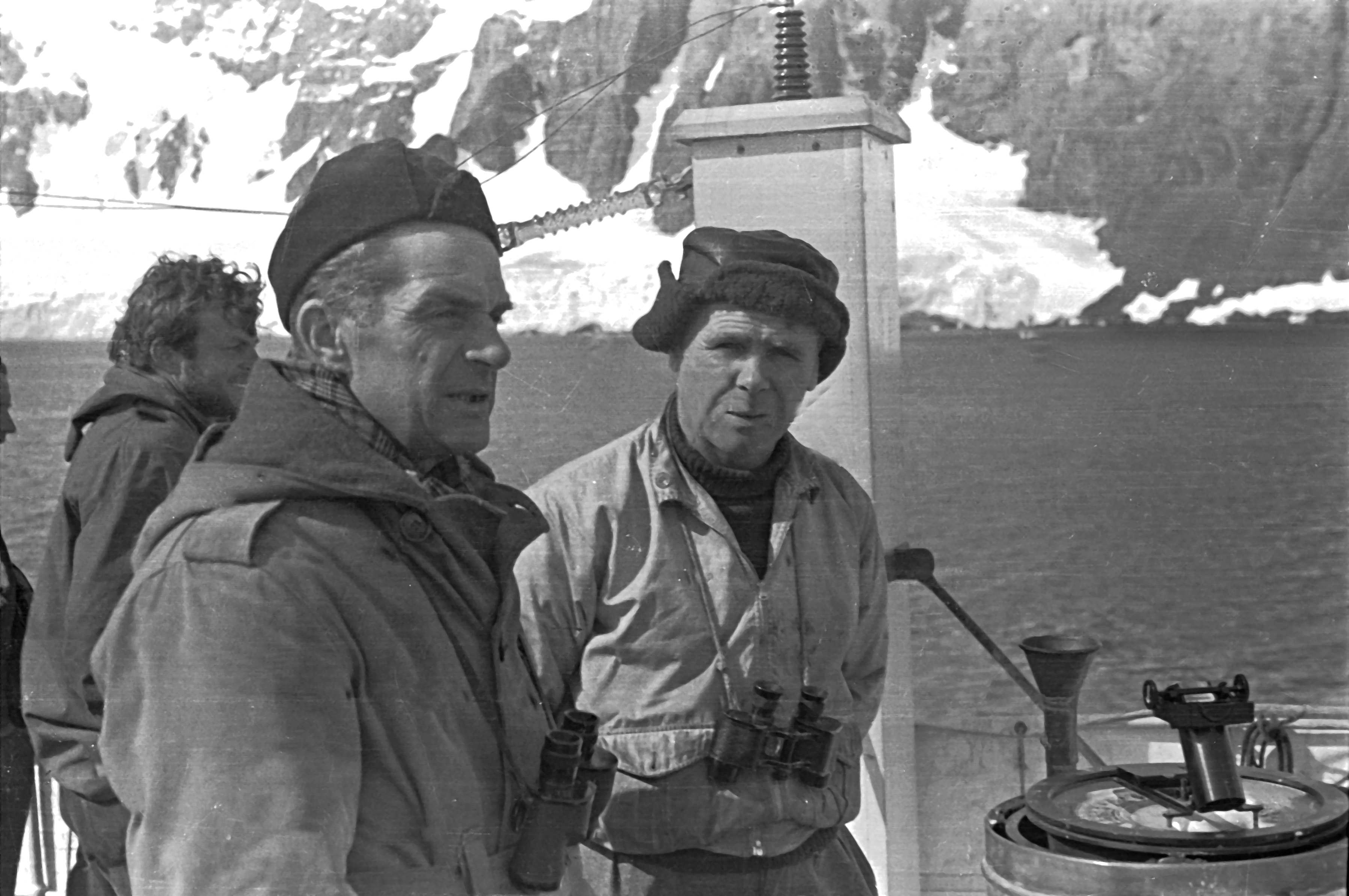
- Edward Bingham (on the right), FIDS commander, in the Antarctic Dec 1945
- Born: 2 January 1901; Dungannon, County Tyrone, Ireland
- Died: 1 September 1993 (aged 92); Halstock, Dorset, England, United Kingdom
- Military career
- Allegiance: United Kingdom
- Branch: Royal Navy
- Service years: 1928–1957
- Rank: Surgeon Captain
- Conflicts: World War II
- Awards: Polar Medal; Order of the British Empire

Surgeon Captain Edward W. Bingham OBE (2 January 1901 – 1 September 1993) was a British Royal Navy officer and polar explorer who had the rare third clasp added to his Polar Medal.

== Biography ==
Edward (Ted) William Bingham was born on 2 January 1901 in Dungannon, County Tyrone, the son of the headmaster of Dungannon Royal School. In 1926 he graduated in medicine from Trinity College, Dublin. Joining the Royal Navy in 1928, in 1930 he volunteered to become a member of the British Arctic Air Route Expedition (BAARE) led by Gino Watkins, exploring the east coast and interior of Greenland. He took part as the expedition doctor and to be in charge of the expedition's sled dogs. He was in the party that established a meteorological station on the ice cap. With surveyor Alfred Stephenson and geologist Lawrence Wager he took part in a three-month journey to map the ice cap border of the Schweizerland mountains and to attempt the ascent of Mont Forel, the highest point of the range.

Back from Greenland, he was appointed to carry out an hydrographic survey of the coastal area of the Labrador Peninsula on HMS Challenger for two years. He wintered at Nain and, whilst working by dog sled, increased his experience of huskies and dog team driving.

Bingham went to Antarctica with the 1934-1937 British Graham Land Expedition, led by his former BAARE teammate John Rymill, as medical officer and in charge of the dog sled teams. He took part in a major 535 mile trip across Graham Land from a base on the Debenham Islands to within sight of the Weddell Sea that proved that Graham Land was part of a peninsula not an island as previously thought.

During World War II Bingham was a Surgeon Commander at the Royal Naval Hospital in Plymouth until July 1941. He then served on HMS Duke of York, as Principal Medical Officer, contributing with his Arctic and Antarctic knowledge to the manufacture of improved protective cold-weather clothing for Royal Navy ship watchkeepers and lookouts.

Following various shore appointments, in 1945 Bingham was seconded to the Colonial Office to lead the newly formed Falkland Islands Dependencies Survey (FIDS). He was responsible for recruitment, procurement of supplies and equipment, including sledge dogs, and once in the field for the establishment of three new bases, at Stonington Island, Marguerite Bay; Signy Island, South Orkney Islands, and Argentine Islands, Palmer Archipelago. He wintered at Stonington Island in 1946, returned to the UK in 1947 and administered the London Office of FIDS for a year before re-entering regular naval service.

Bingham was Principal Medical Officer at the Royal Naval Air Station Eglinton, 1948–52, and was promoted to Surgeon Captain in 1951. This was followed by service as Fleet Medical Officer in HMS Vanguard, and finally as Principal Medical Officer at the Royal Naval Air Station Lee-on-Solent. He retired from active Royal Navy service in 1957.

He died on 1 September 1993, aged 92.

== Honours ==
Bingham Glacier in Palmer Land, Antarctica, is named in his honour.

- Polar Medal 1932 (Arctic 1930–31), 2nd clasp 1939 (Antarctic 1935–37), 3rd clasp 1953 (Antarctic 1946).
- OBE 1947.
- Murchison Grant awarded by the Royal Geographical Society 1950.
