= Bingham Glacier =

Glacier in Antarctica

- Location within Antarctic Peninsula Location within Antarctica
- Location: Palmer Land
- Coordinates: 69°23′S 63°10′W
- Thickness: unknown
- Terminus: Larsen Ice Shelf
- Status: unknown

Bingham Glacier is a glacier 15 nautical miles (28 km) long flowing eastward to the east coast of the Antarctic Peninsula, with Cape Reichelderfer as its southern portal. The coast where Bingham Glacier reaches the Larsen Ice Shelf was photographed by Sir Hubert Wilkins in 1928 and by Lincoln Ellsworth in 1935, and was mapped by the British Graham Land Expedition (BGLE) under John Rymill, who with E.W. Bingham sledged across the peninsula to a point close south of this glacier in 1936. It was also mapped in 1940 by the United States Antarctic Service. The glacier was named by the Advisory Committee on Antarctic Names in 1947 for Surgeon Lieutenant Commander E.W. Bingham, Royal Navy, of the BGLE.

== See also ==
- List of glaciers in the Antarctic
