= Bowman Inlet =

Body of water in Graham Land, Antarctica

- Location within Antarctica
- Location: Bowman Coast, Antarctic Peninsula, Antarctica
- Coordinates: 68°42′S 64°23′W
- Type: Inlet
- Ocean/sea sources: Weddell Sea

Bowman Inlet (68°42′S 64°23′W) is an ice-filled inlet between Kay Nunatak and Platt Point on the Hollick-Kenyon Peninsula, on the east coast of the Antarctic Peninsula.

== Location ==
Location of Bowman Coast on Antarctic Peninsula. Bowman Inlet in the east

Bowman Inlet is at the southeast end of the Bowman Coast of Graham Land on the Antarctic Peninsula, opening onto the Weddell Sea to the north. It is ice-filled, and is surrounded by the Larsen Ice Shelf. The Hollick-Kenyon Peninsula and Revelle Inlet are to the east. Casey Glacier and Casey Inlet in Palmer Land are to the south. Mobiloil Inlet is to the west.

The mouth of the inlet is between Platt Point to the east and Kay Nunatak to the west. Glaciers entering the inlet are, clockwise from the southeast, Cronus Glacier, which enters the inlet between Crabeater Point and Calypso Cliffs, Pan Glacier, Aphrodite Glacier, Apollo Glacier, which enters the inlet between Victory Nunatak and Hitchcock Heights. Maitland Glacier joins Earnshaw Glacier to the west of Hitchcock Heights and enters the sea between Yates Spur and Mobiloil Inlet to the west, and Kay Nunatak and Bowman Inlet to the east.

== Discovery and name ==
Bowman Inlet was photographed from the air by Lincoln Ellsworth, 23 November 1935, and its western shore was mapped from the photographs by W.L.G. Joerg. It was rephotographed by the United States Antarctic Service (USAS), 1940, the Ronne Antarctic Research Expedition (RARE), 1947, and was surveyed by the Falkland Islands Dependencies Survey (FIDS), 1958. It was named by the United States Advisory Committee on Antarctic Names (US-ACAN) after Lieutenant Bradley J. Bowman, United States Navy Reserve, officer in charge, Palmer Station Construction Unit, Operation Deep Freeze, 1969.

== Glaciers ==
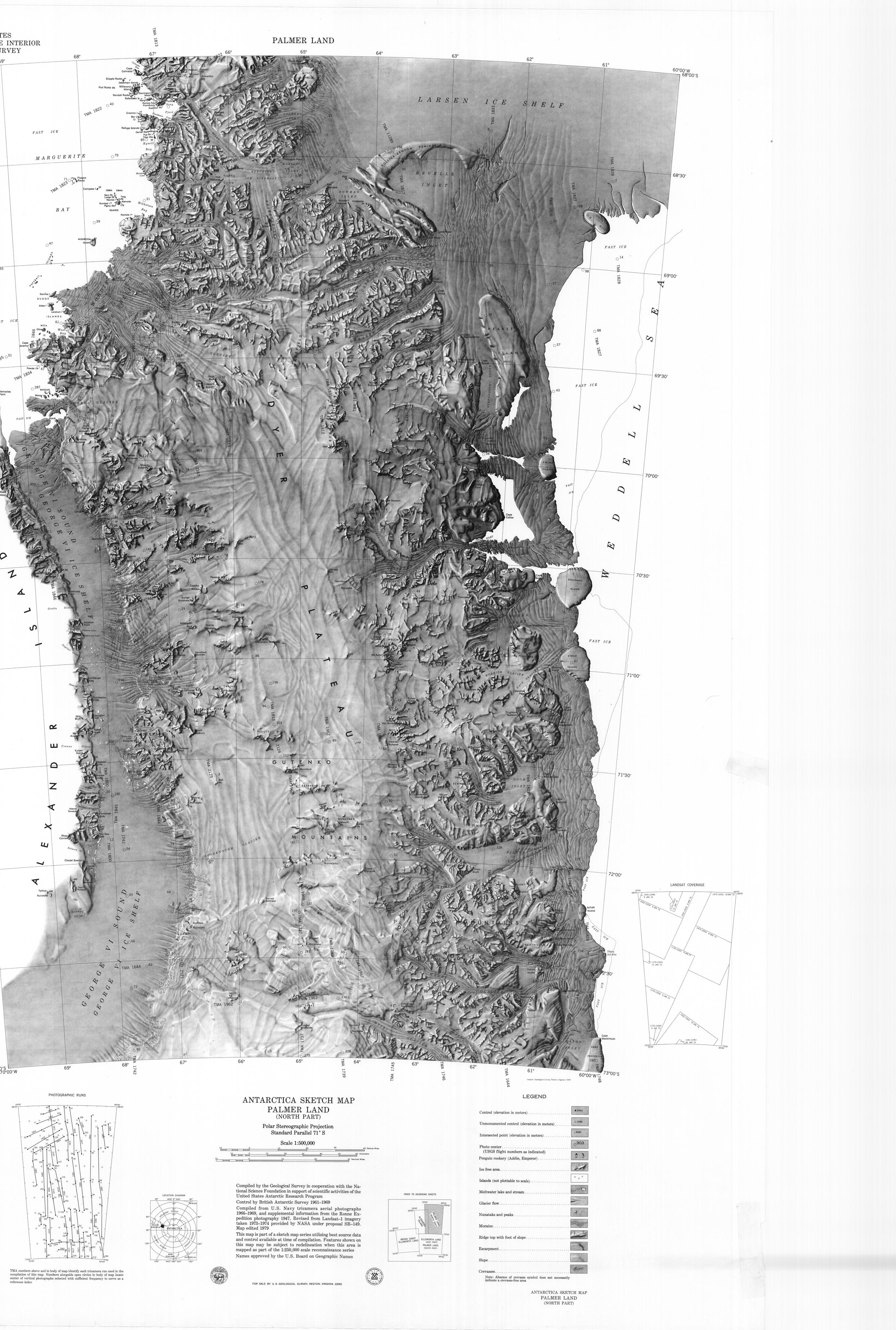
Northern Palmer Land. Bowman Inlet in northeast of map

=== Cronus Glacier ===
68°51′S 64°04′W. A glacier 6 nautical miles (11 km; 6.9 mi) long and 3 nautical miles (5.6 km; 3.5 mi) wide flowing northwest into Bowman Inlet between Calypso Cliffs and Crabeater Point. Photographed by RARE (Trimetrogon air photography) on 22 December 1947, and roughly surveyed by FIDS in December 1958. Named by UK-APC after Cronus, the god of agriculture in Greek mythology.

=== Pan Glacier ===
68°48′S 64°24′W. A glacier 7 nautical miles (13 km; 8.1 mi) long, flowing north and terminating at the east coast of Antarctic Peninsula 2 nautical miles (3.7 km; 2.3 mi) southwest of Victory Nunatak. The lower part of the glacier was plotted by W. L. G. Joerg from air photos taken by Lincoln Ellsworth in November 1935. The glacier was subsequently photographed by RARE (Trimetrogon air photography) in December 1947, and roughly surveyed by FIDS in December 1958. Named by the UK Antarctic Place-Names Committee (UK-APC) after Pan, god of the shepherds in Greek mythology.

=== Aphrodite Glacier ===
68°47′S 64°32′W. A glacier 15 nautical miles (28 km; 17 mi) long flowing north to the east coast of Antarctic Peninsula 3 nautical miles (5.6 km; 3.5 mi) west of Victory Nunatak. The lower portion of the feature was first plotted by W.L.G. Joerg from aerial photographs taken by Sir Hubert Wilkins in December 1928 and Lincoln Ellsworth in November 1935. The glacier was subsequently photographed by RARE in December 1947 (Trimetrogon air photography) and surveyed by FIDS in December 1958 and November 1960. Named by UK-APC after Aphrodite, goddess of love in Greek mythology.

=== Apollo Glacier ===
68°50′S 64°45′W. A glacier, 9 nautical miles (17 km; 10 mi) long, flowing northeast and joining the lower part of Aphrodite Glacier 2 nautical miles (3.7 km; 2.3 mi) from the east coast of Antarctic Peninsula. The lower part of this glacier was first plotted by W.L.G. Joerg from aerial photographs taken by Sir Hubert Wilkins in December 1928 and Lincoln Ellsworth in November 1935. The glacier was subsequently photographed by RARE in December 1947 (Trimetrogon air photography) and roughly surveyed by FIDS in November 1960. Named by UK-APC after Apollo, the god of manly youth and beauty in Greek mythology.

=== Maitland Glacier ===
68°43′S 65°00′W. Glacier flowing along the west flank of Hitchcock Heights into Mobiloil Inlet, on the east coast of Antarctic Peninsula. This glacier may appear indistinctly in an aerial photograph taken by Sir Hubert Wilkins on his flight of 20 December 1928, but it was more clearly shown in aerial photographs taken by Lincoln Ellsworth in 1935 and the USAS in 1940. Named by the US-ACAN in 1952 for O. Maitland Miller of the American Geographical Society, who by utilizing Wilkins' and Ellsworth's photographs assisted in constructing the first reconnaissance map of this area.

=== Earnshaw Glacier ===
68°45′S 65°11′W. A glacier 10 nautical miles (19 km; 12 mi) long, flowing northward to the east of Norwood Scarp and entering Maitland Glacier to the south of Werner Peak. Photographed from the air by the USAS on 28 September 1940. Surveyed by the FIDS in January 1961. Named by UK-APC after Thomas Earnshaw (1749-1829), English watchmaker who made innovations leading to the modern marine chronometer.

== Other features ==
=== Platt Point ===
68°36′S 64°14′W. The east entrance point to Bowman Inlet on the east coast of Antarctic Peninsula. The feature marks the extremity of an ice-covered, though clearly outlined, spur that juts north from the west part of Hollick-Kenyon Peninsula. The margins of the feature were photographed from the air by Lincoln Ellsworth, 1935, but it was more clearly defined by aerial photographs taken by the USAS, 1940. Named by US-ACAN in 1977 for William D. Platt, United States Navy, hospital corpsman, Palmer Station, winter party 1968.

=== Crabeater Point ===
68°46′S 64°10′W. A point at the southeast extremity of Bowman Inlet (Note: Alberts (1995) does not always distinguish Bowman Inlet (named after 1969) from Mobiloil Inlet, although the two are clearly distinct in the 1979 version of the USGS map of the region. This shows Crabeater Point in the southeast of Bowman Inlet, but Alberts (1995) says Crabeater Point is in the southeast extremity of Mobiloil Inlet. Alberts (1995) also places Calypso Cliffs and other features in Mobiloil Inlet. Probably the definitions were not updated when Bowman Inlet was identified and named as a separate feature.) 4 nautical miles (7.4 km; 4.6 mi) east of Victory Nunatak. The point, the northwest extremity of a prominent ridge, was photographed from aircraft of the USAS on 28 September 1940, and by RARE (Trimetrogon air photos), 22 December 1947. Surveyed in December 1958 by FIDS who gave the descriptive name. The ridge of which this point is the extremity resembles a recumbent Crabeater Seal when seen from the air.

=== Calypso Cliffs ===
68°48′S 64°13′W. Two prominent rocky cliffs rising to 850 metres (2,790 ft) high on the south side of Bowman Inlet immediately west of the mouth of Cronus Glacier, on the east coast of Antarctic Peninsula. Photographed from the air by USAS, 28 September 1940, and by RARE (Trimetrogon air photography), 22 December 1947. Surveyed by FIDS in December 1958. Named by UK-APC after Calypso, daughter of Atlas, goddess in Greek mythology.

=== Victory Nunatak ===
68°45′S 64°22′W. A conspicuous island-like nunatak with three rocky summits, the southernmost and highest, 360 metres (1,180 ft) high. It rises above the ice of southeastern Bowman Inlet 8 nautical miles (15 km; 9.2 mi) southeast of Kay Nunatak on the east coast of Antarctic Peninsula. The nunatak was first mapped by W. L. G. Joerg from air photos taken by Lincoln Ellsworth on 23 November 1935. It was subsequently photographed from the air by USAS, September 1940; FIDS, August 1947; and RARE (Trimetrogon air photography), December 1947. Named by UK-APC in 1961; when viewed from the air three dots and a dash, Morse code for the letter "V", are apparent on the surface of the feature.

=== Hitchcock Heights ===
68°46′S 64°51′W. A mostly ice-covered mountain mass, 1,800 metres (5,900 ft) high, between Maitland Glacier and Apollo Glacier at the south side of Mobiloil Inlet, on the east coast of Antarctic Peninsula. Discovered and photographed by Sir Hubert Wilkins on his flight of 20 December 1928, and rephotographed by Lincoln Ellsworth in 1935. Named by the US-ACAN in 1952 for Charles B. Hitchcock of the American Geographical Society, who by utilizing these photographs assisted in constructing the first reconnaissance map of this area.

=== Kay Nunatak ===
68°41′S 64°40′W. A dark rocky nunatak rising to 500 metres (1,600 ft) high, situated at the south side of Mobiloil Inlet and forming the northernmost outlier of Hitchcock Heights. The nunatak was photographed from the air by Sir Hubert Wilkins on 20 December 1928, and by Lincoln Ellsworth in 1935. Named in 1952 by the US-ACAN for John D. Kay of the American Geographical Society, who by utilizing these photographs assisted in constructing the first reconnaissance map of this area.

== Sources ==
- Alberts, Fred G., ed. (1995), Geographic Names of the Antarctic (PDF) (2 ed.), United States Board on Geographic Names This article incorporates public domain material from websites or documents of the United States Board on Geographic Names.
- Palmer Land, USGS: United States Geological Survey

This article incorporates public domain material from websites or documents of the United States Geological Survey.
