= Morgan Upland =

Snow plateau on the Antarctic Peninsula

Morgan Upland (69°S 66°W) is a featureless undulating snow plateau in the central Antarctic Peninsula bounded by Cole Glacier and Clarke Glacier on the north and west, by Weyerhaeuser Glacier on the east, by Airy Glacier on the south, and Hariot Glacier on the southwest. The area was photographed from the air in September 1962 by the British Antarctic Survey (BAS) air unit, and the photos were used by BAS surveyor Ivor P. Morgan, for whom the upland is named, who compiled a map over the period 1961 to 1964.
