= Solberg Inlet =

Inlet in Antarctica

Solberg Inlet (68°19′S 65°15′W) is an ice-filled inlet 5 to 10 nautical miles (18 km) wide, which recedes west 14 nautical miles (26 km) between Rock Pile Peaks and Joerg Peninsula, on the east coast of Graham Land. Discovered by members of the United States Antarctic Service (USAS) in 1940, it was resighted in 1947 by the Ronne Antarctic Research Expedition (RARE) under Ronne, who named it for Rear Admiral Thorvald A. Solberg, U.S. Navy, Chief of Naval Research, who was of assistance to the expedition.
