= Wilkins Coast =

Coordinates: 69°40′S 63°0′W

Wilkins Coast location

Wilkins Coast is that portion of the east coast of the Antarctic Peninsula between Cape Agassiz and Cape Boggs.

== Name ==
Wilkins Coast was named by the United States Advisory Committee on Antarctic Names (US-ACAN) for Sir Hubert Wilkins, who in a pioneer Antarctic exploratory flight on December 20, 1928, flew southward from Deception Island and crossed the Antarctic Peninsula to its east side. He continued southward to Stefansson Strait and Hearst Island, which lie midway along Wilkins Coast.

== Sources ==
- Alberts, Fred G., ed. (1995), Geographic Names of the Antarctic (PDF) (2 ed.), United States Board on Geographic Names This article incorporates public domain material from websites or documents of the United States Board on Geographic Names.
