= East Base =

- Antarctic research station
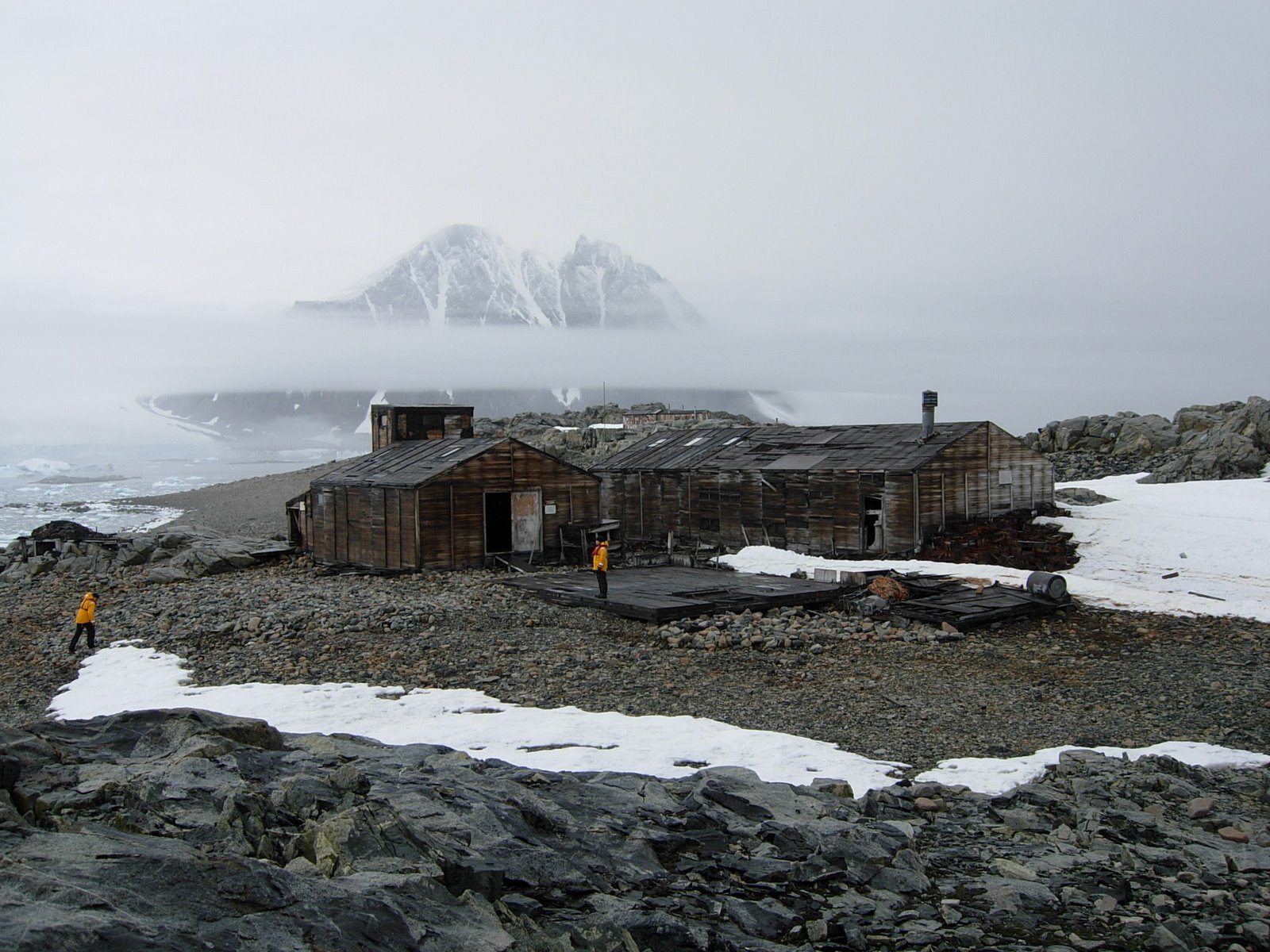
- The abandoned base, February 2007

- Location in Antarctica
- Coordinates: 68°11′02″S 66°59′53″W
- Region: Antarctic Peninsula
- Location: Stonington Island
- Established: 1939
- Evacuated: 1948

Government
  - Type: Administration
  - Body: United States Antarctic Service Expedition
- Active times: All year-round

East Base on Stonington Island is the oldest American research station in Antarctica, having been commissioned by Franklin D. Roosevelt in 1939. The station was built as part of two US wintering expeditions – United States Antarctic Service Expedition (1939–1941) and Ronne Antarctic Research Expedition (1947–1948). The base covers 1,000 metres (3,300 ft) from north to south and 500 metres (1,600 ft) from east to west. The base was accorded the status of one of the Historic Sites and Monuments in Antarctica on 7 May 2004.

== First expedition ==
The Antarctic Service Expedition was the first government-funded expedition of Admiral Richard E. Byrd (his first two expeditions in 1928–1930 and 1933–1935 were privately funded). East Base was built using Army knockdown buildings and a crew of 23 led by Richard Black, after Admiral Byrd had to return to Washington on the USS Bear. The war time pressures and pack-ice in the bay which prevented ship movement led to the evacuation of the base in 1941 by air.

== Second expedition and subsequent decline ==
A private expedition led by Finn Ronne (second in command in the 1941 expedition) in 1947 ended with the participants' evacuation in 1948. The expedition crew included Jackie Ronne and Jennie Darlington, who became the first women to spend a winter in Antarctica. The base and all its equipment have since not been utilized, even though the British Antarctic Survey developed Base E in the vicinity of East Base. The British also occupied and modified the East Base during the construction of Base E. As of 2017, the base is frequented by tourists arriving on the continent.

== See also ==
- List of Antarctic research stations
- List of Antarctic field camps
- Historic Sites and Monuments in Antarctica
