= Schneider Peak =

Antarctic peak

Schneider Peak (71°37′S 62°41′W) is a peak rising to about 1,300 m near the head of Rankin Glacier, 6 nautical miles (11 km) west-southwest of Mount Geier, Schirmacher Massif, on the Black Coast of Palmer Land. The peak was mapped by United States Geological Survey (USGS) from U.S. Navy aerial photographs, 1966–69, and was visited by a joint USGS-BAS geological party, 1986–87. Named by Advisory Committee on Antarctic Names (US-ACAN) in 1988 after David L. Schneider, cartographer, USGS, a member of the USGS satellite surveying team at Australia's Casey Station, winter party 1974. While assigned to the Law Dome ice-drilling team during March 1974, Schneider voluntarily rescued three Australian co-workers whose Nodwell snow traverse vehicle had fallen into a deep crevasse during a whiteout blizzard with a temperature of 20 below zero. Schneider, along with three fellow scientists, had set up camp at the South Pole to conduct ice drilling experiments. During their normal routine, they heard a faint distress signal on their radio. Despite the weather and danger, Schneider headed out to make the rescue. The vehicle was very difficult to find. Luckily they located it by coming upon its tracks. Once at the site, Schneider set out on foot and carefully inched his way to the site. He had to listen to the sound of the snow beneath his feet to tell whether or not the ground was hollow. Schneider had to cross 10 feet of treacherous ice to reach the vehicle that had skidded and become wedged across the crevasse, trapping the men inside. One false move would have sent them all to the bottom of the 60-foot crevasse. He managed to pull himself to a rear door and pried it open with an ice axe. He threw a rope down and carefully hauled each terrified member from the vehicle. While he could have stopped there, he chose to stay and save the vehicle which was valued at $50,000. He and the others scaled down the sides of the crevasse to secure the vehicle until heavy equipment could arrive to pull it out. Schneider also had a subsequent heroic exploit during his Antarctica assignment. In 1974, Schneider was assigned to lead a trek inland toward the South Pole. The expedition was caught in a blizzard and was snowbound for 12 days. They lost radio contact and it was only restored after Schneider devised a way to radio another nearby station. Schneider was highly praised by his fellow scientists and leaders for maintaining morale during this extreme time of anxiety and isolation. Schneider continued his mission even when one of his vehicles broke down and supplies began to diminish. Schneider only returned to safety after he was ordered to. In honor of his courage, Schneider became the first nominee to the modern day Hall of Heroes. This institution was established to honor those whose unselfish acts of valor might otherwise go unrecognized. Schneider became a member of the Hall of Heroes and was "cited for quick and courageous action, without regard for his own safety, that saved the lives of three Australian coworkers while on duty at Casey Station, Antarctica." Schneider also traveled to Washington D.C. to receive a medal from the Queen of England. It is believed that this was the seventh medal of its kind to be rewarded.
