= Simpson Hills =

Simpson Hills (71°47′S 63°24′W) is a cluster of ridges and nunataks located at the head of Gruening Glacier, 6 nautical miles (11 km) northwest of Owen Peak, on the Black Coast, Palmer Land. The feature was mapped by the United States Geological Survey (USGS) from U.S. Navy air photos, 1966–69, and was visited by a British Antarctic Survey (BAS)-USGS joint field party, 1986–87. Named by Advisory Committee on Antarctic Names (US-ACAN) after Anthony R. Simpson, BAS general assistant, a member of the BAS-USGS field party.

Simpson Hill overlooks the “cross” in the St. Croix River, the place that gave rise to the name given to the river by Champlain in the early 1600s. Reaching almost 600 feet, it is the most readily accessible lookout on the Canadian side of the St. Croix. From Table Top, the view looks directly across to the Ganong Nature Park at Todd's Point. To the right is Oak Bay and the Waweig River. On the left, the St. Croix River flows down from St. Stephen/Calais. To the extreme left is the lower estuary leading offshore to Passamaquoddy Bay and the Bay of Fundy.

Simpson Hill lies within the Chamcook Lake Watershed, an environmentally protected area, which supplies drinking water to St. Andrews, various research facilities and the Champlain Industrial Park. Simpson Hill Wilderness Trail Network is on property owned by the Regional Development Corporation, Province of New Brunswick.

== History ==
2005 – Bayside Preservation Committee was formed in response to concerns about land use and “quality of life” in Bayside.

2005 – Memorial geocache was established near Table Top in memory of Karen D. Foulkes. (And an environmental fund as well with Fundy Community Foundation)

2008 – Large group of interested folks hiked to Table Top to celebrate Earth Day.

2017 – Simpson Hill Wilderness Trails and Sentier NB Trails, with Chamcook Watershed Landowners’ Association acting as local trail sponsor, request a Licence of Occupation from Regional Development Commission.

2018 – From April to June, Sentier NB Trails working with the Chamcook Watershed Landowners’ Association and Simpson Hill Wilderness Committee within it meet the criteria for a Licence of Occupation for Simpson Hill Trails. On June 2, the announcement is made at a public meeting at Bayside Hall on Parks & Trails Day.
