= Thomas Glacier (Palmer Land) =

Glacier in Palmer Land, Antarctica

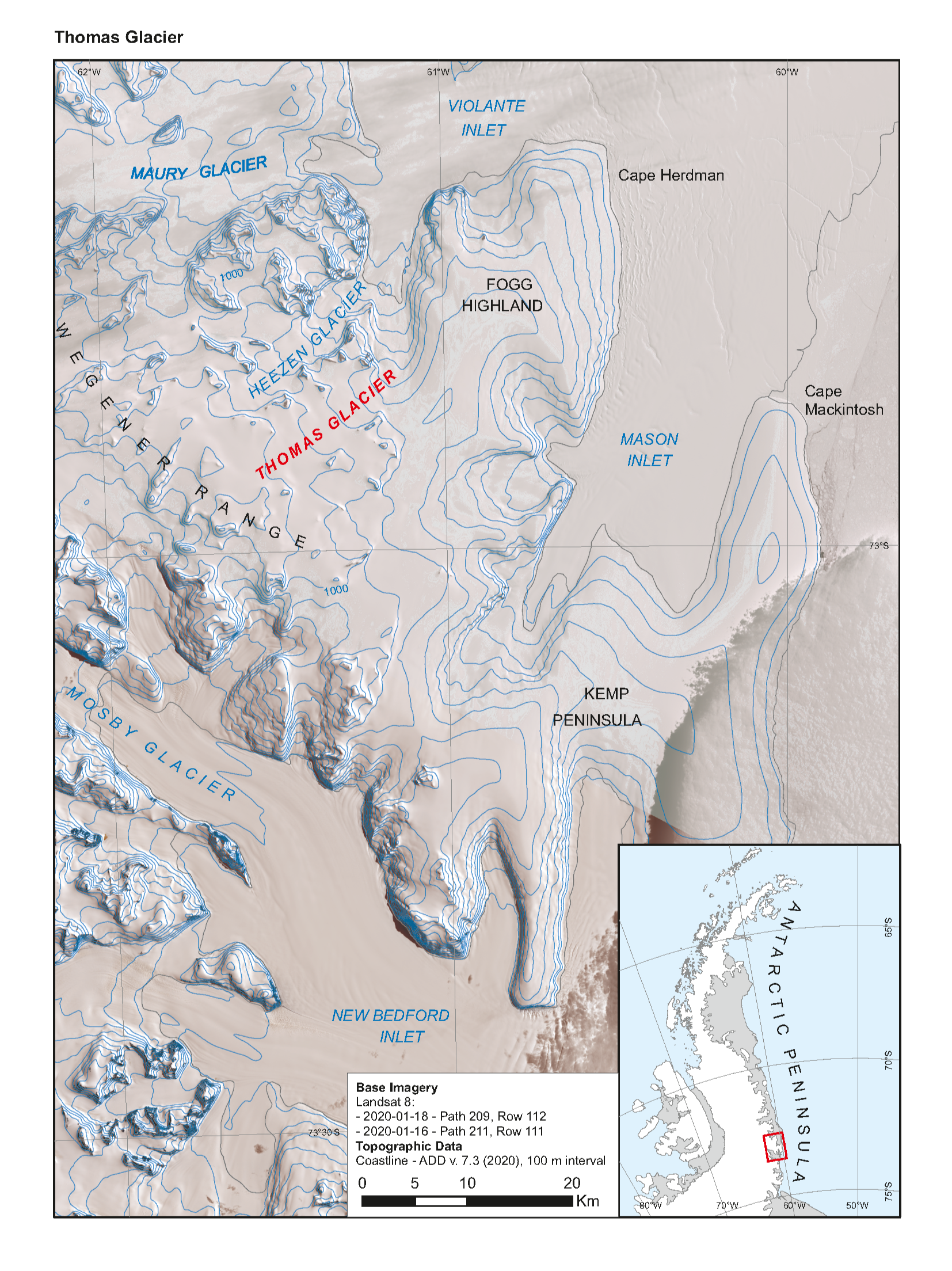
- Topographic map showing the detailed location of Thomas Glacier

- Location within Antarctica
- Location: Palmer Land, Antarctica
- Coordinates: 72°51′S 61°09′W

Thomas Glacier is a glacier in Palmer Land located in the Antarctic Peninsula. The glacier is 23 km long and 3 km wide, flowing north from the Wegener Range and into the Violante Inlet. The glacier lies between Heezen Glacier and Fogg Highland.

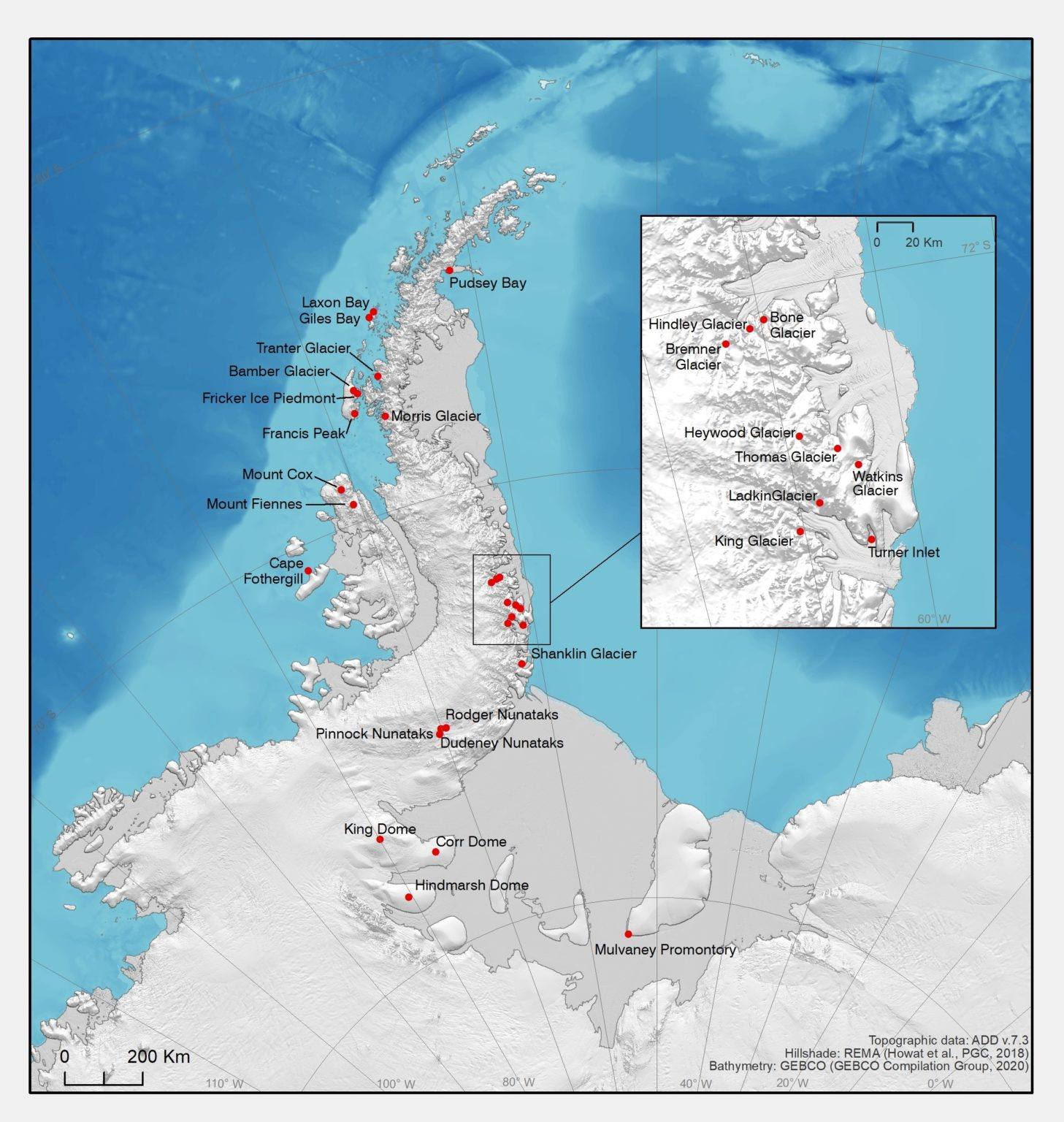
Map of the Antarctic Peninsula displaying regional place names.

Thomas Glacier was named after David N. Thomas, whose research focuses on ice ecology and who has carried out six expeditions to the Southern Ocean and several other in the Arctic. The glacier was named on December 3rd 2020, by the Government of the British Antarctic Territory during the 200th anniversary of the discovery of Antarctica, along with 27 other new place-names to honor leading scientists who have made significant and sustained contributions to Antarctica's research in the last 50 years.

The Thomas Glacier shares an association with the nearby Fogg Highland. Fogg Highland was named in 1981 by the UK APC in honour of Thomas's friend and mentor, Gordon Elliott Fogg. They were both Professors of Marine Biology and Heads of School in the School of Ocean Sciences, Bangor University.
