= Fomalhaut Nunatak =

Nunatak in Palmer Land, Antarctica

Fomalhaut Nunatak (70°58′S 66°40′W) is an isolated, flat-topped nunatak near the head of Ryder Glacier, 6.5 nautical miles (12 km) east of Mount Alpheratz of the Pegasus Mountains, in Palmer Land, Antarctica. It was named by the UK Antarctic Place-Names Committee after the star Fomalhaut in the constellation of Piscis Austrinus.
