= Du Toit Mountains =

Group of mountains in Palmer Land, Antarctica

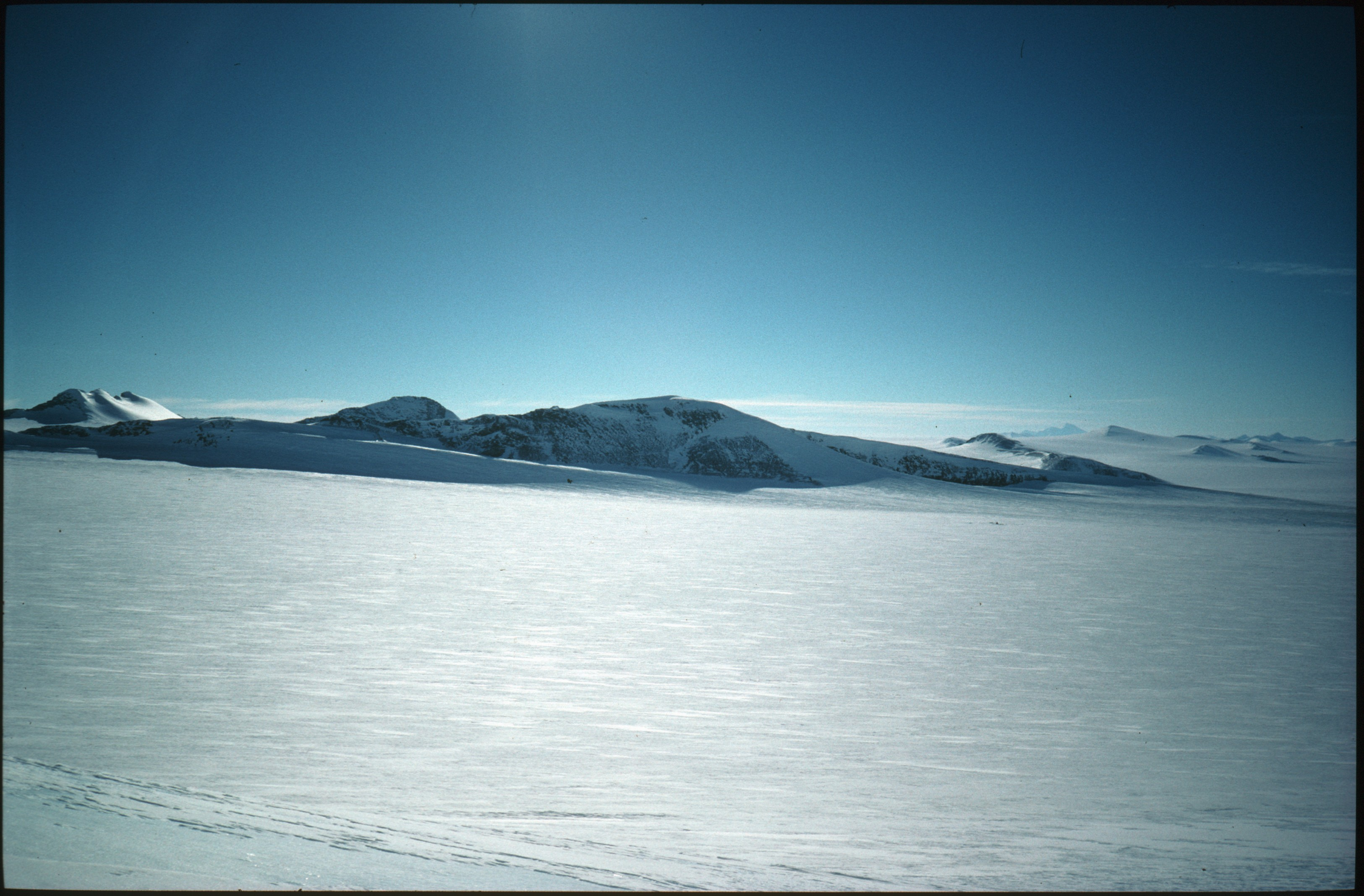
- Du Toit Mountains 24 June 2011 quartz tonalite locality

Geography
- Location within Antarctica
- Continent: Antarctica
- Region: Palmer Land
- Range coordinates: 72°28′S 62°11′W

The Du Toit Mountains (72°28′S 62°11′W) are a group of mountains about 35 nautical miles (65 km; 40 mi) long and 10 nautical miles (19 km; 12 mi) wide, to the south-west of the Wilson Mountains in southeastern Palmer Land, Antarctica. The mountains have peaks rising to 1,700 metres (5,600 ft) and are bounded by Beaumont Glacier, Maury Glacier and Defant Glacier.

== Location ==
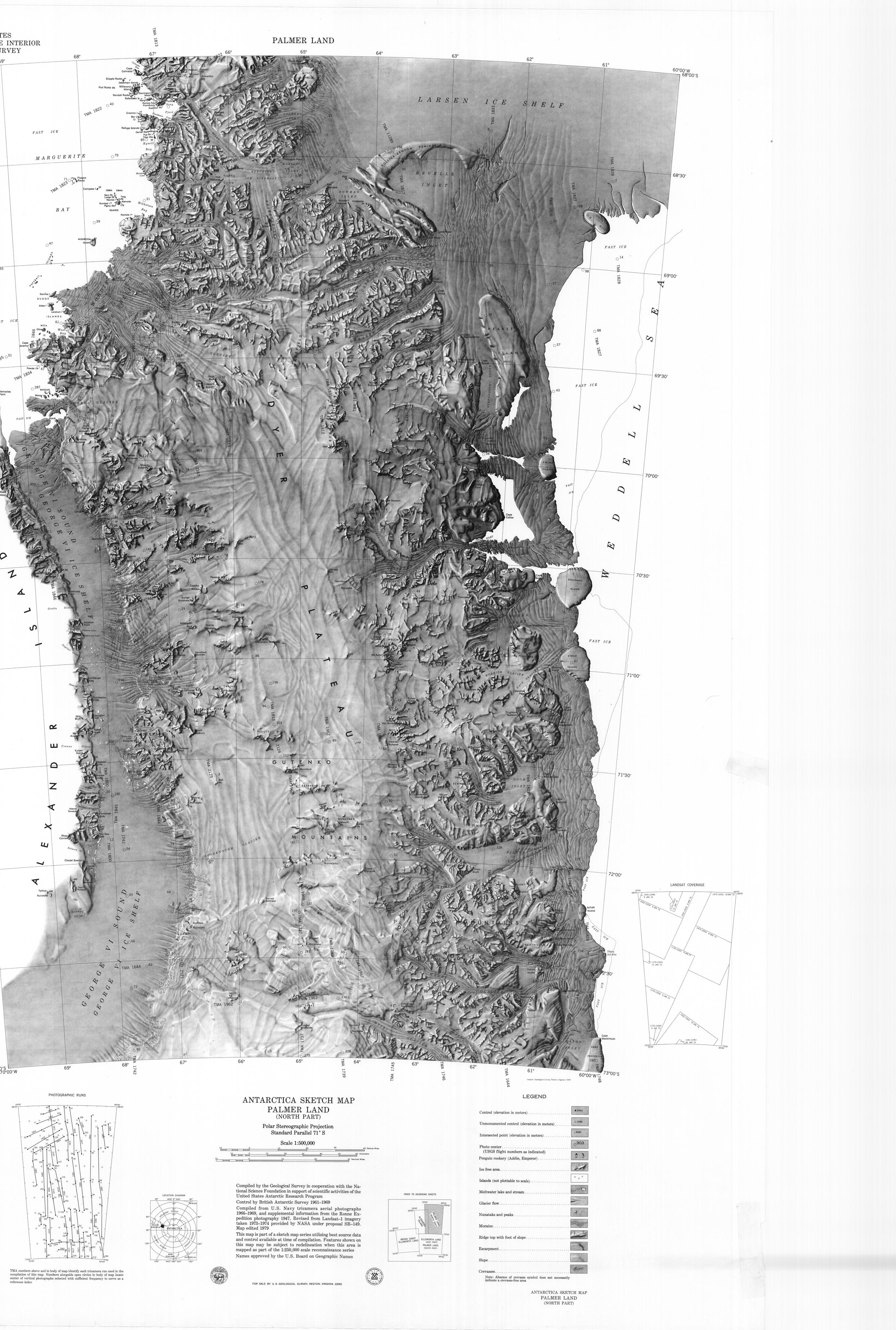
Palmer Land. Wegener Range in southeast of map

The Du Toit Mountained are in eastern Palmer Land, near the Black Coast. The Wegener Range is to the south, and the Holmes Hills and Wilson Mountains are to the north. The Beaumont Glacier flows past their northwestern tip and past the north of the Wilson Mountains to the Hilton Inlet. The Defant Glacier flows to the north of the eastern tip of the Du Toit Mountains, entering Violante Inlet to the east. The Maury Glacier flows between the south of the Du Toit Mountains and the Wegener Range to enter Violante Inlet.

== Discovery and name ==
The Du Toit Mountains were first photographed from the air by the United States Antarctic Service (USAS) in 1940. They were rephotographed by the United States Navy, 1966–69, and mapped from the photographs by the United States Geological Survey (USGS). In association with the names of continental drift scientists grouped in this area, they were named by the United States Advisory Committee on Antarctic Names (US-ACAN) after Alexander Logic Du Toit (1878-1948), a South African geologist who was an early proponent of the theory of continental drift.

== Features ==
=== Mount Wever ===
72°10′S 62°45′W. A mountain which is a northern outlier of the Du Toit Mountains, rising to about 1,700 metres (5,600 ft) high south of Beaumont Glacier and 13 nautical miles (24 km; 15 mi) southwest of Dietz Bluff. Named by US-ACAN in 1988 from a proposal by P.O. Rowley of USGS. Named after Hein E. Wever, British Antarctic Survey (BAS) geologist, member of a joint BAS-USGS field party to the Black Coast, 1986-87.

=== Peck Range ===
72°20′S 62°42′W. A range of mountains, ridges and hills, 11 nautical miles (20 km; 13 mi) long north–south and 6 nautical miles (11 km; 6.9 mi) wide, in the west part of the Du Toit Mountains. The feature rises to about 1,700 metres (5,600 ft) high and is bounded to the south by a high snowfield, and to the east and west by unnamed north-flowing glaciers that coalesce at the north end of the range, south of Mount Wever.

The range was mapped by USGS from United States Navy aerial photographs taken 1966-69 and was visited by a USGS-BAS joint field party, 1986-87. In association with the names of geologists grouped in this area, named by US-ACAN in 1988 after Dallas Lynn Peck, geologist, a world authority on igneous rocks, including granites; eleventh director of the United States Geological Survey, 1981-93; previously, Chief Geologist of the Geologic Division, USGS. Bedrock in the range is almost entirely made up of a coarse-grained fresh granite batholith.

=== Mount Marquis ===
72°29′S 62°30′W. A mountain in the south part of the Du Toit Mountains, situated 4 nautical miles (7.4 km; 4.6 mi) north of Maury Glacier, 28 nautical miles (52 km; 32 mi) south-southwest of Dietz Bluff and 27 nautical miles (50 km; 31 mi) due west of the north end of Pullen Island. It was mapped by USGS from United States Navy aerial photographs, 1966-69. Named by US-ACAN after Peter T. Marquis, general assistant, BAS, a member of the joint BAS-USGS party to this area, 1986-87.

== Sources ==
- Alberts, Fred G., ed. (1995), Geographic Names of the Antarctic (PDF) (2 ed.), United States Board on Geographic Names This article incorporates public domain material from websites or documents of the United States Board on Geographic Names.
- Palmer Land, USGS: United States Geological Survey

This article incorporates public domain material from websites or documents of the United States Geological Survey.
