= Mount Alpheratz =

Mountain in Palmer Land, Antarctica

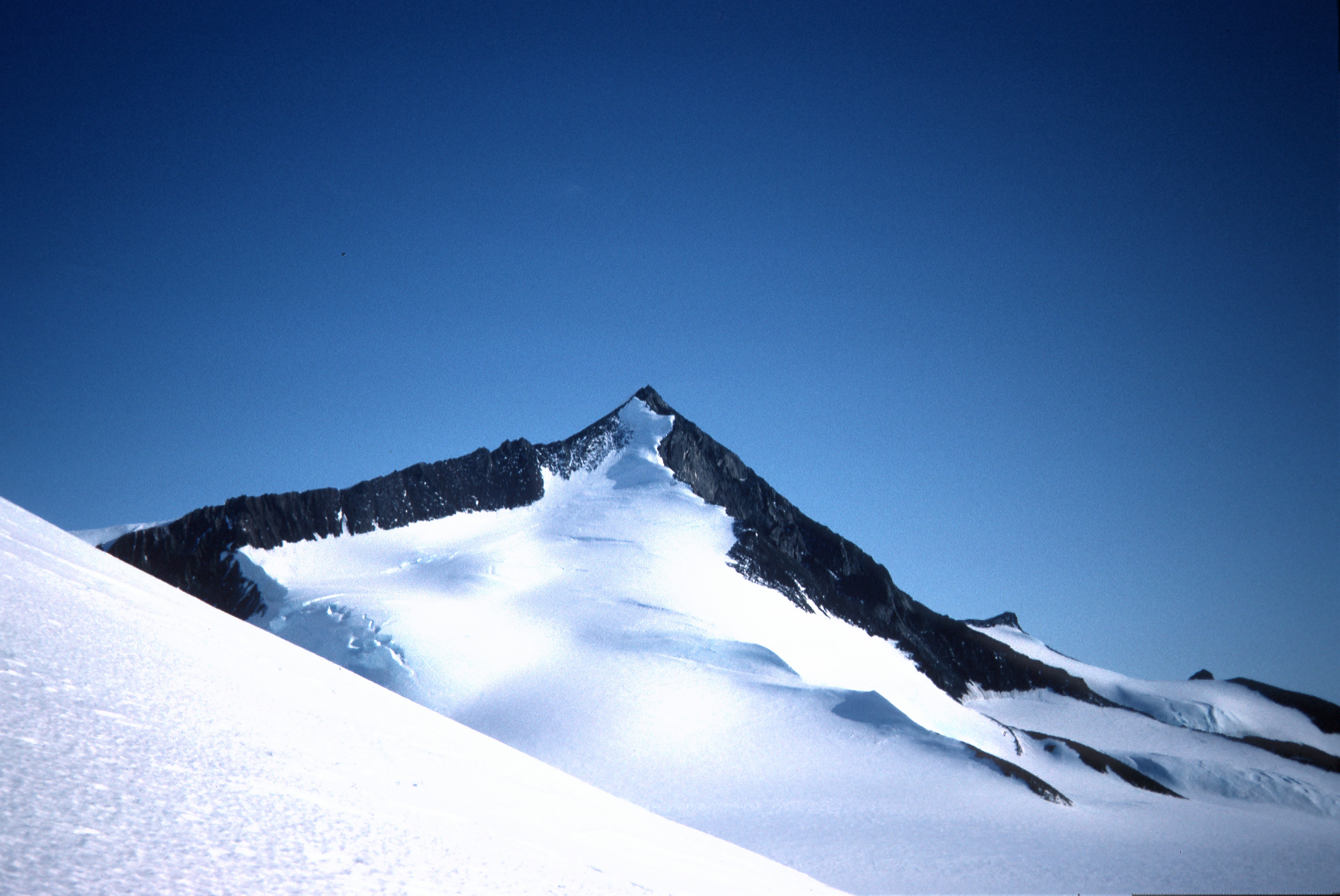
Mount Alpheratz

Mount Alpheratz (70°59′S 66°58′W) is a prominent peak on the southeast ridge of the Pegasus Mountains, about ten nautical miles (18 km) east-northeast of Gurney Point on the west coast of Palmer Land. Named by the United Kingdom Antarctic Place-Names Committee (UK-APC) after the star Alpheratz in the Great Square of Pegasus.
