= Canopus Crags =

Cluster of peaks in Antarctica

The Canopus Crags (71°10′S 66°38′W) are a cluster of peaks of 3 nautical miles (6 km) extent, located between Vela Bluff and Carina Heights along the south side of Ryder Glacier, in Palmer Land. They were named by the UK Antarctic Place-Names Committee after the star Canopus in the constellation of Carina.
