= Mount Markab =

Mountain in Antarctica

Coordinates: 70°56′S 67°2′W

Mount Markab is a striking mountain in Antarctica, with a pointed peak which provides a notable landmark. It is located on the north side of the Pegasus Mountains, about 10 nautical miles (19 km) northeast of Gurney Point, on the west coast of Palmer Land. The mountain was named by the UK Antarctic Place-Names Committee after the star Markab in the constellation of Pegasus.
