= Brennecke Nunataks =

Nunatak group in Palmer Land, Antarctica

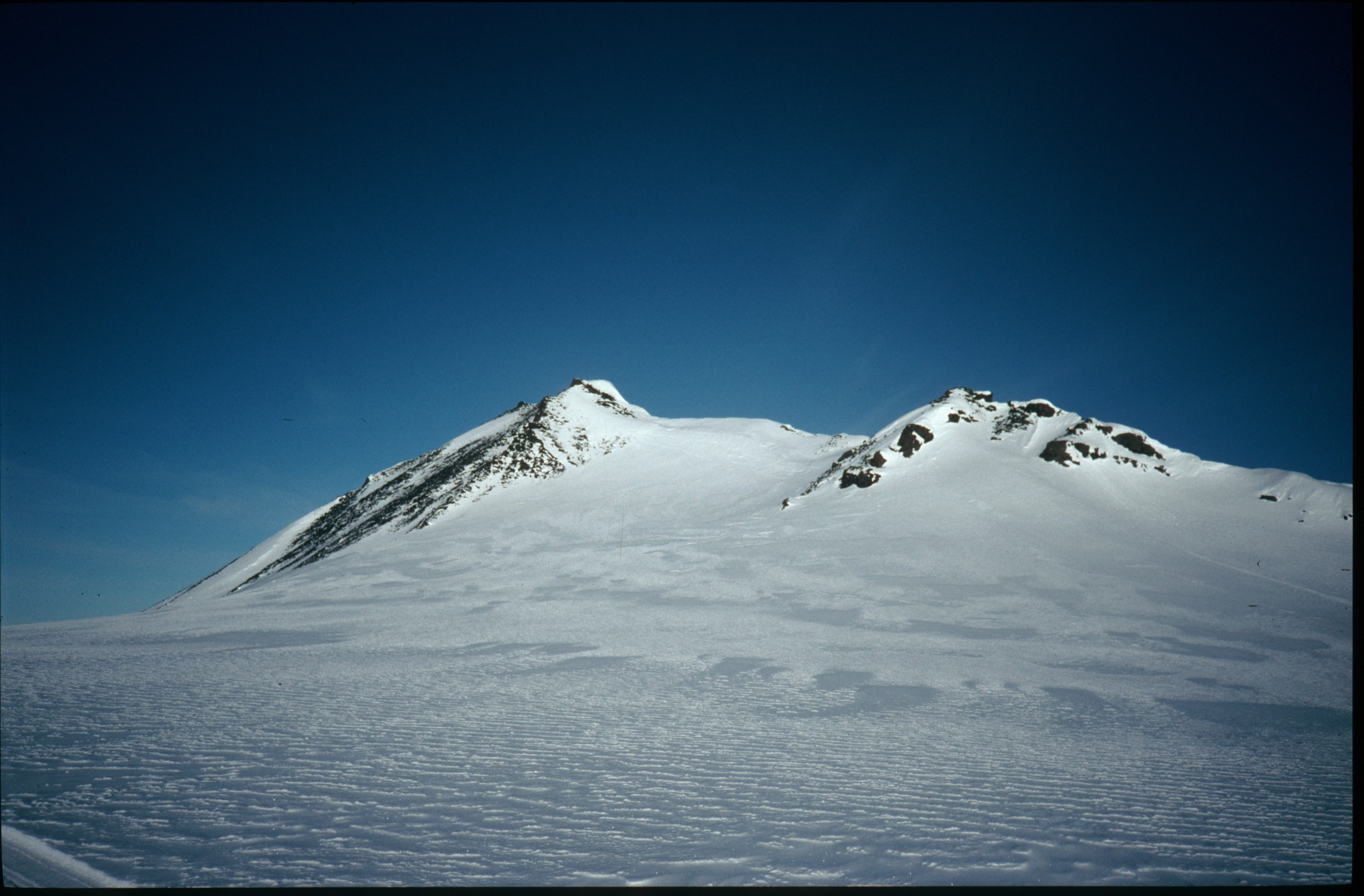
Brennecke Nunataks

The Brennecke Nunataks (72°14′S 63°35′W) are a group of large nunataks on the north side of the head of Beaumont Glacier, to the southwest of the Holmes Hills in south-central Palmer Land. They were mapped by the United States Geological Survey from aerial photographs taken by the U.S. Navy, 1966–69. In association with the names of oceanographers grouped in this area, the group was named by the UK Antarctic Place-Names Committee after Carl Wilhelm A. Brennecke (1875–1924), German oceanographer; member of the staff of Deutsche Seewarte (German Maritime Observatory), 1904–24; member of the Second German Antarctic Expedition, 1911–12.
