= Mount Crooker =

Mount Crooker (71°3′S 67°15′W) is a gable-shaped mountain with much exposed rock, located on the north side of Ryder Glacier and at the south end of the Pegasus Mountains, in Palmer Land. It was named by the Advisory Committee on Antarctic Names for Allen R. Crooker, a United States Antarctic Research Program biologist at Palmer Station in 1972.
