= Cetus Hill =

Coordinates: 70°56′S 66°10′W

Cetus Hill is a large ice-covered mound which comes to a point with three jagged rock peaks at its west end. It is located at the head of Ryder Glacier in western Palmer Land, about 27 nautical miles (50 km) east-northeast of Gurney Point. It was named by the UK Antarctic Place-Names Committee after the constellation of Cetus.
