= Vela Bluff =

Nunatak in Antarctica

Vela Bluff (71°10′S 66°56′W) is a large isolated nunatak which signposts the only known route across the lower part of Ryder Glacier. It is located 5 nautical miles (9 km) west of Canopus Crags and 11 nautical miles (20 km) from the west coast Palmer Land and was named by the United Kingdom Antarctic Place-Names Committee (UK-APC) after the constellation of Vela.
