= Condor Peninsula =

Peninsula located in Antarctica

- Location within Antarctica

Geography
- Location: Palmer Land, Antarctica
- Coordinates: 71°46′S 61°30′W

Condor Peninsula (71°46′S 61°30′W) is a mountainous, ice-covered peninsula, 30 nautical miles (56 km; 35 mi) long and 10 to 15 nautical miles (19 to 28 km; 12 to 17 mi) wide, between Odom Inlet and Hilton Inlet on the east coast of Palmer Land, Antarctica.

== Location ==
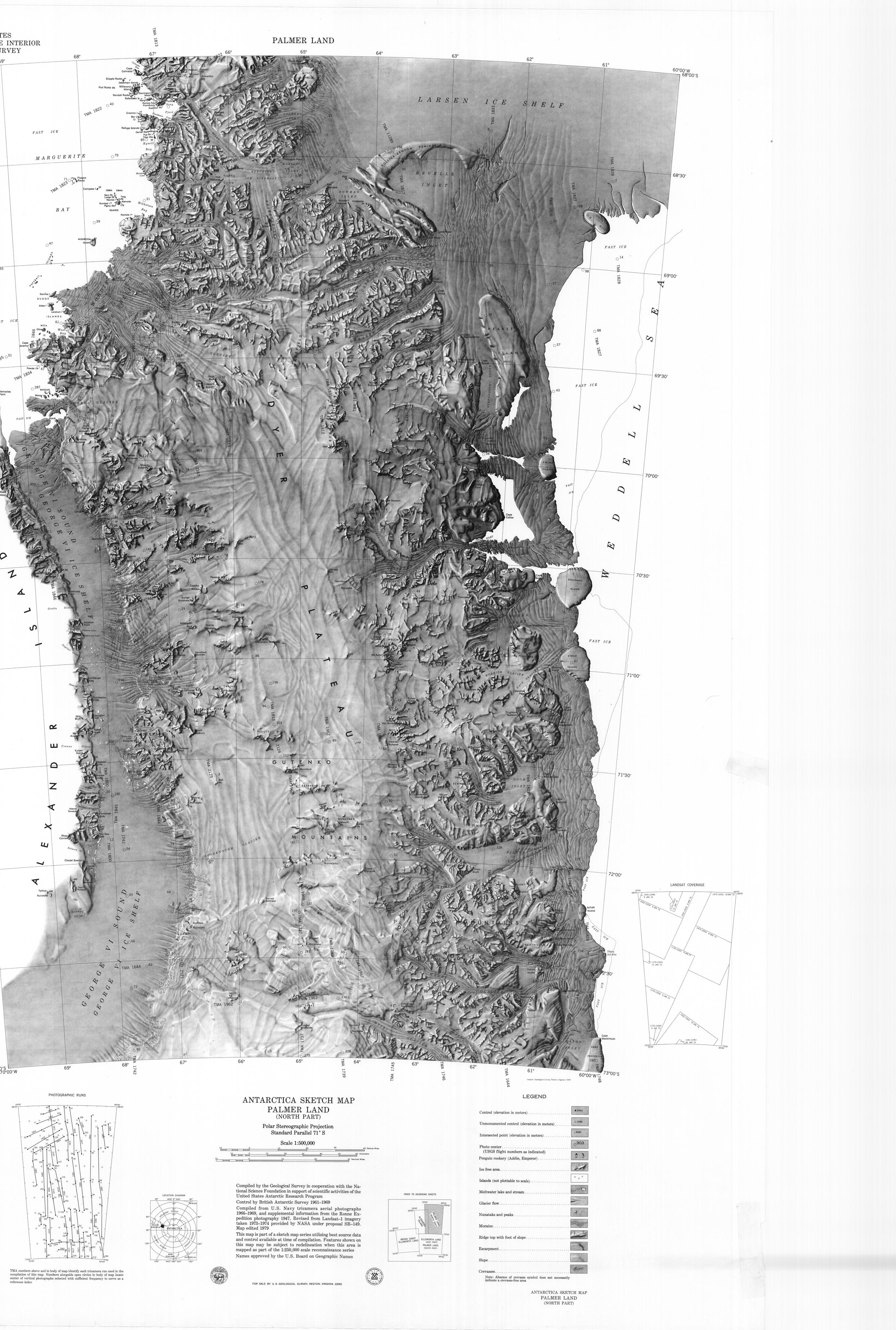
Northern Palmer Land. Condor Peninsula in southeast of map

The Condor Peninsula is on the Black Coast of Palmer Land, beside the Weddell Sea to the east. It is north of Hilton Inlet and south of Odom Inlet. To the southwest it is bounded by Kellogg Glacier, a left tributary of Gruening Glacier, which flows into Hilton Inlet. On the north it is bounded by Rankin Glacier, which joins Cline Glacier from the right and flows into Odom Inlet. Features, from west to east, include Boyer Spur, Angle Peak, Mount Showers, Cape MacDonald, Cadle Monolith and Cape Knowles. Features to the northwest include Kamenev Nunatak, Mount Whiting, the Schirmacher Massif and Mount Geier.

== Discovery and name ==
The Condor Peninsula was first observed and photographed from the air in the course of the United States Antarctic Service (USAS) "Condor" flight of December 30, 1940 from the East Base with Black, Snow, Perce, Carroll and Dyer aboard. It was named by the United States Advisory Committee on Antarctic Names after the twin-motored Curtiss-Wright Condor biplane in which personnel of USAS, 1939–41, made numerous photographic flights and flights of discovery over the Antarctic Peninsula, George VI Sound, Alexander Island, Charcot Island and the Bellingshausen Sea between latitudes 67°30′S and 74°0′S. The peninsula was mapped in detail by the United States Geological Survey (USGS) in 1974.

== Features ==
=== Angle Peak ===
71°45′S 62°03′W. A small but dominant peak that rises from one of the main spurs on the north side of Condor Peninsula. The feature stands close south of where Cline Glacier enters Odom Inlet. Mapped by the USGS in 1974. Named by the United States Advisory Committee on Antarctic Names (US-ACAN) for J. Phillip Angle, of the Smithsonian Institution, who made bird life observations off the west coast of South America (1965) and Antarctic areas southward to Marguerite Bay, Antarctic Peninsula (1966). He collaborated with George E. Watson in writing Birds of the Antarctic and Sub-Antarctic, 1975.

=== Mount Showers ===
71°45′S 61°28′W. A mountain rising above the Condor Peninsula, 13 nautical miles (24 km; 15 mi) southwest of Cape MacDonald, on the east coast of Palmer Land. Mapped by the USGS in 1974. Named by the US-ACAN for William Showers, USARP biologist at Palmer Station in 1975.

=== Cadle Monolith ===
71°40′S 60°58′W. A conspicuous, somewhat isolated, bare rock monolith or headland, standing at the east end of Condor Peninsula, 9 nautical miles (17 km; 10 mi) southeast of Cape MacDonald, on the east coast of Palmer Land. Mapped by the USGS in 1974. Named by the US-ACAN for Gary L. Cadle, CE2, United States Navy, electrician at Palmer Station in 1973.

=== Cape Hattersley-Smith ===
71°51′S 61°04′W. A cape marked by a triangular rock peak at the southeast end of Condor Peninsula, 5 nautical miles (9.3 km; 5.8 mi) southwest of Cape Knowles. The cape was photographed from the air by the USAS on December 30, 1940. It was surveyed by the FIDS-RARE (Falkland Islands Dependencies Survey–Ronne Antarctic Research Expedition) party from Stonington Island in November 1947 and was rephotographed by the United States Navy in 1966.

It was named by US-ACAN in 1984 after Geoffrey Francis Hattersley-Smith, with British Antarctic Survey (BAS) from 1973 (Secretary, UK Antarctic Place-Names Committee (UK-APC), 1975-91); FIDS Base Leader and glaciologist, Admiralty Bay, 1948-49; with Defense Research Board, Canada, 1951-73 (field research in the Arctic); author of The History of Place-names in the Falkland Islands Dependencies (South Georgia and the South Sandwich Islands), Cambridge, 1980, and The History of Place-names in the British Antarctic Territory, Cambridge, 1991.

== Northwest features ==
=== Kamenev Nunatak ===
71°41′S 63°00′W. A ridge-like nunatak located inland from Odom Inlet and 7 nautical miles (13 km; 8.1 mi) west of Mount Whiting. Mapped by USGS in 1974. Named by US-ACAN for Yevgeniy N. Kamenev, Soviet geologist who was an Exchange Scientist to the United States McMurdo Station in 1972. He participated as a member of the USGS geological and mapping party to the Lassiter Coast in 1972-73.

=== Mount Whiting ===
71°40′S 62°37′W. A pyramidal mountain, largely ice free and steep cliffed on the south side, standing at the southwest side of Rankin Glacier. Mapped by USGS in 1974. Named by US-ACAN for topographic engineer Ronald F. Whiting, a member of the USGS geological and mapping party to the'Lassiter Coast area, 1970-71.

=== Schirmacher Massif ===
71°37′S 62°20′W. An island-like mountain massif in the east part of Palmer Land. The feature is surrounded by the flow of the Rankin Glacier and Cline Glacier, 3 nautical miles (5.6 km; 3.5 mi) west of Rowley Massif. Mapped by USGS in 1974. Named by US-ACAN for Eberhard G. Schirmacher, topographic engineer, leader of the USGS topographic party on two expeditions to the Lassiter Coast, 1969-70 and 1970-71. He was USGS party leader to Pine Island Bay, 1974-75.

=== Mount Geier ===
71°34′S 62°25′W. The dominant, largely snow-covered peak in the north part of Schirmacher Massif. Mapped by USGS in 1974. Named by US-ACAN for Frederick J. Geier, topographic engineer with the USGS geological and mapping party to Lassiter Coast, 1969-70.

=== Waitt Peaks ===
71°29′S 62°34′W. A cluster of pointed peaks, mostly snow covered, at the southwest end of a large horseshoe-shaped ridge. Located 4 nautical miles (7.4 km; 4.6 mi) northwest of Schirmacher Massif. Mapped by USGS in 1974. Named by US-ACAN for geologist Richard B. Waitt, a member of the USGS geological and mapping party to the Lassiter Coast, 1972-73.

== Sources ==
- Alberts, Fred G., ed. (1995), Geographic Names of the Antarctic (PDF) (2 ed.), United States Board on Geographic Names This article incorporates public domain material from websites or documents of the United States Board on Geographic Names.
- Palmer Land, USGS: United States Geological Survey

This article incorporates public domain material from websites or documents of the United States Geological Survey.
