= Merz Peninsula =

Peninsula located in Antarctica

- Location within Antarctica

Geography
- Location: Palmer Land, Antarctica
- Coordinates: 72°15′S 61°5′W

The Merz Peninsula (72°15′S 61°5′W) is an irregular, ice-covered peninsula, about 15 nautical miles (28 km; 17 mi) long in an east–west direction and averaging 25 nautical miles (46 km; 29 mi) wide, between Hilton Inlet and Violante Inlet on the east coast of Palmer Land, Antarctica.

== Location ==
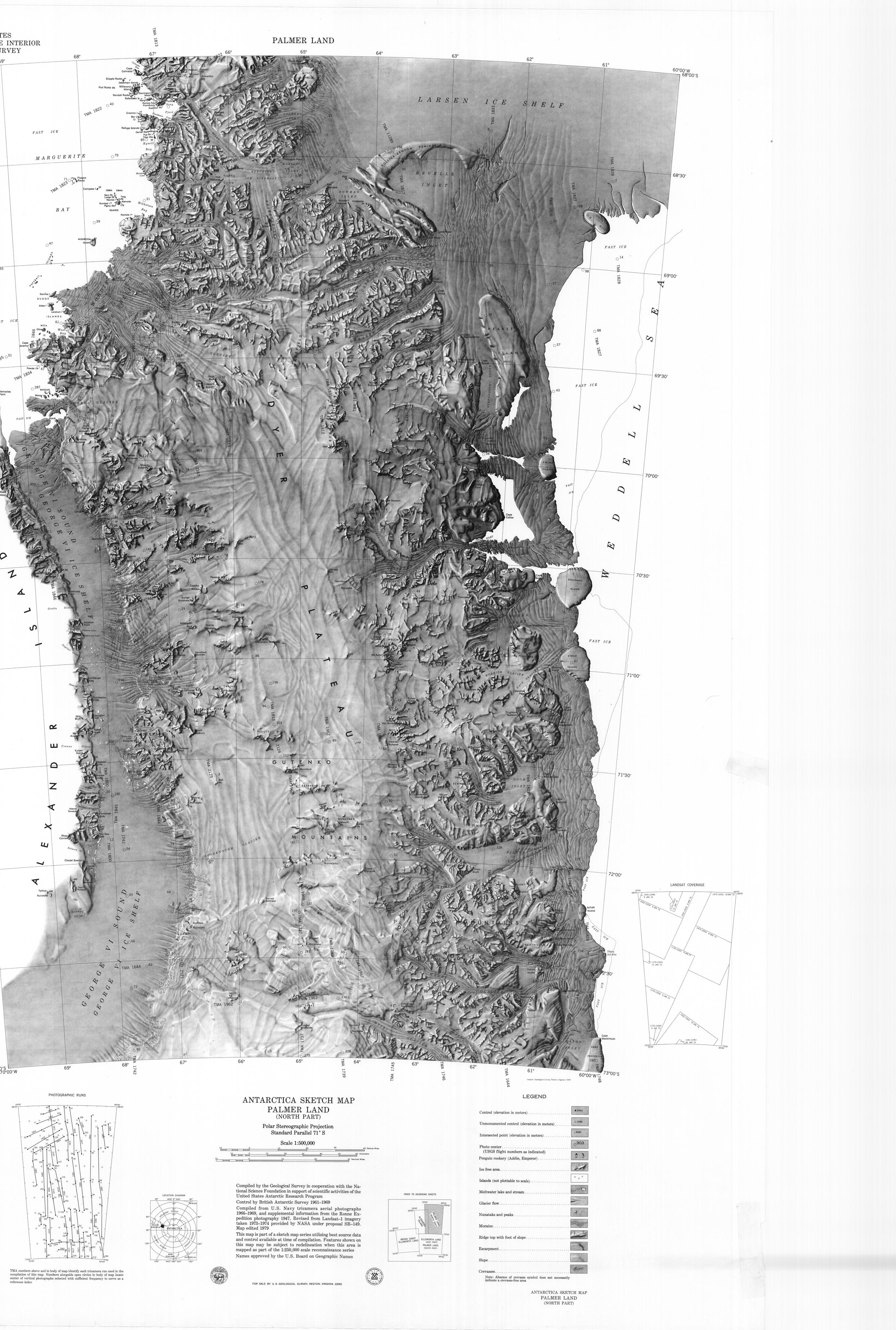
Northern Palmer Land. Merz Peninsula in southeast of map

The Merz Peninsula is on the Black Coast of Palmer Land, beside the Weddell Sea to the east. It is south of Hilton Inlet and north of Violante Inlet. The Wilson Mountains and Hjort Massif are to the northwest. The Spiess Glacier runs north from the west side of the peninsula into Hilton Inlet. The Böhnecke Glacier runs southeast along the south side of the peninsula into Violante Inlet. Features, from north to south, include Cape Darlington, Schott Inlet, Flagon Point, Cape Christmas, Wüst Inlet, Old Mans Head and Cape Fanning.

== Discovery and name ==
The Merz Peninsula was discovered and photographed from the air in December 1940 by the United States Antarctic Service (USAS). During 1947 it was photographed from the air by the Ronne Antarctic Research Expedition(RARE) under Finn Ronne, who in conjunction with the Falkland Islands Dependencies Survey (FIDS) charted it from the ground. The peninsula was named by the FIDS for Alfred Merz (1880-1925), a noted oceanographer and the original leader of the German expedition in the Meteor, 1925–26.

== Features ==
=== Schott Inlet ===
72°10′S 60°52′W. A small ice-filled inlet indenting the east side of Merz Peninsula close south of Cape Darlington. Discovered and photographed from the air in December 1940 by the USAS. Charted in 1947 by a joint party consisting of members of the RARE under Ronne and the FIDS. Named by the FIDS for Gerhard Schott, internationally known German oceanographer.

=== Flagon Point ===
72°14′S 60°41′W. , A point surmounted by two peaks, 295 and 395 metres (968 and 1,296 ft) high, marking the south side of the entrance to Schott Inlet. Discovered and photographed from the air in December 1940 by members of the USAS. It was charted in 1947 by a joint party consisting of members of the RARE and FIDS. So named by the FIDS because the two peaks are suggestive of a flagon tilted on its side when viewed from north or south.

=== Cape Christmas ===
72°20′S 60°41′W. Abrupt rock cape which rises to 320 metres (1,050 ft) high, marking the north side of the entrance to Wüst Inlet. Discovered and photographed from the air in December 1940 by the USAS. During 1947 it was photographed from the air by the RARE under Ronne, who in conjunction with the FIDS charted it from the ground. So named by the FIDS because the joint party in 1947 spent Christmas Day in this vicinity.

=== Wüst Inlet ===
72°20′S 60°50′W. An ice-filled inlet, from 2 to 5 nautical miles (3.7 to 9.3 km; 2.3 to 5.8 mi) wide, indenting the east side of Merz Peninsula between Cape Christmas and Old Mans Head. The inlet was photographed from the air in 1940 by members of the USAS. During 1947 the inlet was photographed from the air by members of the RARE, who in conjunction with the FIDS charted it from the ground. Named by the FIDS for Professor Georg Wüst, German oceanographer.

=== Old Mans Head ===
72°22′S 60°45′W. A dark headland marking the south side of the entrance to Wüst Inlet. Discovered and photographed from the air in December 1940 by members of the US AS. During 1947 the headland was photographed from the air by the RARE, who in conjunction with the FIDS charted it from the ground. This descriptive name was given by the FIDS.

== Nearby features ==
=== Butler Island ===
72°13′S 60°08′W. A circular, ice-covered island 6 nautical miles (11 km; 6.9 mi) wide which rises to 185 metres (607 ft) high, lying 7 nautical miles (13 km; 8.1 mi) east of Merz Peninsula. Discovered and photographed from the air in December 1940 by the USAS. During 1947 it was photographed from the air by the RARE, who in conjunction with the FIDS charted it from the ground. Named by the FIDS for K.S.P. Butler, FIDS commander in 1947–48.

=== Wilson Mountains ===
72°15′S 61°50′W. A group of mountains including Hjort Massif, rising to about 1,600 metres (5,200 ft) high to the west of Merz Peninsula. The feature is bounded to the west by Du Toit Mountains, to north by Beaumont Glacier and Hilton Inlet, and to south by Defant Glacier. First photographed from the air by USAS, 1940. Mapped by the United States Geological Survey (USGS) from United States Navy aerial photographs taken 1966-69. In association with the names of continental drift scientists grouped in this area, named by the United States Advisory Committee on Antarctic Names (US-ACAN) after John Tuzo Wilson (1908-93), Canadian geophysicist who visited Antarctica on United States Navy Operation Deep Freeze, 1958; Professor of Geophysics, University of Toronto, 1946-74; Director-General, Ontario Science Centre, 1974-85.

=== Hjort Massif ===
72°08′S 61°25′W. A salient mountain rising to about 1,000 metres (3,300 ft) high at the northeast end of the Wilson Mountains, on the south side of Hilton Inlet. Photographed from the air by USAS, 1940. Mapped by USGS from aerial photographs taken by the United States Navy, 1966-69. Surveyed by the British Antarctic Survey (BAS), 1974-75. Named by the UK Antarctic Place-Names Committee (UK-APC) in 1977 after Johan Hjort (1869-1948), Professor of Marine Biology, University of Oslo, 1920-39; Chairman of the International Whaling Committee, 1926-39.

== Sources ==
- Alberts, Fred G., ed. (1995), Geographic Names of the Antarctic (PDF) (2 ed.), United States Board on Geographic Names This article incorporates public domain material from websites or documents of the United States Board on Geographic Names.
- Palmer Land, USGS: United States Geological Survey

This article incorporates public domain material from websites or documents of the United States Geological Survey.
