= Holmes Hills =

The Holmes Hills (72°8′S 63°25′W) are a group of ridges and nunataks rising to about 1,700 metres (5,600 ft) between Runcorn Glacier and Beaumont Glacier, bounded to the southwest by the Brennecke Nunataks, in south-central Palmer Land, Antarctica. They were mapped by the United States Geological Survey from aerial photographs taken by the U.S. Navy, 1966–69, and surveyed by the British Antarctic Survey, 1972–73. In association with the names of continental drift scientists grouped in this area, the hills were named by the Advisory Committee on Antarctic Names in 1978 after Scottish geologist Arthur Holmes, Professor of Geology at the University of Edinburgh, 1943–56.
