= Hess Mountains =

Group of mountains in Palmer Land, Antarctica

The Hess Mountains (72°0′S 62°30′W) are a group of mountains rising to about 1,500 metres (5,000 ft) at the head of Hilton Inlet on the Black Coast of Antarctica, to the west of Dietz Bluff and bounded to the north by Gruening Glacier, to the west by Runcorn Glacier and to the south by Beaumont Glacier. The mountains were first photographed from the air by the United States Antarctic Service, 1940, and were mapped by the United States Geological Survey from aerial photographs taken by the U.S. Navy, 1966–69. They were surveyed by the British Antarctic Survey, 1972–73, and, in association with the names of continental drift scientists grouped in this area, named by the Advisory Committee on Antarctic Names, 1978, after the American Harry H. Hess, Professor of Geology at Princeton University, 1948–69.
