= Owen Peak =

Mountain in Antarctica

Owen Peak (71°53′S 63°8′W) is a peak standing inland from Hilton Inlet, eastern Palmer Land, on the south side of Gruening Glacier. Discovered from the air during a flight of the Ronne Antarctic Research Expedition (RARE) (1947–48) on November 21, 1947, and named "Mount Russell Owen" after the New York Times correspondent, Russell Owen with the first Byrd Antarctic Expedition, 1928–30. The name was later shortened and changed to its present form by Advisory Committee on Antarctic Names (US-ACAN).
