= Pegasus Mountains =

Mountain range in Palmer Land, Antarctica

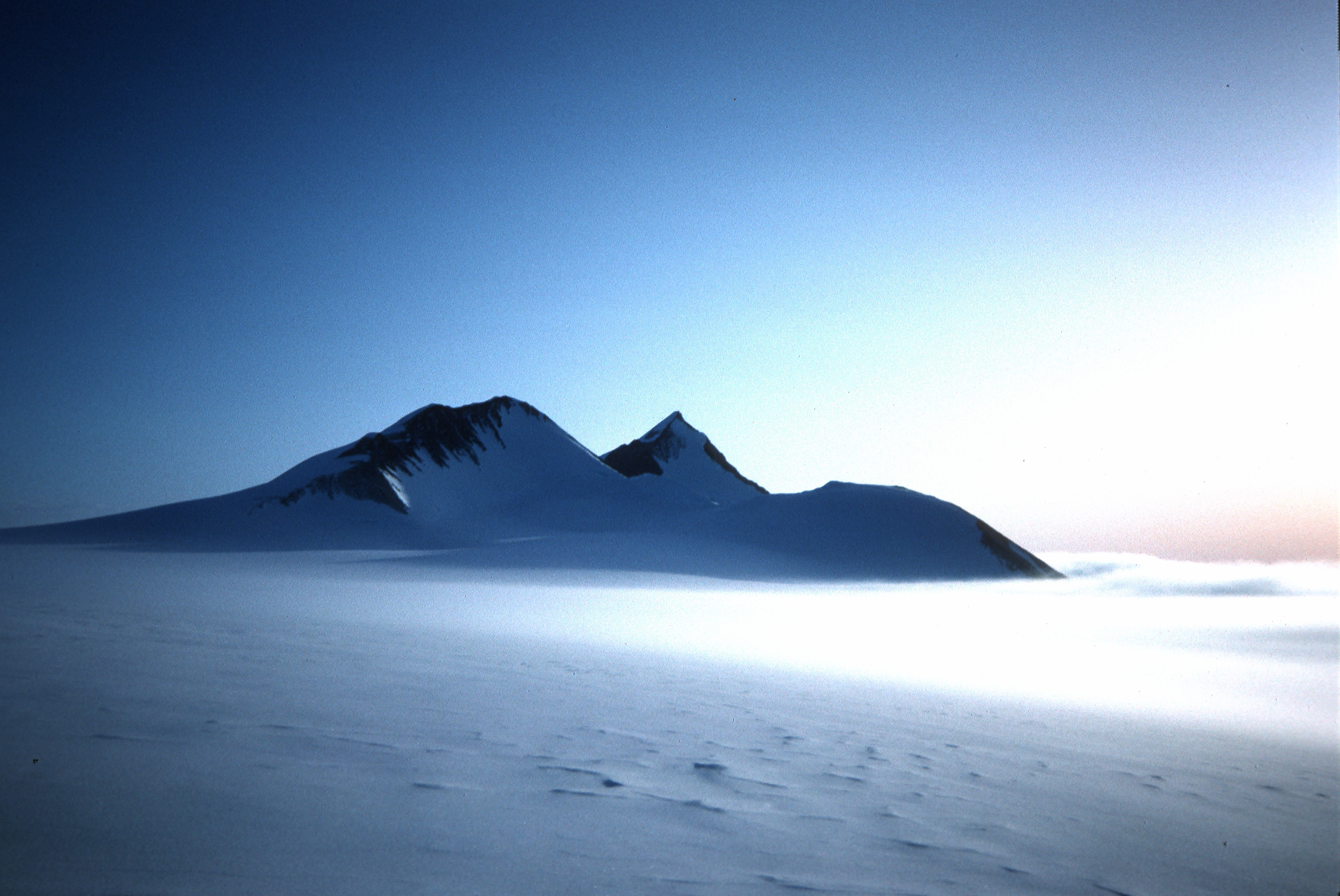
Pegasus Mountains sunset

Pegasus Mountains (71°0′S 67°12′W) is a mountain range, 16 nautical miles (30 km) long, consisting of a system of ridges and peaks broken by two passes. Located between Bertram and Ryder Glaciers and immediately east of Gurney Point on the west coast of Palmer Land, Antarctica. Named by United Kingdom Antarctic Place-Names Committee (UK-APC) after the constellation of Pegasus.

== Peaks ==
- Fomalhaut Nunatak
- Mount Crooker
- Mount Markab
