= Odom Inlet =

Body of water in Palmer Land, Antarctica

- Location within Antarctica
- Location: Black Coast, Antarctic Peninsula, Antarctica
- Coordinates: 71°30′S 61°20′W
- Type: Inlet
- Ocean/sea sources: Weddell Sea

Odom Inlet (71°30′S 61°20′W) is an ice-filled inlet 9 nautical miles (17 km; 10 mi) long, between Cape Howard and Cape MacDonald along the east coast of Palmer Land, Antarctica.

== Location ==
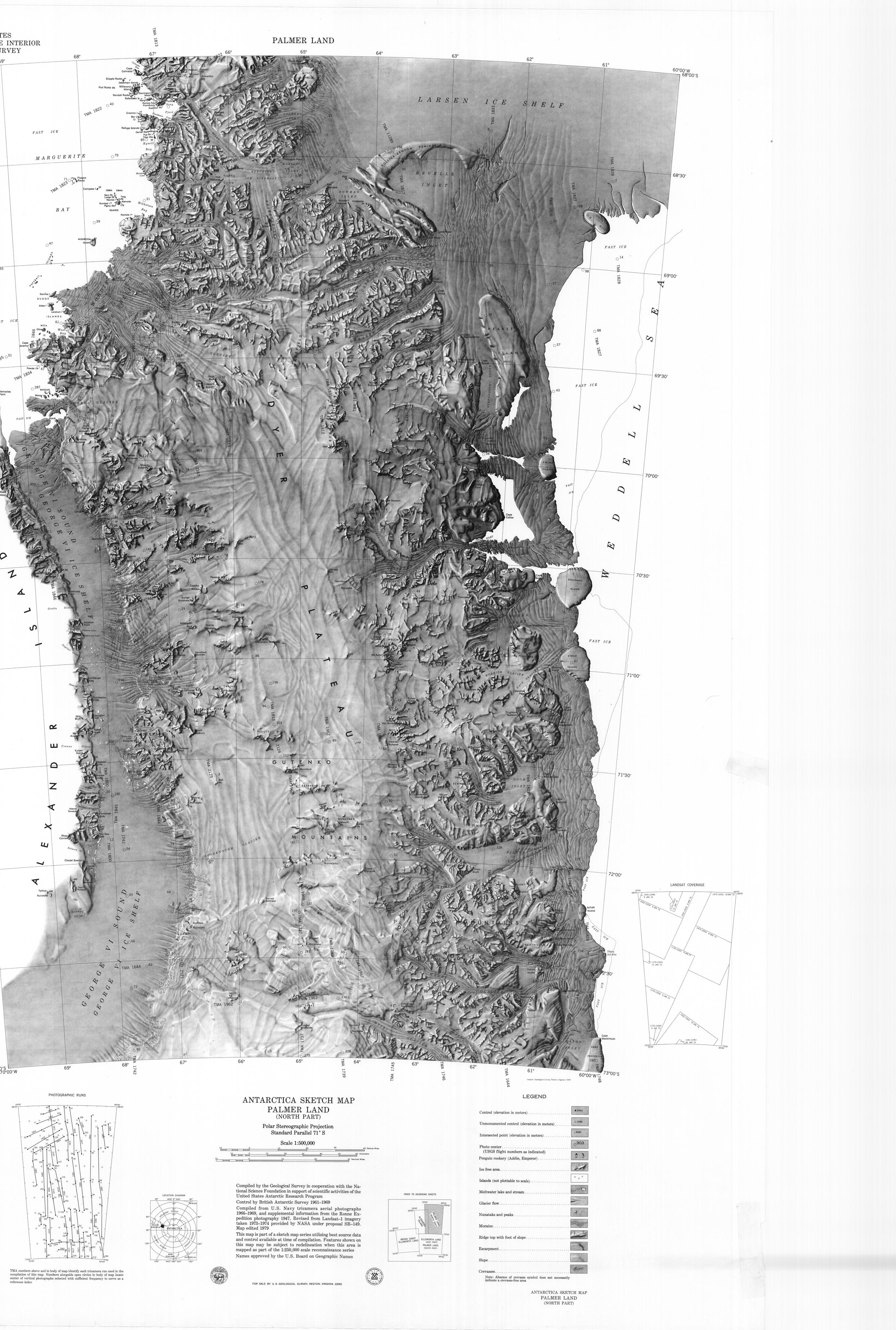
Northern Palmer Land. Odom Inlet in southeast of map

Odom Inlet of the Weddell Sea is on the east coast of Palmer Land, on the Black Coast of the Antarctic Peninsula. It is north of Hilton Inlet and south of Lehrke Inlet. The Condor Peninsula is to the south, the Rowley Massif to the west and the Snyder Peninsula to the north. It is fed by the Rankin Glacier and Cline Glacier from the west, and by the Haley Glacier, Soto Glacier and Muus Glacier from the northwest. Its mouth is between Cape Howard to the north and Cape MacDonald to the south.

== Discovery and name ==
Odom Inlet was discovered by members of the United States Antarctic Service (USAS) who explored this coast from East Base both by land and from the air in 1940, and named for Howard Odom, radio operator at the East Base.

== Features ==
=== Rankin Glacier ===
71°41′S 62°15′W. A glacier about 12 nautical miles (22 km; 14 mi) long on the east side of Palmer Land. It flows southeast and then east along the south side of Schirmacher Massif to join the Cline Glacier just inland from the head of Odom Inlet. Mapped by the United States Geological Survey (USGS) in 1974. Named by the United States Advisory Committee on Antarctic Names (US-ACAN) for John S. Rankin, United States Antarctic Research Program (USARP) biologist on the International Weddell Sea Oceanographic Expeditions, 1968 and 1969.

=== Cline Glacier ===
71°40′S 62°00′W. A large glacier that drains the vicinity at the east side of Mount Jackson and flows generally southeast between Schirmacher Massif and Rowley Massif into the head of Odom Inlet. Mapped by USGS in 1974. Named by US-ACAN for David R. Cline, USARP biologist on the International Weddell Sea Oceanographic Expeditions in 1968 and 1969.

=== Haley Glacier ===
71°33′S 61°50′W. A glacier, 8 nautical miles (15 km; 9.2 mi) long, draining southeast along the north side of Rowley Massif into Odom Inlet. Mapped by USGS in 1974. Named by US-ACAN for Philip H. Haley, USARP biologist at Palmer Station, 1973.

=== Soto Glacier ===
71°31′S 61°46′W. A glacier about 12 nautical miles (22 km; 14 mi) long, draining southeast along the southwest side of Strømme Ridge and discharging into Odom Inlet. Mapped by USGS in 1974. Named by US-ACAN for Luis R. Soto, Argentine oceanographer on the International Weddell Sea Oceanographic Expeditions, 1968 and 1970.

=== Muus Glacier ===
71°26′S 61°36′W. A glacier entering the north side of Odom Inlet between Snyder Peninsula and Strømme Ridge. Mapped by the USGS in 1974. Named by US-ACAN for David Muus, USARP oceanographer aboard USCGC Northwind in the Ross Sea area, 1971-72, and a participant in the Weddell Sea Oceanographic Investigations aboard USCGC Glacier, 1974-75.

=== Cape Howard ===
71°25′S 61°08′W. A high, flat-topped, snow-covered cape at the extremity of the peninsula separating Lamplugh Inlet and Odom Inlet. Discovered by members of the USAS who explored along this coast by land and from the air in 1940. Named by the US-ACAN for August Howard, founder of the American Polar Society and editor of the Polar Times.

=== Cape MacDonald ===
71°32′S 61°11′W. A headland which rises to 435 metres (1,427 ft) high, forming the south side of the entrance to Odom Inlet, on the east coast of Palmer Land. Discovered by members of the USAS who explored this area by land and from the air in 1940, and named for I.E. MacDonald, field representative and secretary of the USAS.

== Sources ==
- Alberts, Fred G., ed. (1995), Geographic Names of the Antarctic (PDF) (2 ed.), United States Board on Geographic Names This article incorporates public domain material from websites or documents of the United States Board on Geographic Names.
- Palmer Land, USGS: United States Geological Survey

This article incorporates public domain material from websites or documents of the United States Geological Survey.
