= Mandolin Hills =

Antarctic area

- Location within Antarctica

Highest point
- Coordinates: 69°55′S 67°20′W

Geography
- Location: Palmer Land, Antarctica

The Mandolin Hills are an isolated group of nunataks which rise 300 metres (1,000 ft) above the ice, 9 nautical miles (17 km) east of Mount Noel, Traverse Mountains, in northwestern Palmer Land, Antarctica. The group was so named by the UK Antarctic Place-Names Committee in 1977 from its shape when viewed in plan suggestive of a mandolin.
