= Mount Pitman =

Mountain in Palmer Land, Antarctica

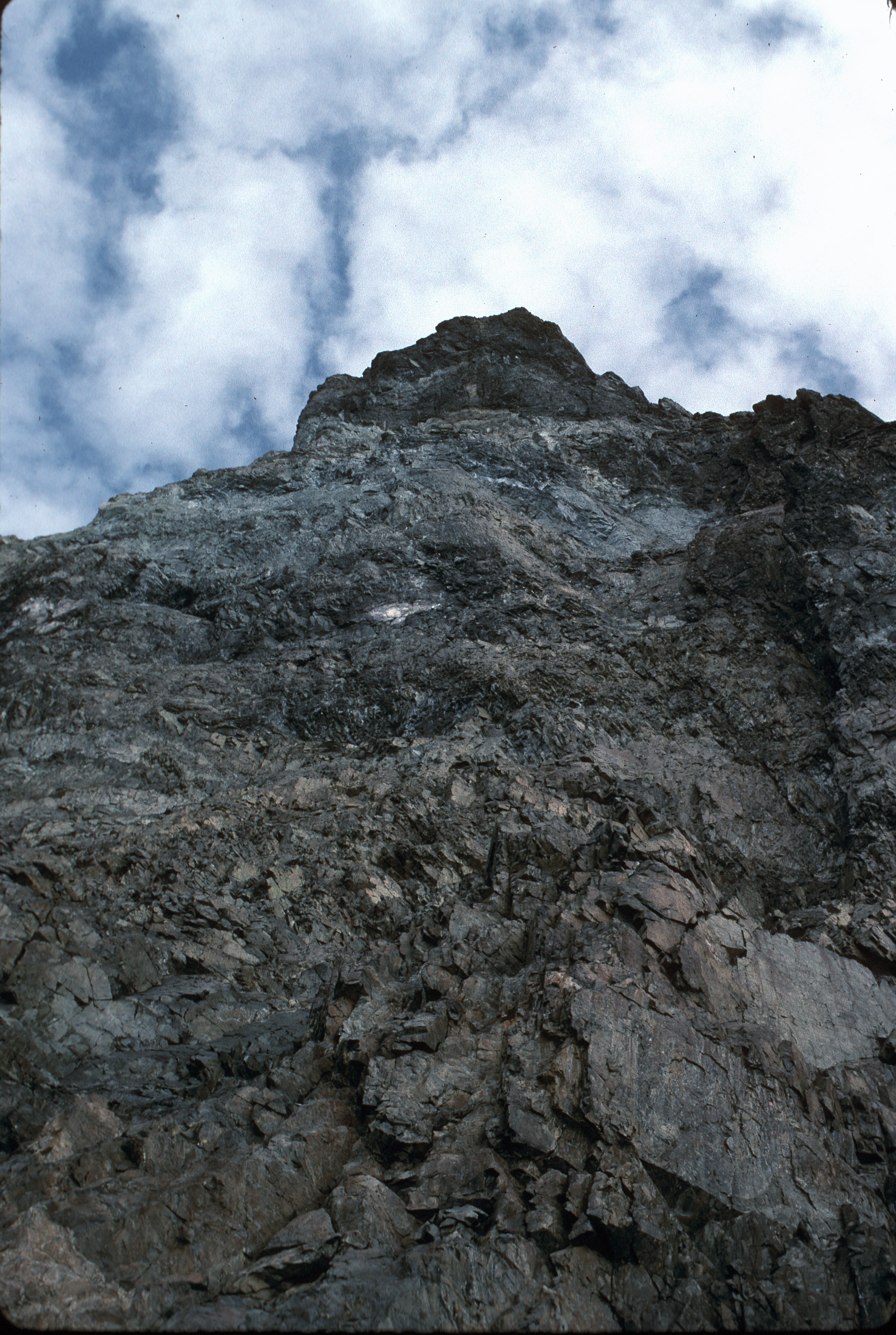
Mount Pitman face in felsic volcanics

Mount Pitman (70°9′S 67°42′W) is a mountain in Antarctica. It features two mainly ice-covered, dome-shaped summits, the higher and northern rising to 1,830 m, standing 9 nautical miles (17 km) inland from George VI Sound, between Riley and Chapman Glaciers on the west coast of Palmer Land. First surveyed in 1936 by the British Graham Land Expedition (BGLE) under Rymill. Named by the United Kingdom Antarctic Place-Names Committee (UK-APC) in 1954 for E.L. Pitman, an airplane carpenter of Byfleet, Surrey, who made the sledges used by the BGLE, 1934–37, introducing important new elements into the design of the Nansen-type sledge.
