= Russell Owen =

American journalist

Russell D. Owen (January 8, 1889 – April 3, 1952) was an American journalist employed by The New York Times. He covered Arctic and Antarctic exploration both as a reporter and in books. Owen Peak, originally named "Mount Russell Owen," was named in his honor after having traveled as a Times correspondent with the first Byrd Antarctic Expedition (1928-30).

== Life ==
Born 1889 in Chicago, Owen worked for The Sun of New York City from 1906 to 1920. He and Ethel J. McGregor married in 1913. She died in 1948. They had one daughter.

After short stints elsewhere, Owen moved to The New York Times in 1921 and returned in 1926 after two years running the General Electric news bureau.

That year he covered the air race to the North Pole, flying with Roald Amundsen (airship Norge) as far as Ny-Ålesund, Svalbard and meeting Richard Evelyn Byrd there. (Ny-Ålesund was the northernmost point of departure for both.)

Owen joined the First Byrd Antarctic Expedition of 1928–1930. He submitted graphic radio dispatches that were printed in many newspapers and won the annual Pulitzer Prize for Reporting in 1930 citing the 1929 portion of that work. He also appeared in the documentary film With Byrd at the South Pole (Paramount, 1930). His book about the expedition was published in 1934, entitled South of the Sun, and he wrote two more polar books later.

== Books ==
- South of the Sun (The John Day Company, 1934) (some edition, ISBN 978-1432577667)
- Antarctic Ocean (McGraw-Hill, 1941)
- The Conquest of the North and South Poles: adventures of the Peary and Byrd expeditions (Random House, 1952), illustrated by Lynd Ward

== See also ==
- List of Antarctic expeditions
- List of Arctic expeditions
