= Kemp Peninsula =

Ice-covered peninsula in Antarctica

- Location within Antarctica

Geography
- Location: Palmer Land, Antarctica
- Coordinates: 73°8′S 60°15′W

Kemp Peninsula (73°8′S 60°15′W) is an irregular ice-covered peninsula 26 nautical miles (48 km; 30 mi) long in a north–south direction and 5 to 12 nautical miles (9.3 to 22.2 km; 5.8 to 13.8 mi) wide. The peninsula rises gently to 305 metres (1,001 ft) and projects east between the heads of Mason Inlet and Mossman Inlet, on the east coast of Palmer Land, Antarctica.

== Location ==
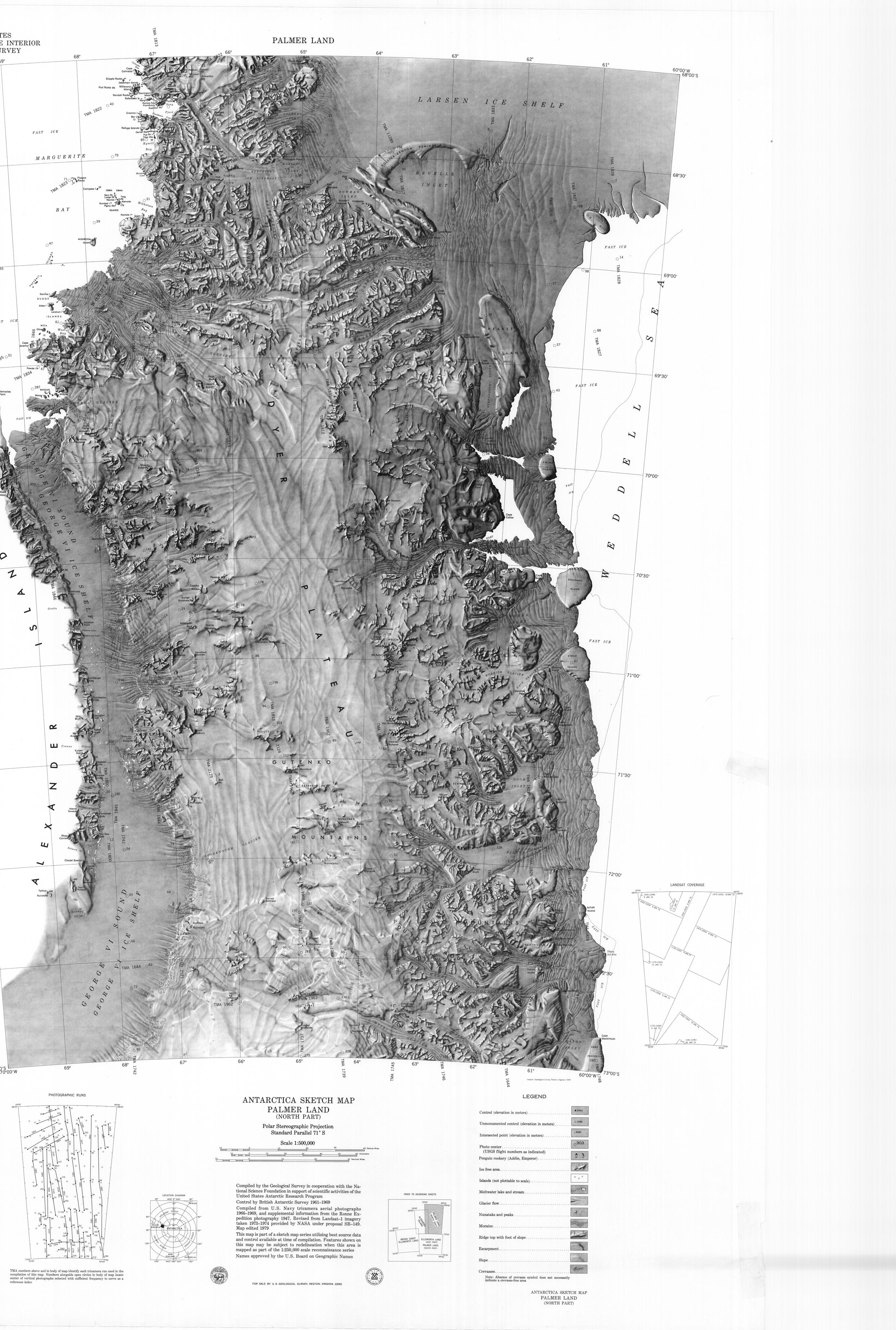
Palmer Land. Northof Kemp Peninsula in southeast of map

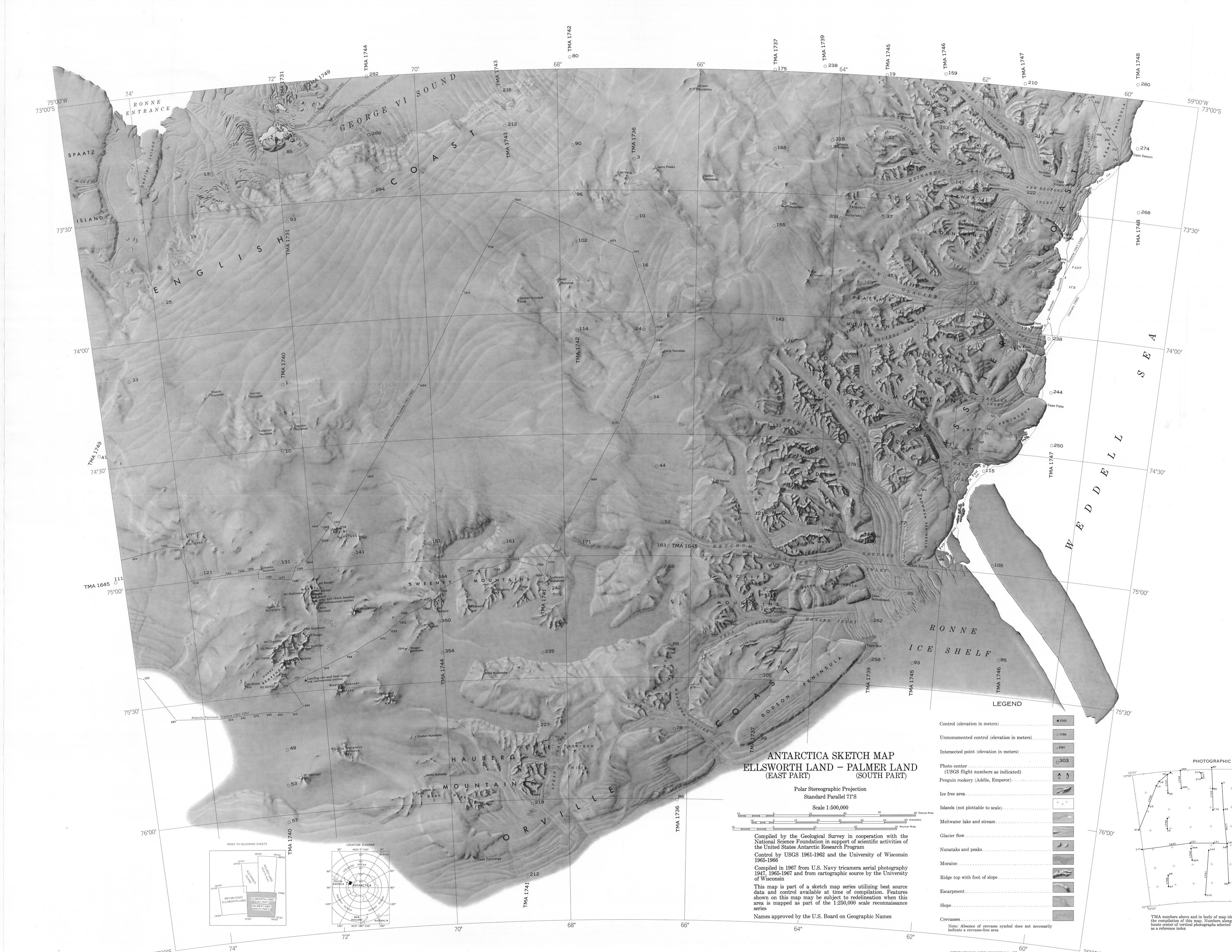
Eastern Ellsworth Land (south), Southern Palmer Land (north). South of Kemp Peninsula in northeast of map.

The Kemp Peninsula is on the Lassiter Coast of southern Palmer Land, beside the Weddell Sea to the east. Mason Inlet is to the north, fed by Clowes Glacier. The coastal ice sheet extends north from Mason Inlet to Cape Herdman, at the south of the mouth of Violante Inlet. The northern point of the peninsula is Cape Mackintosh. The Wegener Range is to the east. Cape Deacon is near the southern point. Mossman Inlet is to the south, just north of New Bedford Inlet and east of Mount Pawson and Mohn Peaks on the mainland.

== Discovery and name ==
Kemp Peninsula was first seen from the air in December 1940 by members of the United States Antarctic Service (USAS), who at that time photographed all but its northern extremity. During 1947 it was photographed from the air by the Ronne Antarctic Research Expedition (RARE), who in conjunction with the Falkland Islands Dependencies Survey (FIDS) charted it from the ground. It was named by the FIDS for Stanley W. Kemp, a British marine biologist and oceanographer, first Director of Research of the Discovery Investigations, 1924–36, and Director of the Plymouth Marine Laboratory, 1936–45.

== Features ==
=== Clowes Glacier ===
72°56′S 60°41′W. A glacier 2 nautical miles (3.7 km; 2.3 mi) wide, which flows east to enter Mason Inlet. Discovered and photographed from the air in December 1940 by the US AS. During 1947 it was photographed from the air by the RARE under Ronne, who in conjunction with the FIDS charted it from the ground. Named by the FIDS for Archibald J. Clowes.

=== Mason Inlet ===
72°57′S 60°25′W. Ice-filled inlet which recedes 15 nautical miles (28 km; 17 mi) southwest between Cape Mackintosh and the coastline south of Cape Herdman, along the east coast of Palmer Land. First seen and photographed from the air in December 1940 by members of the USAS. During 1947 the inlet was photographed from the air by the RARE, who in conjunction with the FIDS charted it from the ground. Named by the FIDS for D.P. Mason, their surveyor on the joint British-American sledge journey during the charting of this coast in 1947.

=== Cape Mackintosh ===
72°50′S 59°54′W. A low, ice-covered cape forming the north tip of Kemp Peninsula and the east entrance point to Mason Inlet. Probably first seen by members of the USAS who photographed a portion of Kemp Peninsula while exploring this coast from the air in December 1940. During 1947 the cape was photographed by the RARE, which in conjunction with the FIDS surveyed it from the ground. Named by the FIDS after Neil A. Mackintosh (1900–74), British marine biologist, oceanographer, and authority on Antarctic whales; member of DI scientific staff from 1924 and Chief Scientific Officer, 1929–49; Deputy Director, National Institute of Oceanography (now Institute of Oceanographic Sciences), 1949-61.

=== Cape Deacon ===
73°14′S 59°50′W. An ice-covered cape forming the southeast tip of Kemp Peninsula. Probably first seen by members of the United States Antarctic Service (USAS) who photographed a portion of Kemp Peninsula while exploring this coast from the air in December 1940. During 1947 the cape was photographed from the air by members of the RARE, who in conjunction with the FIDS charted it from the ground. Named by the UK Antarctic Place-Names Committee (UK-APC) after George E.R. Deacon (1906–84), English oceanographer and member of the Discovery Investigations staff, 1927–39; Director of the National Institute of Oceanography, 1949-71.

=== Jeffries Bluff ===
73°18′S 60°13′W. The ice-covered south point of Kemp Peninsula on the Lassiter Coast. The feature was photographed from the air by the USAS in December 1940, surveyed by the joint RARE-FIDS sledge party in November 1947 and rephotographed by the United States Navy, 1965-67. In association with Cape Deacon to the northeast, named by the UK-APC in 1981 after Margaret Elsa Jeffries (Mrs. George Deacon), a member of the staff of the Discovery Committee, about 1930.

=== Mossman Inlet ===
73°17′S 60°32′W. Narrow ice-filled inlet which recedes north 10 nautical miles (19 km; 12 mi) between Cape Kidson and the southwest end of Kemp Peninsula. This inlet was first seen and photographed from the air in December 1940 by the USAS. During 1947 it was photographed from the air by the RARE under Ronne, who in conjunction with the FIDS charted it from the ground. Named by the FIDS for Robert C. Mossman, 1870-1940, British meteorologist and climatologist and member of the ScotNAE under Bruce, 1902-04.

=== Mount Pawson ===
73°10′S 61°01′W. A mountain 7 nautical miles (13 km; 8.1 mi) southeast of Mohn Peaks. First mapped by the FIDS-RARE joint sledge party of 1947-48. Remapped by the United States Geological Survey (USGS) from surveys and United States Navy air photos, 1961-67. Named by the United States Advisory Committee on Antarctic Names (US-ACAN) for David L. Pawson, biologist with the Palmer Station-Eastwind Expedition, summer 1965-66.

=== Mohn Peaks ===
73°07′S 61°15′W. Two ice-covered peaks, the northern and southern 1,275 metres (4,183 ft) high and 1,230 metres (4,040 ft) high, respectively, standing 9 nautical miles (17 km; 10 mi) west-southwest of the head of Mason Inlet. First seen and photographed from the air in December 1940 by the USAS. During 1947 the peaks were photographed from the air by the RARE under Finn Ronne, who in conjunction with the FIDS charted them from the ground. Named by the FIDS for Henrik Mohn.

== Sources ==
- Alberts, Fred G., ed. (1995), Geographic Names of the Antarctic (PDF) (2 ed.), United States Board on Geographic Names This article incorporates public domain material from websites or documents of the United States Board on Geographic Names.
- Ellsworth Land - Palmer Land, USGS: United States Geological Survey
- Palmer Land, USGS: United States Geological Survey

This article incorporates public domain material from websites or documents of the United States Geological Survey.
