= David N. Thomas (academic) =

British marine biologist

David N. Thomas FRSB FLSW
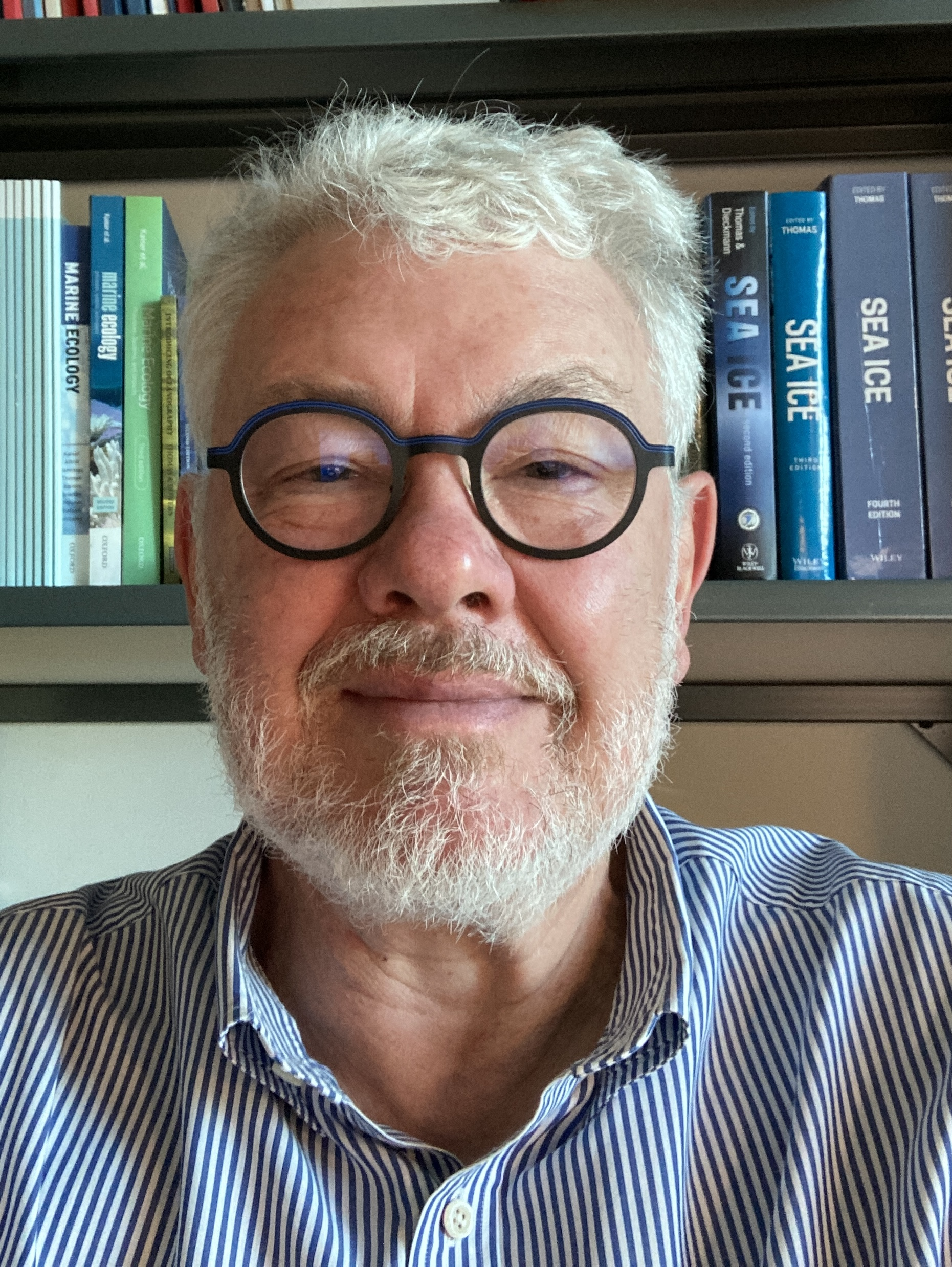
- Thomas in 2026
- Born: David Neville Thomas; 12 October 1962 (age 63)
- Education: Prior Park College - Guildford College
- Alma mater: University of Liverpool (BSc, PhD)
- Known for: Sea ice biology, Polar ecosystem research
- Scientific career
- Fields: Arctic ecosystems
- Workplaces: University of Helsinki
- Thesis: Salt Tolerances in Cladophora (Chlorophyceae): A Study of Populations and Species (1987)
- Doctoral advisor: George Russell and Julian C. Collins

David Neville Thomas (born 12 October 1962) is a British scientist who is currently the Professor of Arctic Ecosystems Research at the University of Helsinki.

== Education ==
Thomas was educated at Prior Park College in Bath, UK and at Guildford College. He went on to study at the University of Liverpool and graduated with a BSc in Environmental Science in 1984. In 1988, he received a PhD from the University of Liverpool for his thesis "Salt Tolerances in Cladophora (Chlorophyceae): A Study of Population and Species". He was supervised by Drs George Russell and Julian C. Collins. In 2001, he received a Postgraduate Certificate in Teaching Higher Education at the University of Wales.

== Career and research ==
After his PhD studies, Thomas moved to northern Germany for 7.5 years to conduct postdoctoral research at various institutions such as the University of Bremen, the Alfred Wegener Institute in Bremerhaven, ICBM Oldenburg, and ZMT Bremen. There, he worked on experiments into cold tolerance of algae and oceanographic projects in the Antarctic, Arctic, and other sea areas.

Thomas returned to the UK in July 1996 to join the School of Ocean Sciences at Bangor University, where he became the Professor of Marine Biology (2006-2020), Head of School (2016-2019), and the Pro Vice-Chancellor for Research (2019-2020). During this time period, he was also a professor of Arctic Marine Biology at Aarhus University in 2013. From December 2013 to March 2019, Thomas was the director of the Welsh Sêr Cymru National Research Network for Low Carbon Energy and the Environment.

Thomas held leadership roles in two major UK research programmes for the Natural Environment Research Council (NERC). He chaired the Programme Advisory Group for the £15 million Arctic Research Programme (2010-2016). He subsequently chaired the Programme Advisory Group for the £20 million Changing Arctic Ocean Programme (2015-2021).

Concurrently, Thomas was an Academy of Finland FiDiPro (Finland Distinguished Professor Programme) from 2009 to 2013 at the Finnish Environment Institute (SYKE), where he continued as a visiting Research Professor between 2014 and 2019.

He moved to the University of Helsinki in 2020 to take up the Professorship in Arctic Ecosystems Research, where he has also been a Docent since 2010.

Thomas' research focuses on marine biology, aquatic ecology, and biogeochemistry, with a specific emphasis on Arctic, Antarctic, and Baltic sea ice environments. His academic work also examines the role of dissolved organic matter, inorganic nutrients, and bacteria in ice, aquatic systems, and land-ocean transitions, and on the physiological ecology of seaweed and halophytes. In applied science, his interests encompass inorganic nutrients, phytoplankton primary production, and industrial microalgal biomass production and utilization. Beyond core research, Thomas works in science and innovation strategies, public science communication, and interdisciplinary initiatives exploring the connections between science and art.

== Selected publications ==
Thomas has authored, co-authored, and edited over 270 scholarly works, including specialist research articles and works for non-specialist audiences:

- Sea Ice 4^{th} Edition: Its physics, chemistry, biology, geology and societal importance. Wiley. Hoboken. 2025
- Burden of calling out toxic academic practices. Nature, 2023
- Introducing Oceanography. Dunedin Academic Press Ltd. 2021
- Arctic ecology. Wiley-Blackwell, Oxford. 2021
- Marine Ecology - Processes, Systems and Impacts. Oxford University Press. 2020
- Sea Ice 3^{rd} Edition. Wiley-Blackwell. Chichester. 2017
- Art Forms from the Abyss: Ernst Haeckel's images from the HMS Challenger Expedition. Prestel, NY. 2015
- Sea Ice 2^{nd} Edition. Wiley-Blackwell. Oxford. 2010
- The biology of polar regions. Oxford: Oxford University Press. 2008.
- Frozen Oceans: The Floating World of Pack Ice. Natural History Museum. 2004
- Sea Ice: An Introduction to its Physics, Chemistry, Biology and Geology. Blackwell Science. 2003
- Phytoplankton productivity: carbon assimilation in marine and freshwater ecosystems. Oxford: Blackwell Science. 2003. ISBN 978-0-632-05711-5.
- Antarctic sea ice: A habitat for extremophiles. Science, 2002
- Seaweeds. Natural History Museum. 2002

== Awards and honours ==
- 1999: Awarded a British Science Association Media Fellowship - with placement at Times Higher Education
- 2001: One of the Royal Institution of Great Britain "Scientists for the New Century"
- 2001–2003 & 2024: Earth Fellowships at the Hanse-Wissenschaftskolleg, Delmenhorst, Germany
- 2004: Elected Fellow of the Royal Society of Biology (FRSB)
- 2018: Elected Fellow of the Learned Society of Wales (FLSW)
- 2020: The Thomas Glacier in Antarctica was named after him
- 2022: Awarded the UK Polar Medal.
- 2024: Awarded Honorary DSci by Bangor University for services to education
