= Snyder Peninsula =

Peninsula located in Antarctica

- Location within Antarctica

Geography
- Location: Palmer Land, Antarctica
- Coordinates: 71°25′S 61°26′W

Snyder Peninsula (71°25′S 61°26′W) is a high, ice-covered peninsula on the south side of Lamplugh Inlet terminating in Cape Howard, on the east coast of Palmer Land, Antarctica.

== Location ==
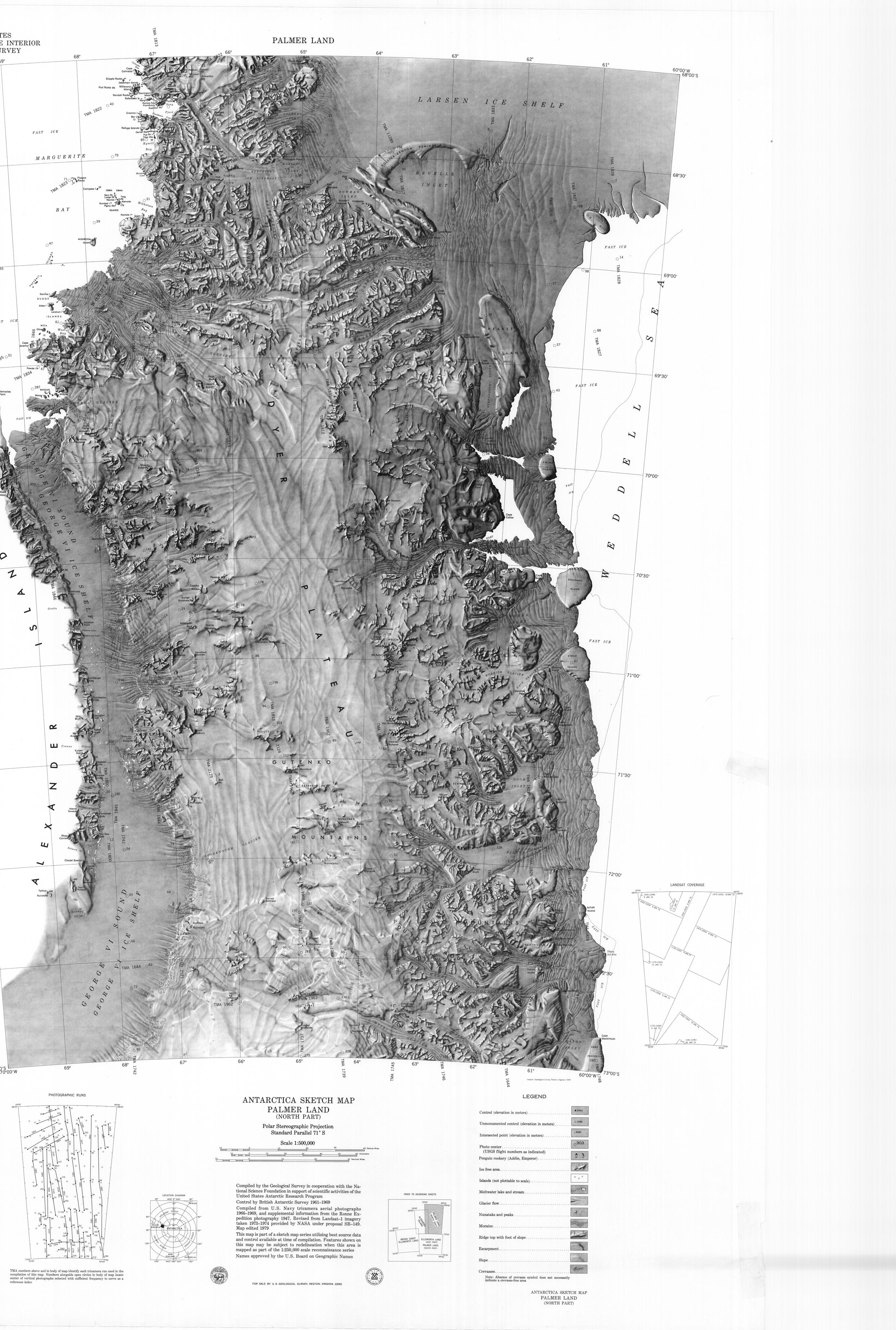
Northern Palmer Land. Condor Peninsula in southeast of map

The Snyder Peninsula is on the Black Coast of Palmer Land, beside the Weddell Sea to the east. It is north of Odom Inlet and southwest of Kvinge Peninsula and Palmer Inlet. The Muus Glacier flows past the west of the peninsula and Lamplugh Inlet is to the east. Cape Howard is at the west side of the mouth of Lamplugh Inlet, and Foster Peninsula and Cape Healy are at the east side. Features to the west of Snyder Peninsula include, from northeast to southwest, Strømme Ridge, O'Sullivan Peak, Mount Vennun and Rowley Massif.

== Mapping and name ==
Snyder Peninsula was mapped by the United States Geological Survey (USGS) in 1974. Named by United States Advisory Committee on Antarctic Names (US-ACAN) for Rear Admiral Joseph E. Snyder, Jr., United States Navy, Antarctic project Officer for the Assistant Secretary of the Navy for Research and Development, 1967–69.

== Eastern features ==
=== Lamplugh Inlet ===
71°23′S 61°10′W. Inlet 7 nautical miles (13 km; 8.1 mi) long, lying between Cape Healy and Cape Howard, along the east coast of Palmer Land. Discovered by members of the United States Antarctic Service (USAS) who explored this coast from East Base by land and from the air in 1940. Named for Elmer L. Lamplugh, chief radio operator at East Base.

=== Foster Peninsula ===
71°18′S 61°10′W. A high ice-covered peninsula between Palmer Inlet and Lamplugh Inlet on the east coast of Palmer Land. Mapped by USGS in 1974. Named by US-ACAN for Theodore D. Foster, USARP oceanographer on the International Weddell Sea Expedition, 1969. He was party leader on Weddell Sea investigations, 1972-73 and 1974-75.

=== Cape Healy ===
71°22′S 60°58′W. Prominent, square-shaped rock cape forming the north side of the entrance to Lamplugh Inlet, on the east coast of Palmer Land. Discovered by members of the USAS who explored this coast by land and from the air in 1940. Named for Joseph D. Healy, member of the ByrdAE, 1933-35, and dog driver at the USAS East Base, 1939–41.

== Western features ==
=== Strømme Ridge ===
71°27′S 61°42′W. A broad ice-covered ridge, 15 nautical miles (28 km; 17 mi) long, trending NW-SE between the Muus Glacier and Soto Glacier. The ridge terminates at the north side of Odom Inlet. Mapped by USGS in 1974. Named by US-ACAN for Jan A. Strømme, Norwegian oceanographer from the University of Bergen, a member of the International Weddell Sea Oceanographic Expeditions, 1968 and 1969.

=== O'Sullivan Peak ===
71°26′S 62°06′W. An ice-covered peak, 1,765 metres (5,791 ft) high, which forms the highest point and is near the south end of a north–south trending ice-covered ridge, standing 1.1 nautical miles (2.0 km; 1.3 mi) west of the north arm of Odom Inlet. The peak was photographed from the air by the USAS in December 1940, and was probably seen by the expedition's ground party that explored this coast. First charted by a joint party consisting of members of the RARE and the FIDS in 1947. Named by the FIDS for T.P. O'Sullivan, a member of the FIDS at the Hope Bay base in 1946-47.

=== Mount Vennun ===
71°33′S 61°53′W. A mountain surmounting the northeast part of Rowley Massif. Mapped by USGS in 1974. Named by US-ACAN for Walter R. Vennum, geologist, a member of the USGS geological and mapping party to the Lassiter Coast, 1972-73.

=== Rowley Massif ===
71°35′S 61°55′W. A prominent mountain massif between the Haley and Cline Glaciers. It surmounts the north side of the head of Odom Inlet. Mapped by USGS in 1974. Named by US-ACAN after geologist Peter D. Rowley of the USGS, a member of the USGS geologic and mapping party to the Lassiter Coast, 1970-71, and leader of the USGS party to the area, 1972-73.

== Sources ==
- Alberts, Fred G., ed. (1995), Geographic Names of the Antarctic (PDF) (2 ed.), United States Board on Geographic Names This article incorporates public domain material from websites or documents of the United States Board on Geographic Names.
- Palmer Land, USGS: United States Geological Survey

This article incorporates public domain material from websites or documents of the United States Geological Survey.
