= Wegener Range =

Mountain range in Palmer Land, Antarctica

- Location within Antarctica

Geography
- Region(s): Palmer Land, Antarctica
- Range coordinates: 72°42′S 62°23′W

Wegener Range (72°42′S 62°23′W) is a mountain range with peaks rising to 1,800 metres (5,900 ft), trending west-northwest – east-soitheast for about 45 nautical miles (83 km; 52 mi) between Maury Glacier and Fenton Glacier in southeast Palmer Land, Antarctica.

== Location ==
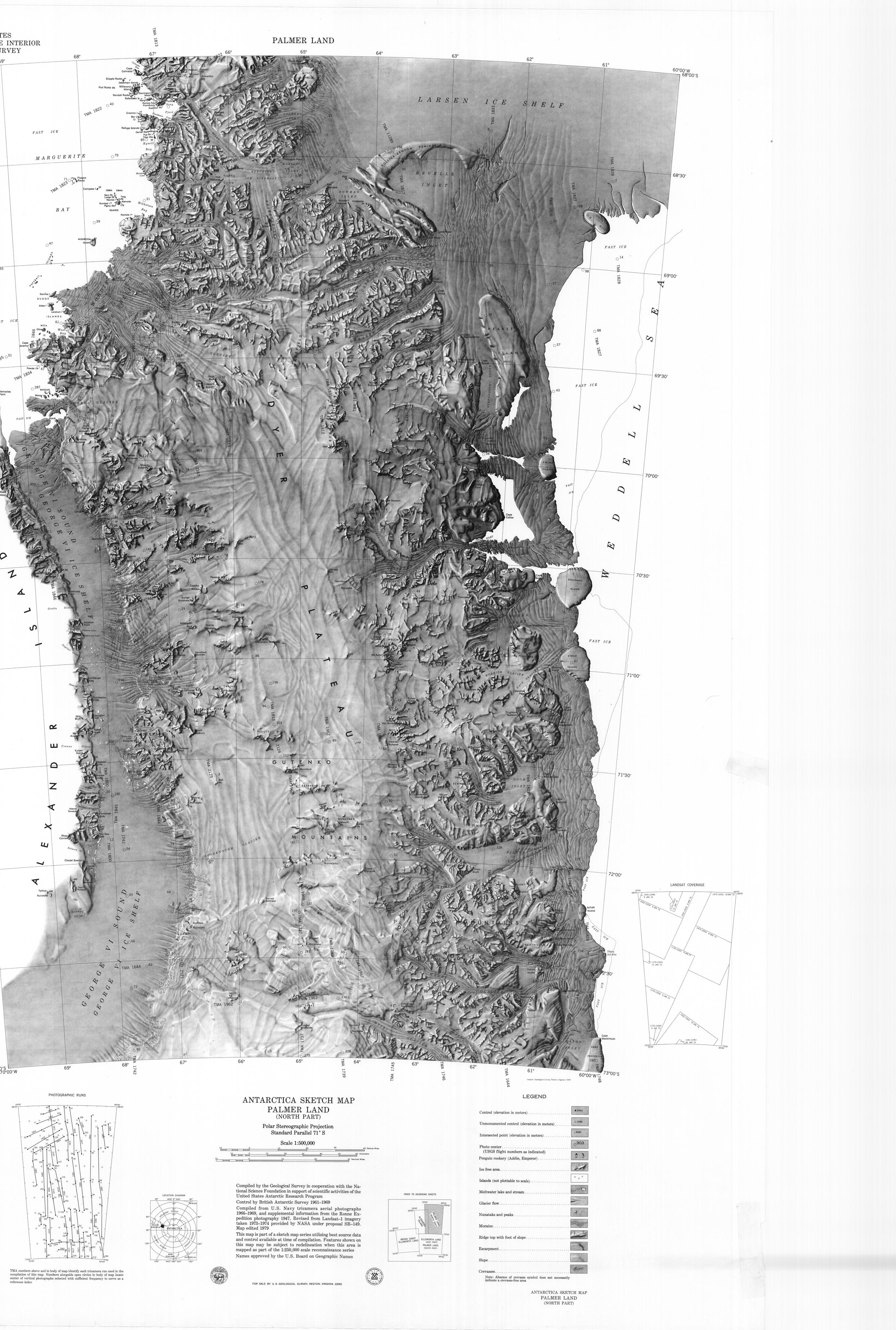
Palmer Land. Wegener Range in southeast of map

The Wegener Range is in eastern Palmer Land. It is south of the Du Toit Mountains and north of the Carey Range. It is west of the Violante Inlet and Mason Inlet. The Maury Glacier flows along its northern edge, and the Fenton Glacier along its southern edge. The Journal Peaks are to the east, and the Scott Uplands and Seward Mountains are further east, towards the George VI Sound.

== Discovery and name ==
The Wegener Range was first photographed from the air by the United States Antarctic Service (USAS), 1940; rephotographed by the United States Navy, 1966–69, and mapped from these photographs by the United States Geological Survey (USGS). In association with the names of continental drift scientists grouped in this area, named by United States Advisory Committee on Antarctic Names (US-ACAN) after Professor Alfred L. Wegener.

== Nearby features ==
=== Scott Uplands ===
72°42′S 66°05′W. A group of rounded hills rising to about 1,500 metres (4,900 ft) high south of Seward Mountains in southwest Palmer Land. Mapped by USGS from aerial photographs taken by the United States Navy, 1966-69. Surveyed by the British Antarctic Survey (BAS), 1974-75. Named by the UK Antarctic Place-Names Committee (UK-APC) in 1977 after Roger J. Scott, BAS surveyor, Stonington Island, 1973-75, who was in charge of the survey party in this area.

=== Seward Mountains ===
72°26′S 66°15′W. Isolated mountains, 1,525 metres (5,003 ft) high, standing 10 nautical miles (19 km; 12 mi) east-southeast of Buttress Nunataks and a like distance east of George VI Sound on the west coast of Palmer Land. Discovered in 1936 by the British Graham Land Expedition (BGLE) under John Rymill. Named by Rymill for Sir Albert Charles Seward, professor of botany at Cambridge, 1906-36.

== Sources ==
- Alberts, Fred G., ed. (1995), Geographic Names of the Antarctic (PDF) (2 ed.), United States Board on Geographic Names This article incorporates public domain material from websites or documents of the United States Board on Geographic Names.
- Palmer Land, USGS: United States Geological Survey

This article incorporates public domain material from websites or documents of the United States Geological Survey.
