= Violante Inlet =

Sea inlet in Antarctica

- Location within Antarctica
- Location: Black Coast, Antarctic Peninsula, Antarctica
- Coordinates: 72°35′S 61°5′W
- Type: Inlet
- Ocean/sea sources: Weddell Sea

Violante Inlet (72°35′S 61°5′W) is an ice-filled inlet 16 nautical miles (30 km; 18 mi) long, in an east–west direction, and 12 to 15 nautical miles (22 to 28 km; 14 to 17 mi) wide, lying between Cape Fanning and Cape Herdman along the east coast of Palmer Land, Antarctica.

== Location ==
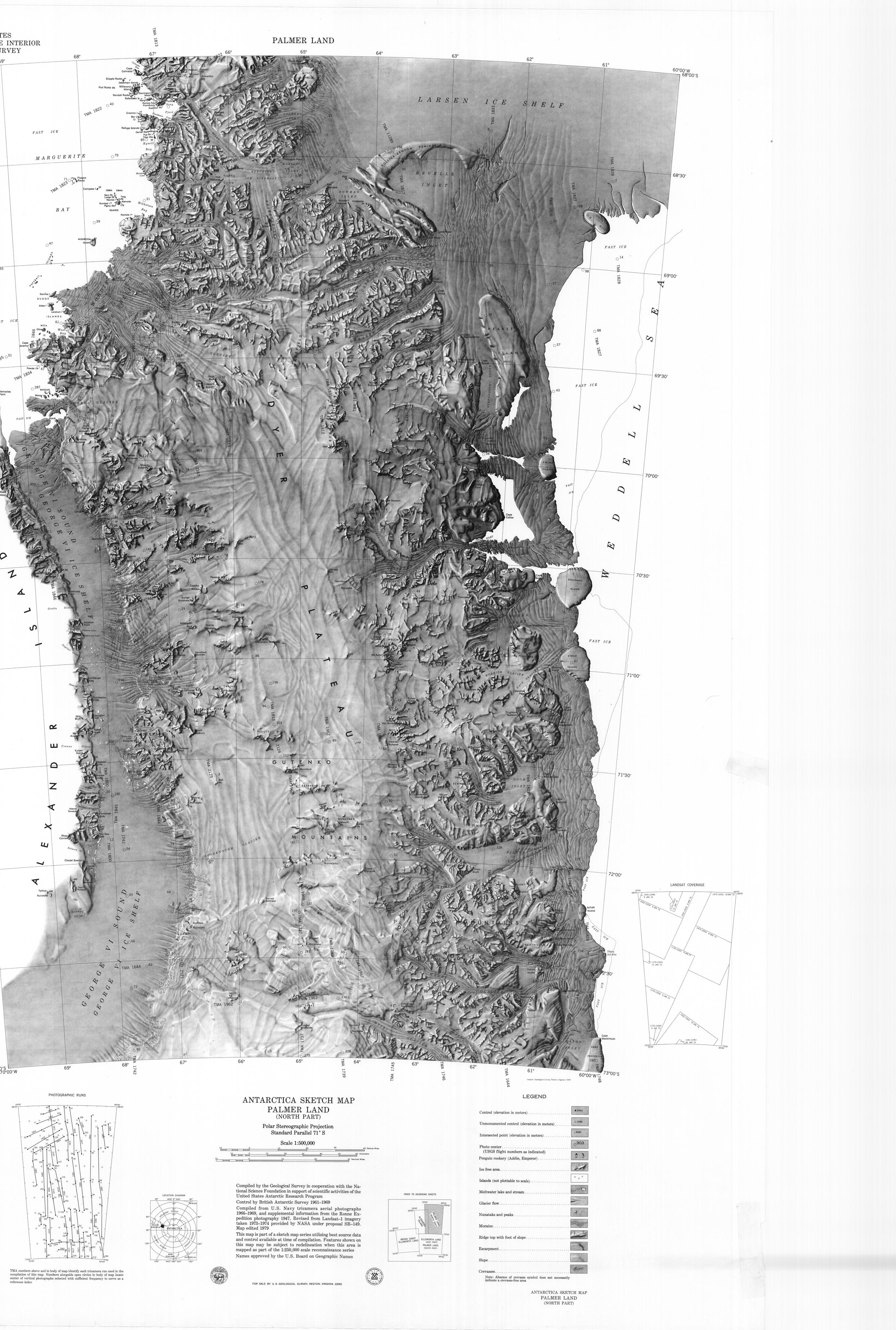
Northern Palmer Land. Violante Inlet in southeast of map

The Violante Inlet is on the Black Coast of Palmer Land, beside the Weddell Sea to the east. It is south of the Merz Peninsula, east of the Du Toit Mountains and the Wegener Range and north of the Mason Inlet and Kemp Peninsula. The mouth of the Violante Inlet extends from Cape Fanning in the north to Cape Herdman in the south. Pullen Island lies in the head of Violante Inlet, to the north of Maury Glacier, which joins Heezen Glacier to the east of Mount Reynolds and enters the inlet.

== Discovery and name ==
Violante Inlet was discovered and photographed from the air in December 1940 by members of the United States Antarctic Service (USAS) and named for Major (later Colonel) André L. Violante, USA, who designed the prefabricated buildings used by the expedition. Particularly because of a false floor, they proved to be the must satisfactory quarters used by American Antarctic expeditions.

== Northern features ==
=== Böhnecke Glacier ===
72°23′S 61°25′W. A steep glacier 3 nautical miles (5.6 km; 3.5 mi) wide, which flows southeast to the northwest side of Violante Inlet. Discovered and photographed from the air in December 1940 by members of the USAS. During 1947 the glacier was photographed from the air by members of the Ronne Antarctic Research Expedition (RARE) under Finn Ronne, who in conjunction with the Falkland Islands Dependencies Survey (FIDS) charted it from the ground. Named by the FIDS for Giinther Bohnecke, German oceanographer and member of the German expedition in the Meteor, 1925-27.

=== Defant Glacier ===
72°32′S 61°35′W. A glacier 2 nautical miles (3.7 km; 2.3 mi) wide at its mouth, which flows east-southeast to the west side of Violante Inlet. Discovered and photographed from the air in December 1940 by the USAS. During 1947 the glacier was photographed from the air by members of the RARE, who in conjunction with the FIDS charted it from the ground. Named by the FIDS for Professor Albert Defant, German oceanographer (Austrian born) who was director of the Inst. fur Meereskunde (German Hydrographic Office), 1927-46.

=== Cape Fanning ===
72°24′S 60°39′W. The cape which forms the north side of the entrance to Violante Inlet. Discovered by the USAS in a flight from East Base on December 30, 1940. Named by the US-ACAN for Edmund Fanning, of Stonington, CT, and New York City, who in addition to actual Antarctic exploration in connection with his sealing and whaling business also vigorously promoted exploration by others under both private and public auspices. His book, Voyages Round the World, published in 1833, is an authoritative work on early American Antarctic exploration.

=== Tharp Ice Rise ===
72°25′S 59°54′W. An ice rise, about 1.3 nautical miles (2.4 km; 1.5 mi) long, located at the ice front (1966) of Larsen Ice Shelf, 15 nautical miles (28 km; 17 mi) east of Cape Fanning. The ice rise was mapped by the United States Geological Survey (USGS) from United States Navy aerial photographs taken 1966-69. In association with the names of Antarctic oceanographers grouped in this area, named by the UK Antarctic Place-Names Committee (UK-APC) in 1977 after Marie Tharp, American marine geologist and oceanographer of Lamont-Doherty Geological Observatory, Columbia University, New York.

=== Pullen Island ===
72°35′S 60°57′W. A snow-covered island 5 nautical miles (9.3 km; 5.8 mi) long, which rises to 495 metres (1,624 ft) high at its north end, lying near the center of Violante Inlet. Discovered by the USAS in a flight from East Base on December 30, 1940, and named for William A. Pullen, Aviation Machinist's Mate at the East Base.

== Southern features ==
=== Heirtzler Ice Piedmont ===
72°34′S 61°25′W. A relatively low, triangular-shaped, ice-covered area of about 7 nautical miles (13 km; 8.1 mi) extent, located at the west side of Violante Inlet and north of Maury Glacier. The feature was first seen and photographed from the air by the US AS on December 30, 1940, and was mapped by USGS from United States Navy aerial photographs taken 1966-69. In association with the names of continental drift scientists grouped in this area, named by the United States Advisory Committee on Antarctic Names (US-ACAN) after James R. Heirtzler, American physicist; Research Scientist, LamontDoherty Geological Observatory, Columbia University, 1960-64 (Senior Research Scientist, 1964-67); Senior Scientist, Woods Hole Oceanographic Institute, 1969-86; Geophysicist and Head, Geophysics Branch, NASA Goddard Space Flight Center, from 1986.

=== Maury Glacier ===
72°42′S 61°40′W. A glacier 4 nautical miles (7.4 km; 4.6 mi) wide, flowing in an east-northeast direction to the southwest corner of Violante Inlet. Discovered and photographed from the air in December 1940 by members of the USAS. During 1947 the glacier was photographed from the air by the RARE, who in conjunction with the FIDS charted it from the ground. Named by the FIDS for Matthew F. Maury, 1806-73, American naval officer and hydrographer, and distinguished promoter of maritime research and Antarctic exploration.

=== Heezen Glacier ===
72°45′S 61°18′W. A glacier flowing northeast from the east portion of Wegener Range and entering Violante Inlet east of Mount Reynolds. Mapped by USGS from aerial photographs taken by the United States Navy, 1966-69. In association with the names of oceanographers grouped in this area, named by the UK-APC in 1977 after Bruce C. Heezen (1924-77), American marine geologist and oceanographer; Professor of Geology, Lamont-Doherty Geological Observatory, Columbia University, 1964-77.

=== Mount Reynolds ===
72°42′S 61°16′W. A snow-capped mountain, 1,130 metres (3,710 ft) high, marked by steep, rocky lower slopes, standing at the south side of Violante Inlet. Discovered by members of the USAS in a flight from East Base on December 30, 1940. Named by the US-SCAN for Jeremiah (John) N. Reynolds, longtime protagonist (1826-38) of American exploration and expansion in the Pacific and the Antarctic.

=== Cape Herdman ===
72°36′S 60°36′W. A broad ice-covered cape forming the south entrance point to Violante Inlet. The cape was photographed from the air in 1940 by USAS; rephotographed from the air in 1947 by RARE and, in conjunction with FIDS surveyed from the ground. Named by UK-APC after Henry P.P. Herdman (1901-67), British oceanographer and member of the scientific staff of DI, 1924-49; with the National Institute of Oceanography, 1949-67.

=== Fogg Highland ===
72°45′S 60°50′W. An ice-covered upland, 20 nautical miles (37 km; 23 mi) long and 10 nautical miles (19 km; 12 mi) wide, terminating on the northeast in Cape Herdman and bounded on the north by Violante Inlet and on the south by Clowes Glacier. The feature was photographed from the air by the USAS in 1940, the RARE in 1947, and the United States Navy, 1965-67; surveyed by the joint RARE-FIDS sledge party in November 1947. Named in 1981 by the UK-APC after Gordon E. Fogg, Professor of Marine Biology, University College of North Wales, 1971-85, who conducted research in the Antarctic Peninsula area in conjunction with BAS in 1966, 1974, and 1979; Chairman, BAS Scientific Advisory Committee, 1970-86.

== Sources ==
- Alberts, Fred G., ed. (1995), Geographic Names of the Antarctic (PDF) (2 ed.), United States Board on Geographic Names This article incorporates public domain material from websites or documents of the United States Board on Geographic Names.
- Palmer Land, USGS: United States Geological Survey

This article incorporates public domain material from websites or documents of the United States Geological Survey.
