= Hilton Inlet =

Body of water in Palmer Land, Antarctica

- Location within Antarctica
- Location: Black Coast, Antarctic Peninsula, Antarctica
- Coordinates: 71°57′S 61°20′W
- Type: Inlet
- Ocean/sea sources: Weddell Sea

Hilton Inlet (71°57′S 61°20′W) is an ice-filled inlet, 12 nautical miles (22 km; 14 mi) wide, which recedes about 22 nautical miles (41 km; 25 mi) west from its entrance between Cape Darlington and Cape Knowles, along the east coast of Palmer Land, Antarctica.

== Location ==
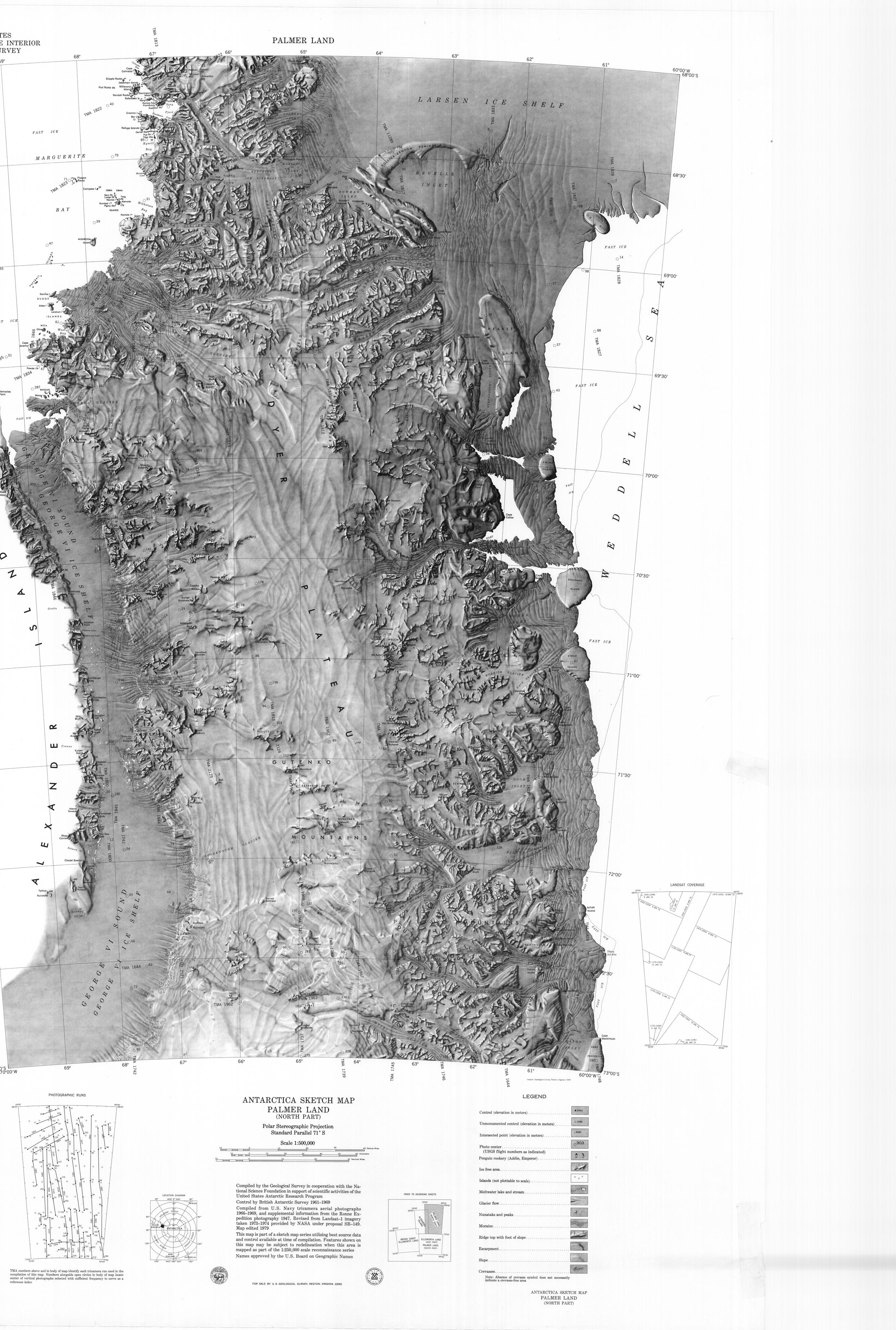
Northern Palmer Land. Hilton Inlet in southeast of map

Hilton Inlet is on the east coast of Palmer Land, north of Violante Inlet and Schott Inlet, and south of Odom Inlet. The Merz Peninsula and Wilson Mountains are to the south, the Hess Mountains are to the west, and the Condor Peninsula is to the north. Glaciers feeding the inlet include, clockwise from the south, Spiess Glacier, Beaumont Glacier and its left tributary Runcorn Glacier, Gruening Glacier and its left tributary Kellogg Glacier. Other features, clockwise from the south, include Cape Darlington, Dietz Bluff, Boyer Spur, Malva Bluff and Cape Knowles.

== Discovery and name ==
Hilton Inlet was discovered by the United States Antarctic Service (USAS) in 1940, and named for Donald C. Hilton, a member of the East Base sledge party that charted this coast as far south as this inlet.

== Glaciers ==
=== Spiess Glacier ===
72°12′S 61°18′W. A glacier about 8 nautical miles (15 km; 9.2 mi) long on Merz Peninsula, flowing north into a small bay east of Hjort Massif on the south side of Hilton Inlet. Mapped by the United States Geological Survey (USGS) from aerial photographs taken by the United States Navy, 1966-69. Surveyed by the British Antarctic Survey (BAS), 1974-75. In association with the names of Antarctic oceanographers grouped in this area, named by the UK Antarctic Place-Names Committee (UK-APC) in 1977 after Captain (later Vice Admiral) Fritz A. Spiess (1881-1959), of the German Navy, Commander and Scientific Chief of the German Atlantic Expedition in Meteor, 1925-27, after the death of Professor Alfred Merz.

=== Beaumont Glacier ===
72°02′S 62°00′W. A broad glacier flowing in a northeast direction to the southwest part of Hilton Inlet. The USAS discovered and photographed it from the air in 1940. It was resighted in 1947 by the Ronne Antarctic Research Expedition (RARE) under Finn Ronne, who named it for the city of Beaumont, Texas, in recognition of the public support given his expedition by this city and the Tejas Chapter of the Daughters of the Republic of Texas, at Beaumont.

=== Runcorn Glacier ===
72°03′S 62°42′W. A glacier to the west of Hess Mountains, flowing southeast to join Beaumont Glacier near the head of Hilton Inlet. Mapped by USGS from aerial photographs taken by the United States Navy, 1966-69. Surveyed by BAS, 1972-73. In association with the names of continental drift scientists grouped in this area, named by the United States Advisory Committee on Antarctic Names (US-ACAN) in 1978 after Stanley K. Runcorn, English geophysicist, Professor of Physics, University of Newcastle, from 1963.

=== Gruening Glacier ===
71°52′S 61°55′W. Broad glacier descending southeast between steep rock walls to the northwest part of Hilton Inlet. Discovered by the USAS in a flight down this glacier from East Base on 30 December 1940. Named for Ernest H. Gruening, Director of the Division of Territories and Island Possessions, United States Dept. of the Interior, during the inception of the USAS, and member of the Executive Committee by which the USAS was directed, later United States Senator from Alaska.

=== Kellogg Glacier ===
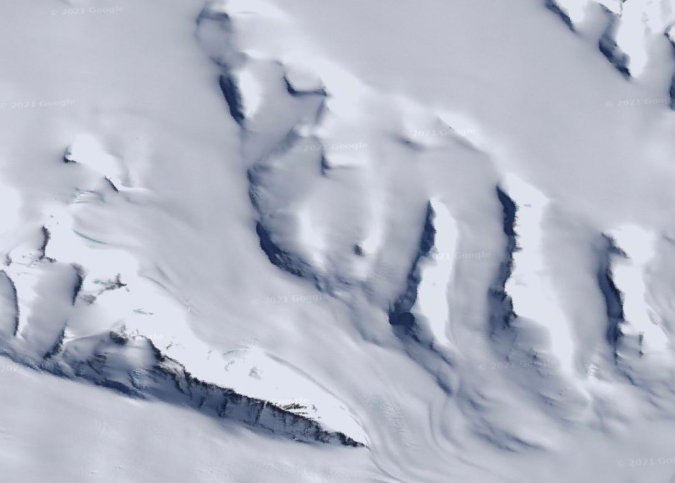
Kellogg Glacier in Google Earth. Boyer Spur in lower left of image.

71°51′S 62°41′W. A glacier about 9 nautical miles (17 km; 10 mi) long at the base of Condor Peninsula. The glacier flows southeast along the north side of Boyer Spur and merges with the north side of Gruening Glacier just inland from the northwest head of Hilton Inlet. Mapped by USGS in 1974. Named by US-ACAN for geologist Karl S. Kellogg, a member of the USGS Lassiter Coast party in 1972-73.

== Other features ==
=== Cape Darlington ===
72°00′S 60°43′W. Ice-covered headland which rises to 305 metres (1,001 ft) high, forming the south side of the entrance to Hilton Inlet. Discovered in 1940 by the USAS, but at that time it was thought to be an island. Its true nature was determined in an aerial flight by the RARE under Ronne, in November 1947. Named by the USAS for Harry Darlington III, member of the East Base sledging party that explored this coast as far south as Hilton Inlet. Darlington was also a member of the RARE.

=== Dietz Bluff ===
72°02′S 62°08′W. A prominent bluff at the head of Hilton Inlet. The bluff was photographed from the air by USAS, 1940, and by RARE, 1947. It was mapped by USGS from United States Navy aerial photographs taken 1966-69. Named by US-ACAN, in association with the names of continental drift scientists grouped in this area, after Robert S. Dietz, American marine geologist with Atlantic Oceanographic and Meteorological Laboratory, Miami, Florida, from 1967.

=== Boyer Spur ===
71°51′S 62°48′W. A mountainous spur from the base of Condor Peninsula. The spur stands between the Kellogg Glacier and Gruening Glacier, about 5 nautical miles (9.3 km; 5.8 mi) west-northwest of Malva Bluff and the northwest head of Hilton Inlet. Mapped by the USGS in 1974. Named by US-ACAN for Stephen J. Boyer, geologist with the USGS geological and mapping party to the Lassiter Coast area in 1972-73.

=== Malva Bluff ===
71°55′S 62°21′W. A steep, south-facing rock bluff at the base of the Condor Peninsula, overlooking the northwest extremity of Hilton Inlet. Mapped by USGS in 1974. Named by US-ACAN after Antonio I. Malva-Gomes, topographic engineer with the USGS Lassiter Coast geologic and mapping party in 1970-71. He was also a member of the Pine Island Bay Reconnaissance aboard the USCGC Burton Island, 1974-75.

=== Cape Knowles ===
71°48′S 60°50′W. Cape rising to 305 metres (1,001 ft) high, marking the north side of the entrance to Hilton Inlet. Discovered by members of East Base of the USAS in 1940. Named for Paul H. Knowles, geologist and leader of the East Base sledging party that surveyed this coast as far south as Hilton Inlet.

== Sources ==
- Alberts, Fred G., ed. (1995), Geographic Names of the Antarctic (PDF) (2 ed.), United States Board on Geographic Names This article incorporates public domain material from websites or documents of the United States Board on Geographic Names.
- Palmer Land, USGS: United States Geological Survey

This article incorporates public domain material from websites or documents of the United States Geological Survey.
