= Gurney Point =

Gurney Point (71°0′S 67°27′W) is a small rocky mass overlooking George VI Sound, rising to 610 metres (2,000 ft) and marking the western extremity of the rock ridge separating Bertram Glacier and Ryder Glacier on the west coast of Palmer Land, Antarctica. The point was first seen and photographed from the air on November 23, 1935, by Lincoln Ellsworth, and was mapped from these photographs by W.L.G. Joerg. It was surveyed in 1936 by the British Graham Land Expedition (BGLE) under John Rymill, and was named by the UK Antarctic Place-Names Committee in 1954 for Norman A. Gurney, a member of the BGLE, 1934–37.
