= Ryder Glacier =

Glacier in Antarctica

- Location within Antarctica
- Location: Dyer Plateau, Palmer Land
- Coordinates: 71°7′S 67°20′W
- Thickness: unknown
- Terminus: George VI Sound
- Status: unknown

Ryder Glacier is a gently sloping glacier, 13 nautical miles (24 km) long and wide, flowing west from the Dyer Plateau of Palmer Land into George VI Sound to the south of Gurney Point. First surveyed in 1936 by the British Graham Land Expedition (BGLE) under Rymill. Named by the United Kingdom Antarctic Place-Names Committee (UK-APC) in 1954 for Captain Robert Ryder, Royal Navy, who as Lieutenant, was commander of the Penola during the BGLE, 1934–37.
