= Black Coast =

Location of Black Coast

Black Coast is the portion of the east coast of the Antarctic Peninsula between Cape Boggs and Cape Mackintosh. This coast was discovered and photographed from the air by members of the East Base of the U.S. Antarctic Service, 1939–41, on a flight of December 30, 1940. The most southerly point reached was Wright Inlet at 74°S, but features as far south as Bowman Peninsula are identifiable in the aerial photographs taken on the flight.

Black Coast was named after Commander (later Admiral) Richard B. Black, U.S. Navy Reserve (1902–92), leader of the December 30 flight and commanding officer of the East Base.

== See also ==
- Heirtzler Ice Piedmont
