= Palmer Land =

Geographic region in Antarctica

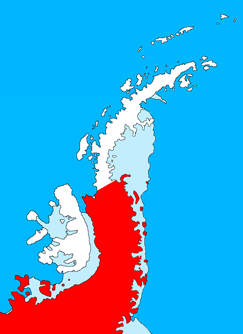
Palmer Land.

Palmer Land (71°30′S 065°00′W) is the portion of the Antarctic Peninsula, Antarctica that lies south of a line joining Cape Jeremy and Cape Agassiz. This application of Palmer Land is consistent with the 1964 agreement between the Advisory Committee on Antarctic Names and the UK Antarctic Place-Names Committee, in which the name Antarctic Peninsula was approved for the major peninsula of Antarctica, and the names Graham Land and Palmer Land for the northern and southern portions, respectively. The line dividing them is roughly 69° S.

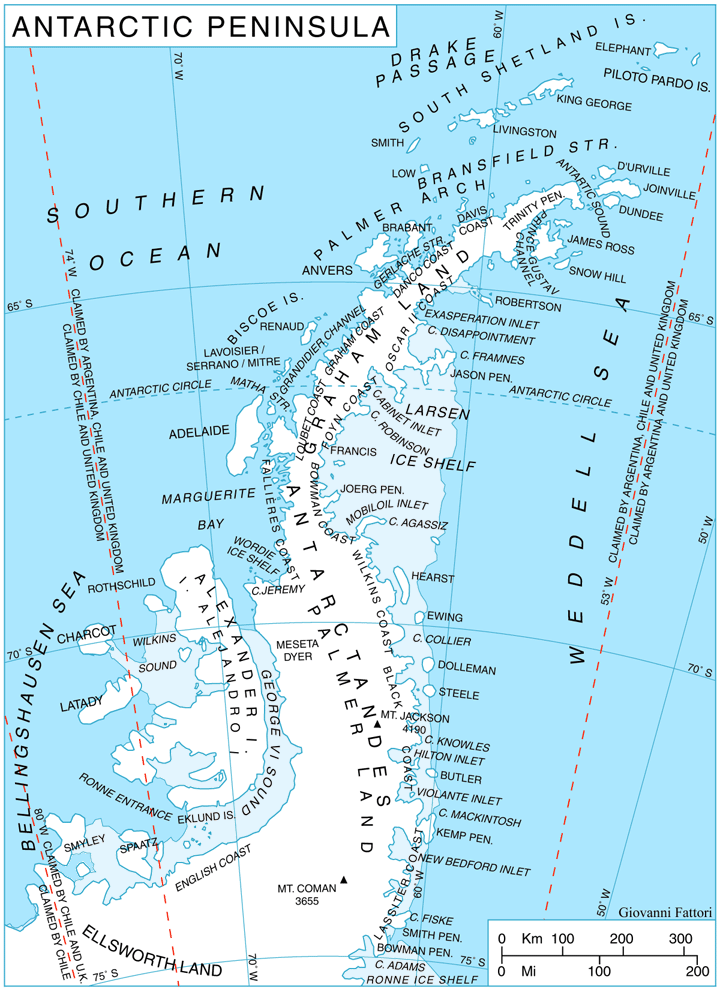
Antarctic Peninsula with Palmer Land visible below and south of Graham Land.

== Boundaries ==
In its southern extreme, the Antarctic Peninsula stretches west, with Palmer Land eventually bordering Ellsworth Land along the 80° W line of longitude. Palmer Land is bounded in the south by the ice-covered Carlson Inlet, an arm of the Filchner-Ronne Ice Shelf, which crosses the 80° W line. This is the base of Cetus Hill.

This feature is named after Nathaniel Palmer, an American sealer who explored the Antarctic Peninsula area southward of Deception Island in the sloop Hero in November 1820.

== Features ==
=== Mountain ranges and isolated peaks ===
- Briesemeister Peak
- Carey Range
- Columbia Mountains
- Dana Mountains
- Du Toit Mountains
- Engel Peaks (69°32′S 63°8′W)
- Mount Peterson
- Mount Pitman
- Mount Poster
- Mount Southern
- Mount Strong
- Mount Sullivan
- Pegasus Mountains
- Mandolin Hills
- O'Sullivan Peak
- Renner Peak
- Waitt Peaks

=== Nunatuks ===
- Aldebaran Rock (70°50′S 66°41′W), a particularly conspicuous nunatak of bright red rock, located near the head of Bertram Glacier and 5 miles (8 km) northeast of Pegasus Mountains in western Palmer Land. It was named by the UK Antarctic Place-Names Committee after Aldebaran, an orange-colored star that is the brightest in the constellation of Taurus.

=== Other ===
- Cape Rymill
- Rhino Rock
- Scott Uplands

== See also ==
- Flagon Point
- Foster Peninsula
- Giannini Peak
- Graham Spur
- Hall Ridge
- Heirtzler Ice Piedmont
- Hogmanay Pass
