= Columbia Mountains (Antarctica) =

Mountain range in Antarctica

- Location within Antarctica

Geography
- Region(s): Palmer Land, Antarctica
- Range coordinates: 70°14′S 63°51′W

The Columbia Mountains (70°14′S 63°51′W) are a group of largely bare rock peaks, ridges and nunataks located near the east margin of the Dyer Plateau, 20 nautical miles (37 km; 23 mi) south-east of the Eternity Range, in Palmer Land, Antarctica.

== Location ==
The Columbia Mountains are in central Palmer Land, between the George VI Sound to the east and Marguerite Bay to the west. They are south of the Eternity Range, east of the Dyer Plateau, northwest of the Eland Mountains and west of Smith Inlet and Hughes Ice Piedmont. Features, from north to south, include Mount Brocoum, Dalziel Ridge, Bardsdell Nunatak, Pinther Ridge and Mikus Hill. The Anckorn Nunataks are to the east.

== Mapping and name ==
The Columbia Mountains were mapped by the British Antarctic Survey (BAS) (Anckorn, J.F.. 1984 The geology of parts of the Wilkins and Black Coasts, Palmer Land. Cambridge, British Antarctic Survey, 30pp. (British Antarctic Survey Scientific Reports, 104).) in 1974. They were named by the United States Advisory Committee on Antarctic Names (US.ACAN) after Columbia University, New York City, which for several seasons in the 1960s and 1970s sent geologists to study the structure of the Scotia Ridge.

== Features ==
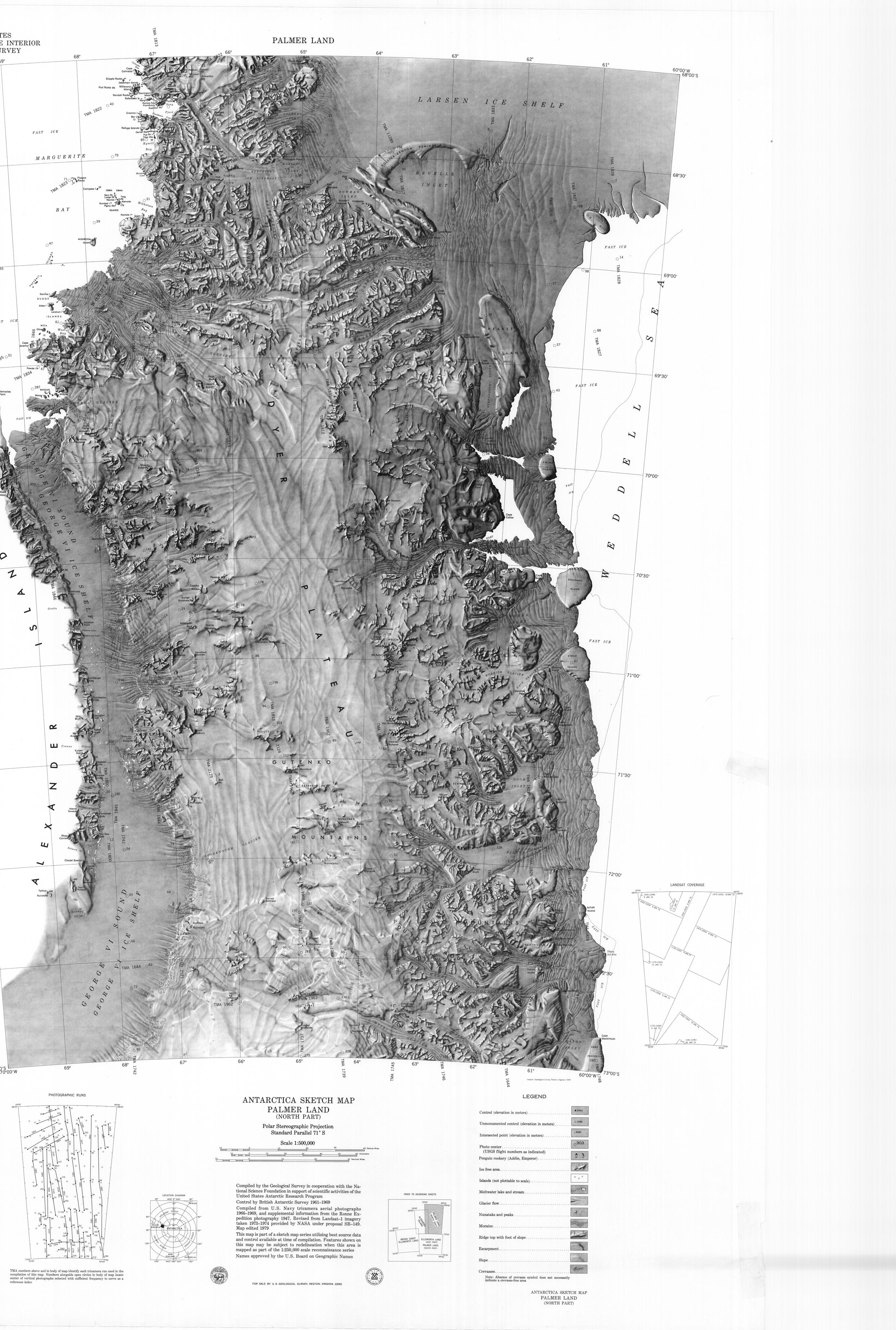
Northern Palmer Land. Columbia Mountains upper center of map

=== Mount Brocoum ===
70°12′S 63°45′W. The dominant peak on the eastern ridge of the Columbia Mountains. Mapped by the USGS in 1974. Named by US-ACAN for Stephan J. Brocoum and his wife, Alice V. Brocoum, Columbia University geologists who studied the structure of the Scotia Ridge area. He worked in 1968-69 and 1970-71; she, only the latter season.

=== Dalziel Ridge ===
70°15′S 63°55′W. The primary, western ridge of the Columbia Mountains. There is considerable exposure of bare rock along the west slopes of the feature. Mapped by the USGS in 1974. Named by US-ACAN for lan W.D. Dalziel, British geologist now at Columbia University, in several recent seasons (late 1960's to 1976) the principal USARP investigator of the structure and petrology of the Scotia Ridge area.

=== Bardsdell Nunatak ===
70°16′S 63°54′W. A mainly ice-free nunatak just north of Dalziel Ridge in the Columbia Mountains. Mapped by the USGS in 1974. Named by US-ACAN for Mark Bardsdell, Columbia University geologist who studied the structure of the Scotia Ridge area, 1970-71.

== Nearby features ==
=== Pinther Ridge ===
70°22′S 64°20′W. An arc-shaped mountain ridge, 6 nautical miles (11 km; 6.9 mi) long, that is somewhat isolated and mostly snow covered. It rises above the ice surface at the east margin of the Dyer Plateau, about 22 nautical miles (41 km; 25 mi) south of the Eternity Range. Mapped by USGS in 1974. Named by US-ACAN for Miklos Pinther, Chief Cartographer of the American Geographical Society in the 1970's, under whose supervision a number of excellent maps of Antarctica have been prepared.

=== Mikus Hill ===
70°27′S 63°50′W. A hill with a number of bare rock exposures, surmounting the southwest wall of Richardson Glacier. Mapped by USGS in 1974. Named by US-ACAN for Edward J. Mikus, PH3, United States Navy, photographer of the cartographic aerial mapping crew in LC-130 aircraft of Squadron VXE-6, 1968-69.

=== Anckorn Nunataks ===
70°14′S 63°12′W. A group of nunataks and snow-covered hills, 15 nautical miles (28 km; 17 mi) long, between Mount Bailey and Mount Samsel in the east part of Palmer Land. Named by the UK Antarctic Place-Names Committee (UK-APC) after J.F. Anckorn, BAS geologist who worked in the vicinity of this feature.

=== Mount Samsel ===
70°24′S 63°15′W. A mountain along the north side of Clifford Glacier, just west of the juncture of the Kubitza Glacier. Mapped by USGS in 1974. Named by US-ACAN for Gene L. Samsel, United States Antarctic Research Program (USARP) biologist at Palmer Station in the 1969-70 and 1970-71 seasons.

== Sources ==
- Alberts, Fred G., ed. (1995), Geographic Names of the Antarctic (PDF) (2 ed.), United States Board on Geographic Names This article incorporates public domain material from websites or documents of the United States Board on Geographic Names.
- Palmer Land, USGS: United States Geological Survey

This article incorporates public domain material from websites or documents of the United States Geological Survey.
