= Benson Hills =

Coastal hills near the head of Smith Inlet in Antarctica

The Benson Hills (70°28′S 62°17′W) are a cluster of coastal hills near the head of Smith Inlet in Antarctica, 3 nautical miles (6 km) east of Berry Massif on the east side of Palmer Land. They were mapped by the United States Geological Survey in 1974, and named by the Advisory Committee on Antarctic Names for Lieutenant Arthur K. Benson, a U.S. Navy Medical Officer at Palmer Station in 1969.
