= Gutenko Mountains =

Group of mountains in Palmer Land, Antarctica

- Location within Antarctica

Geography
- Region(s): Palmer Land, Antarctica
- Range coordinates: 71°40′S 64°45′W

The Gutenko Mountains (71°40′S 64°45′W) are a large, scattered group of hills, nunataks and small mountains at the south end of Dyer Plateau in central Palmer Land, Antarctica. The feature includes the Elliott Hills, the Rathbone Hills, the Guthridge Nunataks and the Blanchard Nunataks.

== Location ==
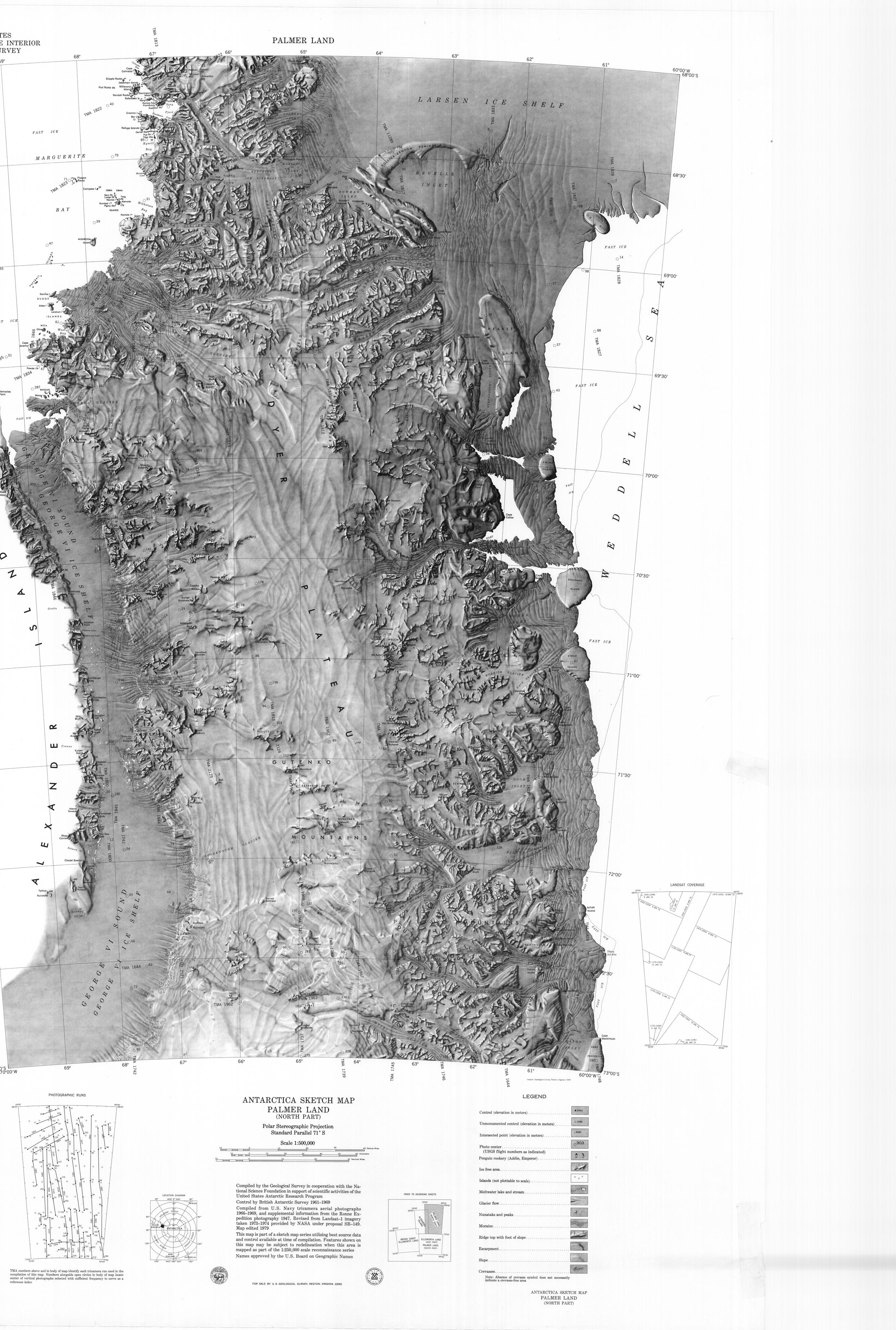
Palmer Land. Gutenko Mountains in south center of map

The Gutenko Mountains are in central Palmer Land at the south end of the Dyer Plateau, to the east of Goodenough Glacier. The Batterbee Mountains and George VI Sound are to the west. The Holmes Hills and Hess Mountains are to the southeast, Mount Jackson is to the east and the Welch Mountains are to the northeast. Features, from north to south, include the Elliott Hills, Mount Mumford, the Rathbone Hills, Randall Ridge, the Guthridge Nunataks, Mount Jukkola, Walcott Peak, Lokey Peak, the Blanchard Nunataks.

== Discovery and name ==
The Gutenko Mountains were seen from the air during flights of November 21 and December 23, 1947, by the Ronne Antarctic Research Expedition (RARE). They are named for Sigmund Gutenko, United States Navy, chief commissary steward with the expedition. The mountains were mapped in detail by the United States Geological Survey (USGS) in 1974.

== Features ==
=== Elliott Hills ===
71°25′S 65°25′W. A group of low hills and nunataks, 12 nautical miles (22 km; 14 mi) long, that mark the northwest end of the Gutenko Mountains. Mapped by the USGS in 1974. Named by the United States Advisory Committee on Antarctic Names (US-ACAN) for Lieutenant Commander David J. Elliott, United States Navy, Commander of LC-130 aircraft in aerial photographic and ice-sensing flights over extensive areas of the Antarctic continent during Operation Deep Freeze, 1970 and 1971.

=== Mount Mumford ===
71°33′S 65°09′W. The central summit in the line of low rock peaks 4 nautical miles (7.4 km; 4.6 mi) north of the west end of Rathbone Hills. Mapped by the USGS in 1974. Named by the US-ACAN for Lieutenant Joel H. Mumford, United States Navy, Medical Officer at Palmer Station, 1972.

=== Rathbone Hills ===
71°39′S 64°48′W. A line of low hills or nunataks, 14 nautical miles (26 km; 16 mi) long and trending east–west, located 4 nautical miles (7.4 km; 4.6 mi) north of Guthridge Nunataks. Mapped by the USGS in 1974. Named by the US-ACAN for Major David L. Rathbone, USMC, Commander of LC-130 aircraft in United States Navy Squadron VXE-6 during Operation Deep Freeze, 1970 and 1971.

=== Randall Ridge ===
71°44′S 64°38′W. An arc-shaped rock ridge at the north side of the Guthridge Nunataks. Mapped by the USGS in 1974. Named by the US-ACAN after Robert H. Randall (1890–1966), Assistant on Cartography with the United States Bureau of the Budget in the Executive Office of the President, with responsibility for coordinating the mapping activities of the Government, 1941–60. In 1954 he set up the Technical Advisory Committee on Antarctic Mapping that established a mapping program for Antarctica based on the best technical methods.

=== Guthridge Nunataks ===
71°48′S 64°33′W. A scattered group of sharp peaked nunataks and small mountains, about 22 nautical miles (41 km; 25 mi) long and 6 nautical miles (11 km; 6.9 mi) wide, midway between Rathbone Hills and Blanchard Nunataks. Mapped by the USGS in 1974. Named by the US-ACAN after Guy G. Guthridge, Director, Polar Information Service, Division of Polar Programs, National Science Foundation; Editor, Antarctic Journal of the United States; member, of US-ACAN, from 1989 (chairman from 1994).

=== Mount Jukkola ===
71°51′S 64°38′W. A sharp, pyramidal peak, or nunatak, at the south-central margin of the Guthridge Nunataks. Mapped by the USGS in 1974. Named by the US-ACAN for Lieutenant Lloyd A. Jukkola, CEC, United States Navy, Officer-in-Charge of Palmer Station in 1973.

=== Walcott Peak ===
71°49′S 64°22′W. A large nunatak midway between Mount Jukkola and Lokey Peak in the south part of the Guthridge Nunataks. Mapped by the USGS in 1974. Named by the US-ACAN for Lieutenant Fred P. Walcott, CEC, United States Navy, Officer-in-Charge of the South Pole Station in 1973.

=== Lokey Peak ===
71°50′S 64°06′W. A small, sharp peak, or nunatak, standing at the southeast extremity of the Guthridge Nunataks. Mapped by USGS in 1974. Named by US-ACAN for William M. Lokey, Station Manager at Palmer Station, 1975. He previously wintered at McMurdo Station in 1970 and 1974.

=== Blanchard Nunataks ===
72°00′S 64°50′W. An east-west trending group of nunataks, about 16 nautical miles (30 km; 18 mi) long, marking the south end of the Gutenko Mountains. Mapped by USGS in 1974. Named by US-ACAN for Lloyd G. Blanchard, of the Division of Polar Programs, National Science Foundation, Assistant Editor, Antarctic Journal of the United States.

== Sources ==
- Alberts, Fred G., ed. (1995), Geographic Names of the Antarctic (PDF) (2 ed.), United States Board on Geographic Names This article incorporates public domain material from websites or documents of the United States Board on Geographic Names.
- Palmer Land, USGS: United States Geological Survey

This article incorporates public domain material from websites or documents of the United States Geological Survey.
