= Eielson Peninsula =

Peninsula located in Antarctica

- Location within Antarctica

Geography
- Location: Palmer Land, Antarctica
- Coordinates: 70°35′S 61°45′W

Eielson Peninsula (70°35′S 61°45′W) is a rugged, mainly snow-covered peninsula, 20 nautical miles (37 km; 23 mi) long in an east–west direction and averaging 10 nautical miles (19 km; 12 mi) wide, lying between Smith Inlet and Lehrke Inlet on the east coast of Palmer Land, Antarctica.

== Location ==
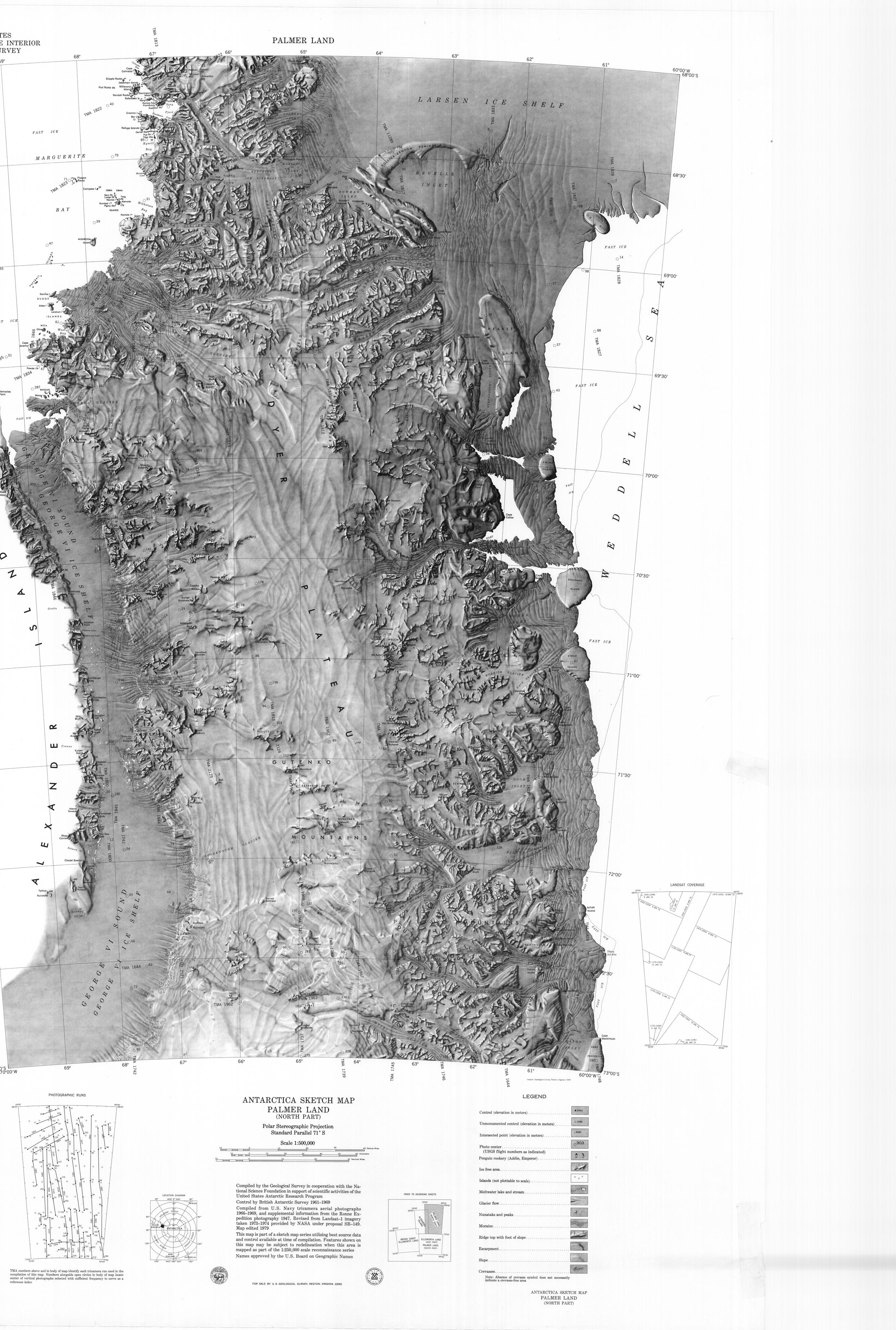
Northern Palmer Land. Kvinge Peninsula in southeast of map

The Kvinge Peninsula is on the Wilkins Coast of Palmer Land, beside the Weddell Sea to the east. It lies between Yates Glacier and Lehrke Inlet to the south and Smith Inlet to the north. Dolleman Island is to the east. The Welch Mountains are west-southwest, the Eland Mountains are west and the Columbia Mountains are northwest. Features include Cape Boggs at the eastern end, Elder Bluff, Houston Glacier, Gurling Glacier, Leininger Peak, Mount Thompson, Ashton Glacier and Dawson Head.

== Discovery and name ==
The rocky north wall of the Eielson Peninsula is probably the feature which, on his flight of December 20, 1928, Sir Hubert Wilkins sighted and named "Cape Eielson" from a position above Stefansson Strait (Wilkins gave the name to the farthest south rock outcrop seen from this position). This rock wall is conspicuous in the aerial photographs of the peninsula taken by members of the United States Antarctic Service (USAS) in 1940 from an aerial position at the north side of Stefansson Strait. The peninsula is named for Carl B. Eielson, the pilot on Wilkins' flight of 1928.

== Features ==
=== Elder Bluff ===
70°31′S 61°44′W. A prominent and mostly bare rock bluff that forms a portion of the north side of Eielson Peninsula and overlooks Smith Inlet. Named by the United States Advisory Committee on Antarctic Names (US-ACAN) for Robert B. Elder, Chief of the United States Coast Guard Oceanographic Unit on the first International Weddell Sea Oceanographic Expedition on board USCGC Glacier in 1968.

=== Houston Glacier ===
70°34′S 62°03′W. A small glacier that drains north from Eielson Peninsula into Smith Inlet. Mapped by the United States Geological Survey (USGS) in 1974. Named by the US-ACAN for Robert B. Houston, RM1, United States Navy, radioman at Palmer Station in 1973.

=== Krebs Ridge ===
70°33′S 62°25′W. An east–west ridge which forms the north wall of Gurling Glacier and terminates at the southwest head of Smith Inlet. Mapped by USGS in 1974. Named by US-ACAN for William N. Krebs, United States Antarctic Research Program (USARP) biologist at Palmer Station in 1972.

=== Gurling Glacier ===
70°34′S 62°20′W. A glacier draining between Krebs Ridge and Leininger Peak into the southwest corner of Smith Inlet. Named by UK Antarctic Place-Names Committee (UK-APC) after P. Curling, British Antarctic Survey (BAS) surveyor who worked in the general vicinity of this feature.

=== Leininger Peak ===
70°34′S 62°15′W. A peak, 1,135 metres (3,724 ft) high, standing at the north side of the base of Eielson Peninsula. The peak was photographed from the air by the Ronne Antarctic Research Expedition (RARE) under Finn Ronne, 1947-48, and charted in 1947 by a joint sledge party consisting of members of the RARE and FIDS. Named by Ronne for Commander Joseph A. Leininger, United States Navy Reserve, who devised the plans for the loading of cargo and the alterations on the expedition ship.

=== Mount Thompson ===
70°40′S 62°21′W. A mountain, 1,690 metres (5,540 ft) high, standing northwest of Lehrke Inlet and surmounting the central part of the base of Eielson Peninsula. Discovered by the RARE, 1947-48, under Ronne, who named this feature for Andrew A. Thompson, geophysicist with the expedition.

== Sources ==
- Alberts, Fred G., ed. (1995), Geographic Names of the Antarctic (PDF) (2 ed.), United States Board on Geographic Names This article incorporates public domain material from websites or documents of the United States Board on Geographic Names.
- Palmer Land, USGS: United States Geological Survey

This article incorporates public domain material from websites or documents of the United States Geological Survey.
