= Shabica Glacier =

Glacier in Antarctica

Shabica Glacier (70°21′S 62°45′W) is a northern tributary glacier to the Clifford Glacier, joining it near its terminus just east of Mount Tenniel, in Palmer Land. Mapped by United States Geological Survey (USGS) in 1974. Named by Advisory Committee on Antarctic Names (US-ACAN) for Stephen V. Shabica, United States Antarctic Research Program (USARP) biologist and Station Scientific Leader at Palmer Station in 1970.
