= Kvinge =

Kvinge may refer to:

- Thor Kvinge (born 1929), Norwegian Antarctic scientist
- Frank Kvinge (born 1968), Norwegian jazz musician
- Kvinge Peninsula, a geographic feature on Antarctica
