= Kvinge Peninsula =

Peninsula located in Antarctica

- Location within Antarctica

Geography
- Location: Palmer Land, Antarctica
- Coordinates: 71°10′S 61°10′W

Kvinge Peninsula (71°10′S 61°10′W) is a snow-covered peninsula at the north side of Palmer Inlet terminating in Cape Bryant, on the east coast of Palmer Land, Antarctica.

== Location ==
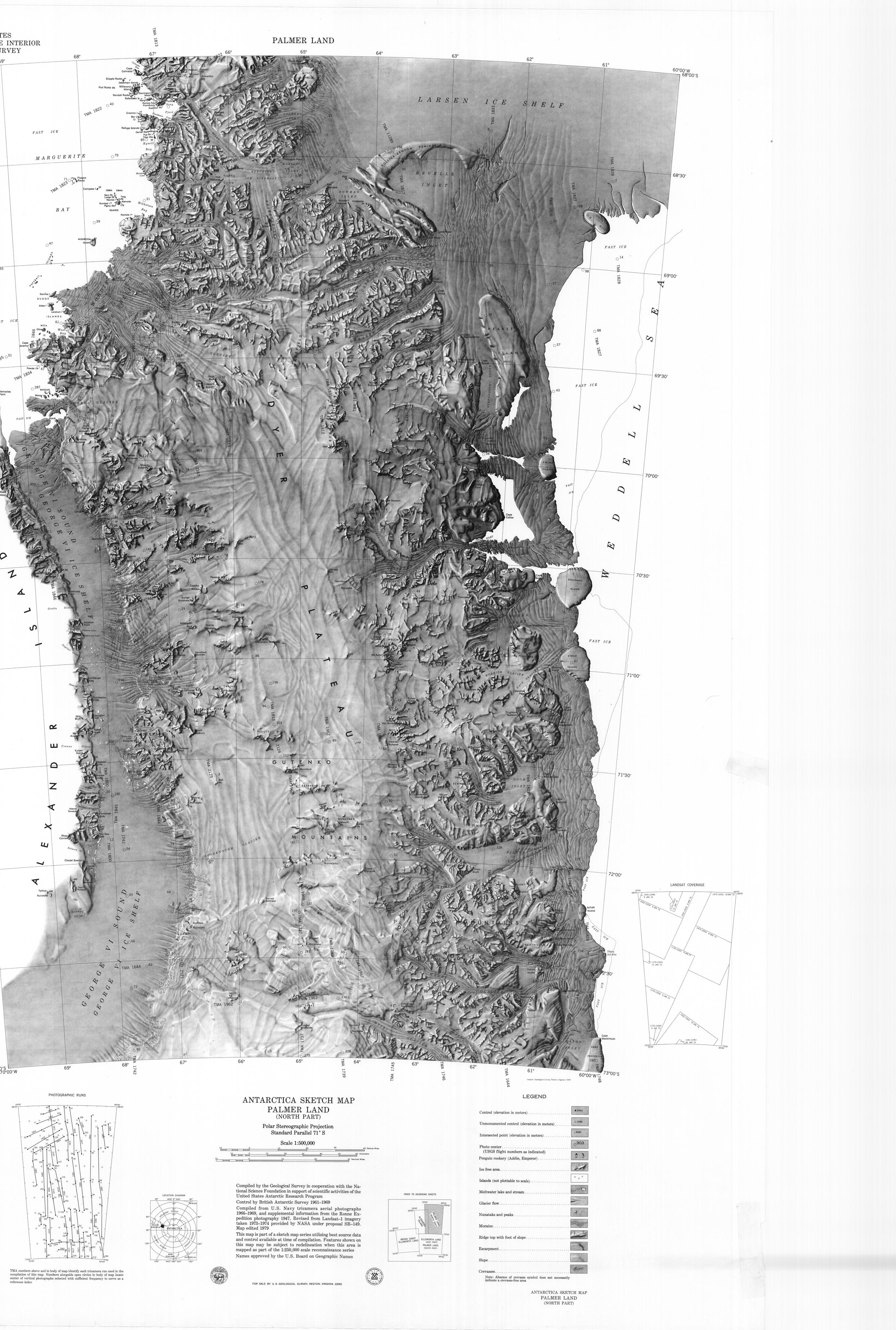
Northern Palmer Land. Kvinge Peninsula in southeast of map

The Kvinge Peninsula is on the Black Coast of Palmer Land, beside the Weddell Sea to the east. The Imshaug Peninsula and Lehrke Inlet are to the north. Morency Island and the larger Steele Island are to the northeast. To the south the Kvinge Peninsula is bounded by the Kauffman Glacier, which flows from Singleton Nunatak into Palmer Inlet. Palmer Inlet's mouth is between Cape Musselman on Foster Peninsula to the south and Cape Bryant to the north on Kvinge Peninsula. To the west, Gain Glacier northeast flows to the sea past Singleton Nunatak and Marshall Peak. It is joined by Murrish Glacier from the left (west), which in turn is joined by Guard Glacier. Features to the west include Neshyba Peak, Stockton Peak and Abendroth Peak.

== Mapping and name ==
The Kvinge Peninsula was mapped by the United States Geological Survey (USGS) in 1974. It was named by the United States Advisory Committee on Antarctic Names (US-ACAN) for Thor Kvinge, a Norwegian oceanographer from the University of Bergen. Kvinge was a member of the International Weddell Sea Oceanographic Expeditions, 1968, 1969 and 1970.

== Glaciers ==
=== Kauffman Glacier ===
71°15′S 61°18′W. Broad, smooth glacier, 7 nautical miles (13 km; 8.1 mi) long, flowing eastward into the head of Palmer Inlet. Mapped by USGS in 1974. Named by US-ACAN for Thomas A. Kauffman, United States Antarctic Research Program (USARP) biologist and Station Scientific Leader at Palmer Station in 1973.

=== Gain Glacier ===
71°01′S 61°25′W. A large glacier flowing northeast from Cat Ridge and entering the Weddell Sea between Imshaug Peninsula and Morency Island. Mapped by USGS in 1974. Named by US-ACAN for Louis Gain, naturalist on the French Antarctic Expedition, 1908-10, author of several of the expedition reports on zoology and botany.

=== Cat Ridge ===
71°10′S 61°50′W. A ridge in the middle of Gain Glacier. A descriptive name applied by US-ACAN. When viewed from northeastward, the limbs of the ridge are suggestive of a sprawling cat.

=== Murrish Glacier ===
71°02′S 61°45′W. A glacier about 15 nautical miles (28 km; 17 mi) long. It drains east-northeast, to the north of Stockton Peak and Abendroth Peak, and merges with the north side of Gain Glacier before the latter enters Weddell Sea opposite Morency Island. Named by US-ACAN for David E. Murrish, USARP biologist, party leader for the study of peripheral vascular control mechanisms in birds in the Antarctic Peninsula region for three seasons, 1972-75.

=== Guard Glacier ===
71°01′S 62°10′W. A broad tributary glacier that drains east along the south margin of Parmelee Massif to join Murrish Glacier, on the east side of Palmer Land. Mapped by USGS in 1974. Named by US-ACAN for Charles L. Guard, USARP biologist who (with David E. Murrish) made investigations of peripheral vascular control mechanisms in birds in the Antarctic Peninsula region for three seasons, 1972-75.

== Eastern features ==
=== Singleton Nunatak ===
71°15′S 61°36′W. A nunatak located directly west of the head of Kauffman Glacier. Named by the UK Antarctic Place-Names Committee (UK-APC) after David G. Singleton, British Antarctic Survey (BAS) geologist who worked in the general vicinity of this feature.

=== Palmer Inlet ===
71°15′S 61°10′W. An ice-filled inlet 7 nautical miles (13 km; 8.1 mi) long, lying between Cape Bryant and Cape Musselman. Essentially rectangular in shape, it is bordered by almost vertical cliffs. Discovered by members of East Base of the USAS who explored this coast by land and from the air in 1940. Named for Robert Palmer, assistant to the meteorologist at the East Base.

=== Cape Musselman ===
71°17′S 61°00′W Cape forming the south side of the entrance to Palmer Inlet. Discovered by members of the USAS who explored this coast by land and from the air from East Base in 1940. Named for Lytton C. Musselman, member of the East Base party which sledged across Dyer Plateau to the vicinity of Mount Jackson, which stands inland from this cape.

=== Cape Bryant ===
71°12′S 60°55′W. High, snow-covered cape forming the north side of the entrance to Palmer Inlet. Discovered by members of East Base of the USAS who explored this coast by land and from the air in 1940. Named by the USAS for Herwil M. Bryant of the Smithsonian Institution, biologist with the East Base party.

=== Morency Island ===
71°02′S 61°09′W. An island 1 nautical mile (1.9 km; 1.2 mi) long, lying close west of Steele Island and 10 nautical miles (19 km; 12 mi) northwest of Cape Bryant. Discovered by members of the East Base of the USAS who explored this coast by land and from the air in 1940. Named for Anthony J.L. Morency, tractor driver for the East Base.

=== Steele Island ===
71°00′S 60°40′W. A snow-covered island, 12 nautical miles (22 km; 14 mi) long from east to west and 10 nautical miles (19 km; 12 mi) wide, rising above the Larsen Ice Shelf, 12 nautical miles (22 km; 14 mi) southeast of Cape Sharbonneau. The steeply-sloping sides of the island are crevassed, but no rock is exposed. Discovered by members of East Base of the USAS in 1940. Named for Clarence E. Steele, tractor driver for the East Base.

== Western features ==
=== Marshall Peak ===
71°00′S 61°32′W. A peak, 1,205 metres (3,953 ft) high, which is ice covered except for its rocky northeast side, standing 6 nautical miles (11 km; 6.9 mi) northwest of the head of Palmer Inlet. This coast was first explored in 1940 by members of the USAS, but the peak was first charted by a joint party consisting of members of the Ronne Antarctic Research Expedition (RARE) and Falkland Islands Dependencies Survey (FIDS) in 1947. Named by the FIDS for Norman B. Marshall, zoologist at the FIDS Hope Bay base in 1945-46.

=== Neshyba Peak ===
71°14′S 62°45′W. A small, sharp peak, mostly snow covered, surmounting the north part of a complex ridge 16 nautical miles (30 km; 18 mi) east-northeast of Mount Jackson. Mapped by USGS in 1974. Named by US-ACAN for Stephen Neshyba, USARP oceanographer who studied the laminar structure of the bottom water in the Antarctic Peninsula area, 1972-73.

=== Stockton Peak ===
71°08′S 62°10′W. A sharp, mostly ice-covered peak along the south side of the upper part of Murrish Glacier, 6 nautical miles (11 km; 6.9 mi) west-northwest of Cat Ridge. Named by US-ACAN for William L. Stockton, USARP biologist at Palmer Station in 1972.

=== Abendroth Peak ===
71°05′S 62°00′W. A peak 4 nautical miles (7.4 km; 4.6 mi) northeast of Stockton Peak on the divide between the Murrish Glacier and Gain Glacier. Named by US-ACAN for Ernst K. Abendroth, USARP biologist at Palmer Station in 1968.

== Sources ==
- Alberts, Fred G., ed. (1995), Geographic Names of the Antarctic (PDF) (2 ed.), United States Board on Geographic Names This article incorporates public domain material from websites or documents of the United States Board on Geographic Names.
- Palmer Land, USGS: United States Geological Survey

This article incorporates public domain material from websites or documents of the United States Geological Survey.
