= Richardson Glacier =

Richardson Glacier could refer to

- Richardson Glacier (Antarctica)
- Richardson Glacier (New Zealand), in the headwaters of the Waitaki River basin
- Richardson Glacier (Washington), a glacier in the North Cascades of Washington, USA
