= Bell Rock =

Bell Rock may refer to:

- Bell Rock (Antarctica), a nunatak in the Goodenough Glacier, Palmer Land, Antarctica
- Bell Rock (Arizona), a butte near Sedona, United States
- Inchcape or the Bell Rock, a reef off the east coast of Angus, Scotland with a lighthouse
