= Berry Massif =

Mountain in Antarctica

Berry Massif (70°27′S 62°30′W) is a compact, roughly circular and mostly snow-covered massif located at the south side of the terminus of Clifford Glacier, where the latter enters Smith Inlet, on the east coast of Palmer Land. It was mapped by the United States Geological Survey in 1974, and named by the Advisory Committee on Antarctic Names for Dale L. Berry, United States Antarctic Research Program biologist who was Station Scientific Leader at Palmer Station in 1971.
