= Kubitza Glacier =

Glacier in Antarctica

Kubitza Glacier (70°24′S 63°11′W) is a northern tributary glacier to the Clifford Glacier, joining it just east of Mount Samsel in Palmer Land, Antarctica. It was mapped by the United States Geological Survey in 1974, and was named by the Advisory Committee on Antarctic Names for J.T. Kubitza, U.S. Navy, Chief Builder in the construction detachment at Palmer Station in 1969–70.
