= Tenniel =

Tenniel may refer to:

- John Tenniel (1820–1914), Victorian illustrator famous for his illustrations of Lewis Carroll's work
- Tenniel Chu (born 1976), Hong Kong entrepreneur
- Tenniel Evans (1926–2009), Welsh actor
- Mount Tenniel, a mountain in Antarctica

== See also ==
- Teniel Campbell (born 1997), racing cyclist from Trinidad and Tobago
- Tennielle Madis (born 2007), Filipino tennis player
- Tenille, a given name
