= Thor Kvinge =

Norwegian oceanographer (born 1929)

Thor Kvinge (born Os, Bergen, Norway 23 December 1929) is a Norwegian oceanographer, polar explorer, scientist, and researcher of Antarctica. Kvinge Peninsula bears his name. He was an assistant professor at the University of Bergen until 1978 and Senior Scientist at Christian Michelsen Research until 1996.

== Career ==
Kvinge participated in the IWSOE-Cruises in 1968, 1969, 1970 and in 1973. In 1969 and 1970 he served as Chief Scientist (scientific leader) of the Weddell Sea Expedition.

In 1978 he participated in the Ross Ice Shelf Program "CRISP". He retired in 1996.

== Legacy ==
Kvinge Peninsula, located on the Antarctic continent, was mapped by the United States Geological Survey in 1974, and named by the Advisory Committee on Antarctic Names for the contributions of Thor Kvinge to Antarctic research.
