= Lehrke Inlet =

Inlet in Antarctica

- Location within Antarctica
- Location: Black Coast, Antarctic Peninsula, Antarctica
- Coordinates: 70°49′S 61°45′W
- Type: Inlet
- Ocean/sea sources: Weddell Sea

Lehrke Inlet (70°49′S 61°45′W) is an ice-filled inlet, 8 nautical miles (15 km; 9.2 mi) wide, which recedes southwest for 17 nautical miles (31 km; 20 mi) between Cape Boggs and Cape Sharbonneau, along the east coast of Palmer Land, Antarctica.

== Location ==
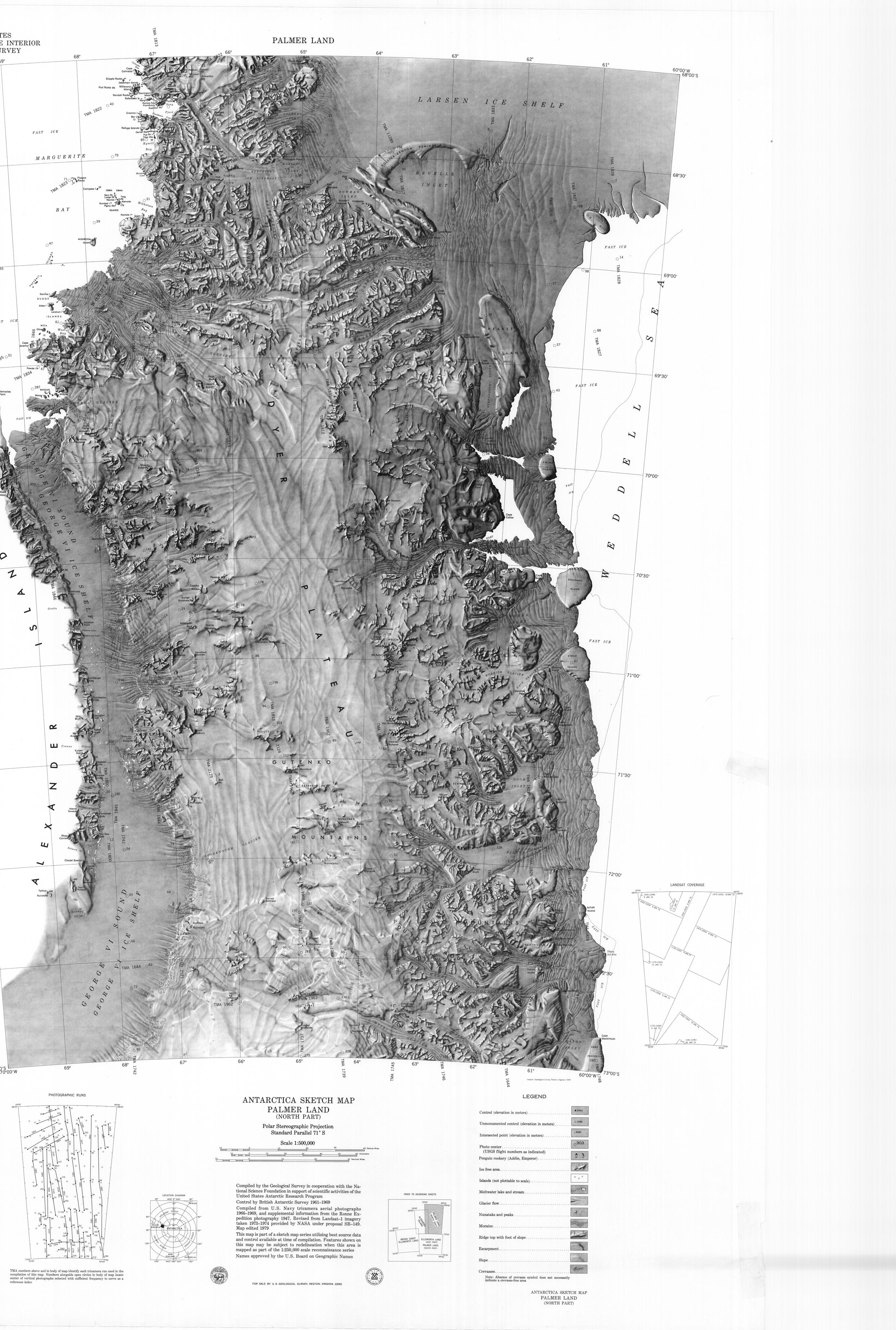
Northern Palmer Land. Lehrke Inlet east of center of map

The Lehrke Inlet of the Weddell Sea is on the east coast of Palmer Land, at the north end of the Black Coast (Note: The Black Coast extends from Cape Boggs, the north point of the mouth of Lehrke Inlet, south to Cape Mackintosh.) of the Antarctic Peninsula. It is south of the Eielson Peninsula and Dolleman Island, and north of the Imshaug Peninsula and Steele Island. The Eland Mountains are to the northwest and the Welch Mountains are to the west-southwest. Glaciers feeding the inlet include, clockwise from the south, Gain Glacier, Dana Glacier, Yates Glacier, Matheson Glacier and Ashton Glacier. Other features include Cape Boggs, Cape Sharbonneau, Mount Hill on the Imshaus Peninsula, Neilson Peak on the Parmalee Massif, and Dawson Head.

== Discovery and name ==
Lehrke Inlet was discovered by members of the United States Antarctic Service (USAS) who explored this coast on land and from the air in 1940. It was named for Lester Lehrke, boatswain's mate of USS Bear, one of the expedition ships, and sailmaker of the East Base.

== Glaciers ==
=== Dana Glacier ===
70°55′S 62°23′W. A glacier about 30 nautical miles (56 km; 35 mi) long. It drains the slopes at the southeast side of the Welch Mountains and flows east then northeast to discharge into the head of Lehrke Inlet just north of Parmelee Massif. Mapped by the United States Geological Survey (USGS) in 1974. Named by the United States Advisory Committee on Antarctic Names (US-ACAN) for Commander John B. Dana, United States Navy, Commanding Officer of United States Navy Squadron VXE-6 in Antarctica during Operation Deep Freeze, 1973; he was squadron Executive Officer, 1972, and Operations Officer, 1971.

=== Yates Glacier ===
70°49′S 62°12′W. A glacier 3 nautical miles (5.6 km; 3.5 mi) south of Matheson Glacier, discharging into the west side of Lehrke Inlet. Named by the UK Antarctic Place-Names Committee (UK-APC) after J. Yates, British Antarctic Survey (BAS) surveyor who worked in the general vicinity of this feature.

=== Matheson Glacier ===
70°47′S 62°05′W. A glacier 11 nautical miles (20 km; 13 mi) long, lying 2 nautical miles (3.7 km; 2.3 mi) south of Ashton Glacier, which it parallels, and flowing in an east direction to the west side of Lehrke Inlet. First sighted by members of the USAS who explored this coast by land and from the air in December 1940. First charted by a joint party consisting of members of the Ronne Antarctic Research Expedition (RARE) and Falkland Islands Dependencies Survey (FIDS) in 1947. Named by the FIDS for J. Matheson, a member of the FIDS at the Port Lockroy and Hope Bay bases, 1944-46.

=== Ashton Glacier ===
70°44′S 61°57′W. A glacier 9 nautical miles (17 km; 10 mi) long, which flows east-southeast from Mount Thompson to the northwest side of Lehrke Inlet, on the east coast of Palmer Land. The glacier was photographed from the air in December 1940 by the USAS, and was probably seen by the USAS ground survey party which explored this coast. A joint party consisting of members of the RARE and the FIDS charted the glacier in 1947. Named by the FIDS for L. Ashton, carpenter with the FIDS at the Port Lockroy and Hope Bay bases in 1944-45 and 1945-46, respectively.

== Other features ==
=== Dolleman Island ===
70°37′S 60°45′W. Rounded, ice-covered island, 13 nautical miles (24 km; 15 mi) long, lying 8 nautical miles (15 km; 9.2 mi) east of Cape Boggs. Discovered in 1940 by members of East Base of the US AS. Named for Heinrich Dolleman, tractor driver for the East Base.

=== Cape Boggs ===
70°33′S 61°23′W. Bold, ice-covered headland marking the east extremity of Eielson Peninsula. Discovered by members of East Base of the USAS who charted this coast by land and from the air in 1940. Named for S.W. Boggs, Geographer, United States Department of State, whose political and geographical studies of Antarctica were used by the USAS.

=== Cape Sharbonneau ===
70°50′S 61°27′W. A rounded, snow-covered headland forming the south side of the entrance to Lehrke Inlet. Members of the East Base of the USAS explored this coast in 1940. They charted this feature as an island which they named for Charles W. Sharbonneau, carpenter at East Base. It was determined to be a cape of Palmer Land in 1947 by a joint sledge party consisting of members of the RARE and the FIDS.

=== Imshaug Peninsula ===
70°53′S 61°35′W. A broad, snow-covered peninsula at the south side of Lehrke Inlet on the east coast of Palmer Land. Mapped by USGS in 1974. Named by US-ACAN for Henry A. Imshaug, United States Antarctic Research Program (USARP) biologist in a longrange biosystematic study of subantarctic floras with research at Juan Fernández Islands, 1965-66; Falkland Islands, 1967-68; Chilean archipelago, 1969; Campbell Island, 1969-70; and lies Kerguelen, 1970-71.

=== Mount Hill ===
70°56′S 61°42′W. A mountain, 945 metres (3,100 ft) high, standing 8 nautical miles (15 km; 9.2 mi) southwest of Cape Sharbonneau at the east side of the head of Lehrke Inlet. Discovered by members of the East Base of the USAS who explored this coast by land and from the air in 1940. They named it Cape Hill for Archie C. Hill, cook at East Base. In 1947 it was determined to be a mountain distinct from Cape Sharbonneau to the northeast by a joint sledge party consisting of members of the RARE and the FIDS.

=== Parmelee Massif ===
70°58′S 62°10′W. A rugged mountain massif standing west of the base of Imshaug Peninsula at the head of Lehrke Inlet. Mapped by USGS in 1974. Named by US-ACAN for David F. Parmelee, USARP biologist who studied birds of the Antarctic pack ice ecosystems in the Antarctic Peninsula area from aboard icebreakers in 1972-73, 1973-74 and 1974-75.

=== Neilson Peak ===
70°57′S 62°13′W. A peak in the central part of Parmelee Massif at the head of Lehrke Inlet. Mapped by USGS in 1974. Named by US-ACAN for David R. Neilson, USARP biologist at Palmer Station, 1975.

=== Dawson Head ===
70°43′S 61°57′W. A high coastal point, or headland, along the northwest side of Lehrke Inlet. Mapped by USGS in 1974. Named by US-ACAN for Captain Opie L. Dawson, USCG (Ret.), Commanding Officer of the USCGC Glacier during the International Weddell Sea Oceanographic Expedition, 1968.

== Sources ==
- Alberts, Fred G., ed. (1995), Geographic Names of the Antarctic (PDF) (2 ed.), United States Board on Geographic Names This article incorporates public domain material from websites or documents of the United States Board on Geographic Names.
- Palmer Land, USGS: United States Geological Survey

This article incorporates public domain material from websites or documents of the United States Geological Survey.
