= Moe Point =

Moe Point (70°19′S 62°23′W) is a point consisting of a small bare rock bluff, located just south of Croom Glacier on the northwest side of Smith Inlet, in Palmer Land, Antarctica. It was mapped by the United States Geological Survey in 1974, and was named by the Advisory Committee on Antarctic Names for Richard Moe, a United States Antarctic Research Program biologist at Palmer Station in 1974.
