= Dolleman Island =

Island in Palmer Land, Antarctica

- Location within Antarctica

Geography
- Location: Antarctica
- Coordinates: 70°37′S 60°45′W

Administration
- Administered under the Antarctic Treaty System

Demographics
- Population: Uninhabited

Dolleman Island is a rounded, ice-covered island, 24 kilometres (13 nmi) long, lying 15 kilometres (8 nmi) east of Cape Boggs, off the east coast of Palmer Land. It was discovered in 1940 by members of East Base of the US Antarctic Service.

The island was named in honour of S-Sgt. Hendrik (Henry) Dolleman (1905-1990) of Manchester, New Hampshire, and born at 20 March 1905 in Deventer in the Netherlands. He was a retired career serviceman in the United States Air Force who served with Admiral Richard E. Byrd in Antarctica on the 1939 and 1955 Deep Freeze expeditions. Mr. Dolleman was also a sled dog trainer. In 1942, when Dolleman was stationed at Westover Field, Massachusetts, he won the Soldier's Medal with an oak leaf cluster for his participation in two polar rescue missions.

== Ice cores ==
The British Antarctic Survey (BAS) has used Dolleman Island as an ice core drilling site in 1976, 1986 and 1993. The main findings from these cores are related to the migration of MSA within the ice (Pasteur and Mulvaney, 2000) and the identification of past atmospheric circulation change signals in the core (Peel and Mulvaney, 1992; Russell et al., 2006).

More information on Dolleman Island and its namesake may be found in the book Antarctic Command by Captain Finn Ronne, U.S.N.R. (Indianapolis: Bobbs-Merrill Co., first print edition, 1961) LCCN 61-7893.
