= Goodenough Glacier =

Glacier in Antarctica

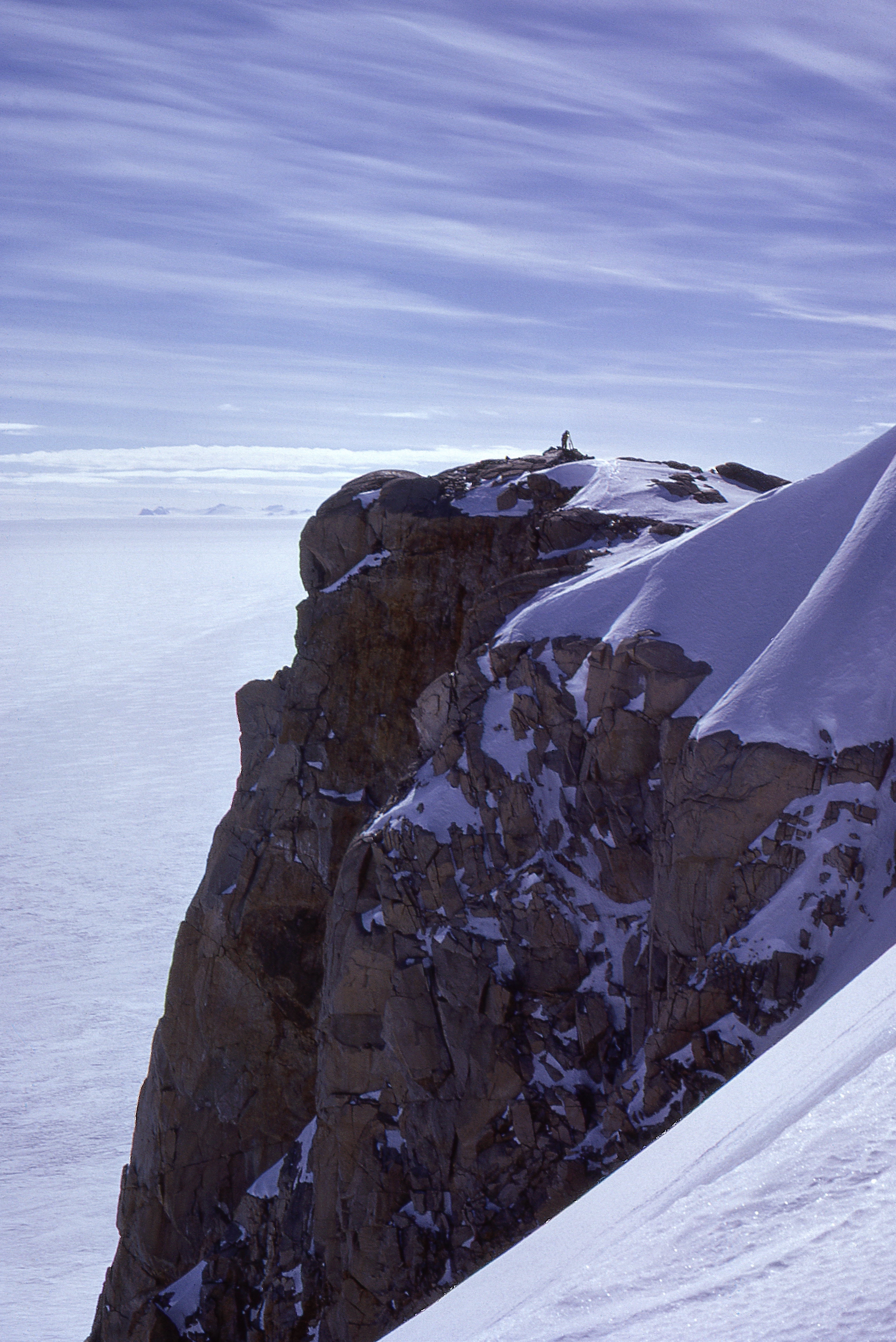
- Barrett Buttress overlooking Goodenough Glacier

- Location within Antarctica
- Location: Palmer Land, Antarctica
- Coordinates: 72°0′S 66°40′W

The Goodenough Glacier (72°0′S 66°40′W) is a broad sweeping glacier to the south of the Batterbee Mountains, flowing from the west shore of Palmer Land, Antarctica, into George VI Sound and the George VI Ice Shelf.

== Location ==
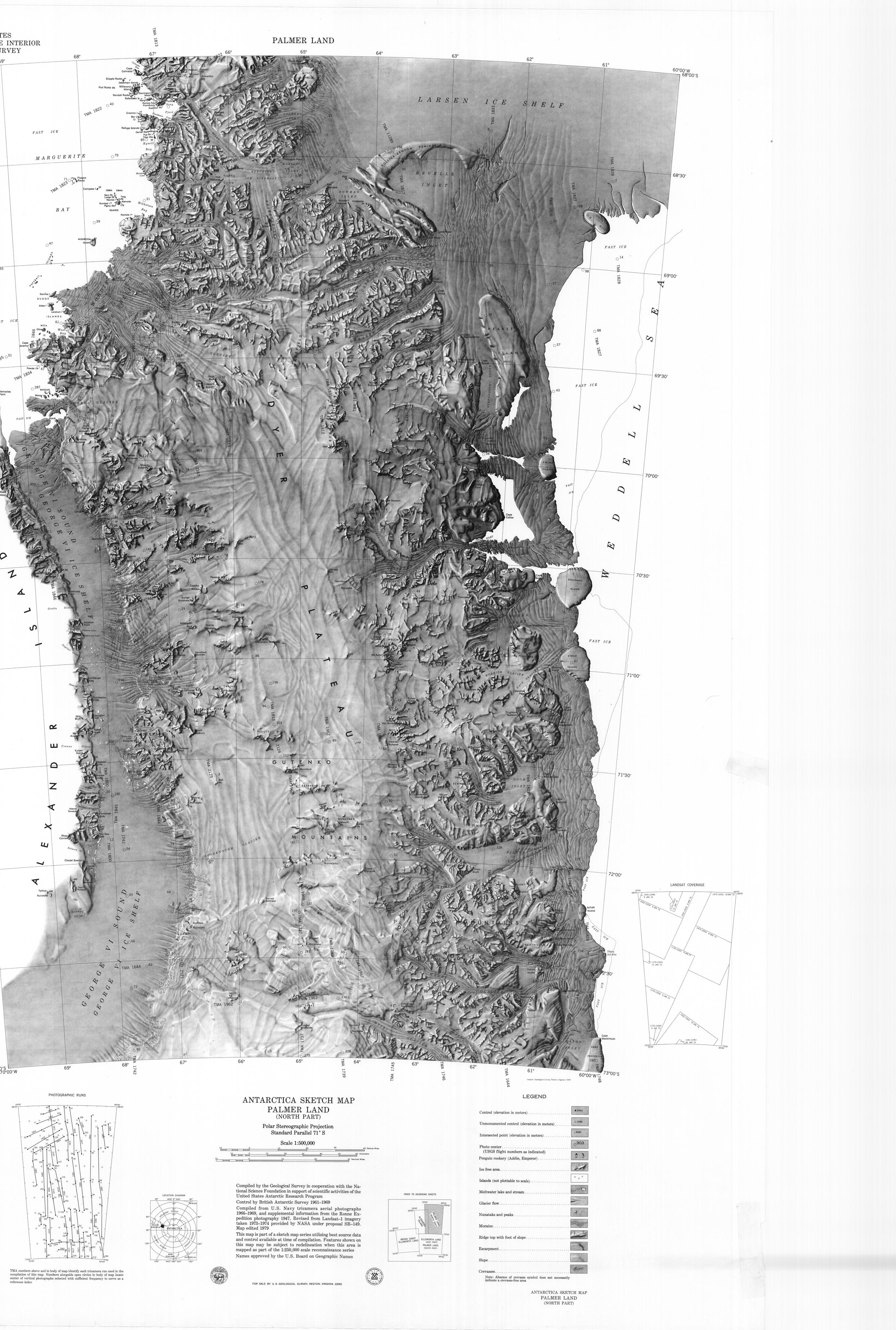
Palmer Land. Goodenough Glacier towards southwest of map

The Goodenough Glacier is in the west of central Palmer Land on the Rymill Coast. It flows west from the Gutenko Mountains, at the south end of the Dyer Plateau, to George VI Ice Shelf in George VI Sound to the west. The Batterbee Mountains are to the north and the Seward Mountains are to the east. Features in or around the glacier include, clockwise from the northwest, Horne Nunataks, Bell Rock, Guthridge Nunataks, Blanchard Nunataks, Barrett Buttress and Buttress Nunataks.

== Discovery and name ==
The Goodenough Glacier was discovered in 1936 by A. Stephenson, Launcelot Fleming, and George C.L. Bertram of the British Graham Land Expedition (BGLE) under John Rymill, while exploring George VI Sound, and was named by Rymill after Margaret Goodenough, wife of Admiral Sir William Goodenough, the latter being one of Rymill's principal supporters in raising funds for the expedition.

== Features ==
=== Horne Nunataks ===
71°42′S 66°46′W. A group of six nunataks in relative isolation, located on the north side of Goodenough Glacier, about 7 nautical miles (13 km; 8.1 mi) inland from the west coast of Palmer Land. Named by the UK Antarctic Place-Names Committee (UK-APC) for Ralph R. Horne, BAS geologist at the Adelaide and Stonington Island stations in 1964-65.

=== Bell Rock ===
71°35′S 66°26′W. A very conspicuous and isolated nunatak on Goodenough Glacier, located 12 nautical miles (22 km; 14 mi) east of Mount Ward. Named by UK-APC for Charles M. Bell, BAS geologist at Fossil Bluff, 1968-71.

=== Barrett Buttress ===
72°13′S 65°36′W. A nunatak rising to 1,600 metres (5,200 ft) high at the south margin of Goodenough Glacier, 9 nautical miles (17 km; 10 mi) southwest of Blanchard Nunataks. The feature has a sheer northwest face 150 metres (490 ft) high; the southeast side is level with the snow plateau. Mapped by the United States Geological Survey (USGS) from United States Navy aerial photographs taken 1966-69. Named by the UK-APC in 1977 after Richard G. Barrett, British Antarctic Survey (BAS) surveyor at Stonington Island and Adelaide Island stations, 1974-76.

=== Buttress Nunataks ===
72°22′S 66°47′W. Group of prominent coastal rock exposures, the highest 635 metres (2,083 ft) high, lying close inland from George VI Sound and 10 nautical miles (19 km; 12 mi) west-northwest of the Seward Mountains, on the west coast of Palmer Land. First seen from a distance and roughly surveyed in 1936 by the BGLE under Rymill. Visited and resurveyed in 1949 by the Falkland Islands Dependencies Survey (FIDS), who gave this descriptive name.

== Sources ==
- Alberts, Fred G., ed. (1995), Geographic Names of the Antarctic (PDF) (2 ed.), United States Board on Geographic Names This article incorporates public domain material from websites or documents of the United States Board on Geographic Names.
- Palmer Land, USGS: United States Geological Survey

This article incorporates public domain material from websites or documents of the United States Geological Survey.
