= Eland Mountains =

Mountain range in Palmer Land, Antarctica

- Location within Antarctica

Geography
- Region(s): Palmer Land, Antarctica
- Range coordinates: 70°35′S 63°10′W

The Eland Mountains (70°35′S 63°10′W) are a range of mountains which rise above 2,440 metres (8,010 ft) and extend about 20 nautical miles (37 km; 23 mi) in a northeast–southwest direction along the south side of Clifford Glacier, on the east coast of Palmer Land, Antarctica.

== Location ==
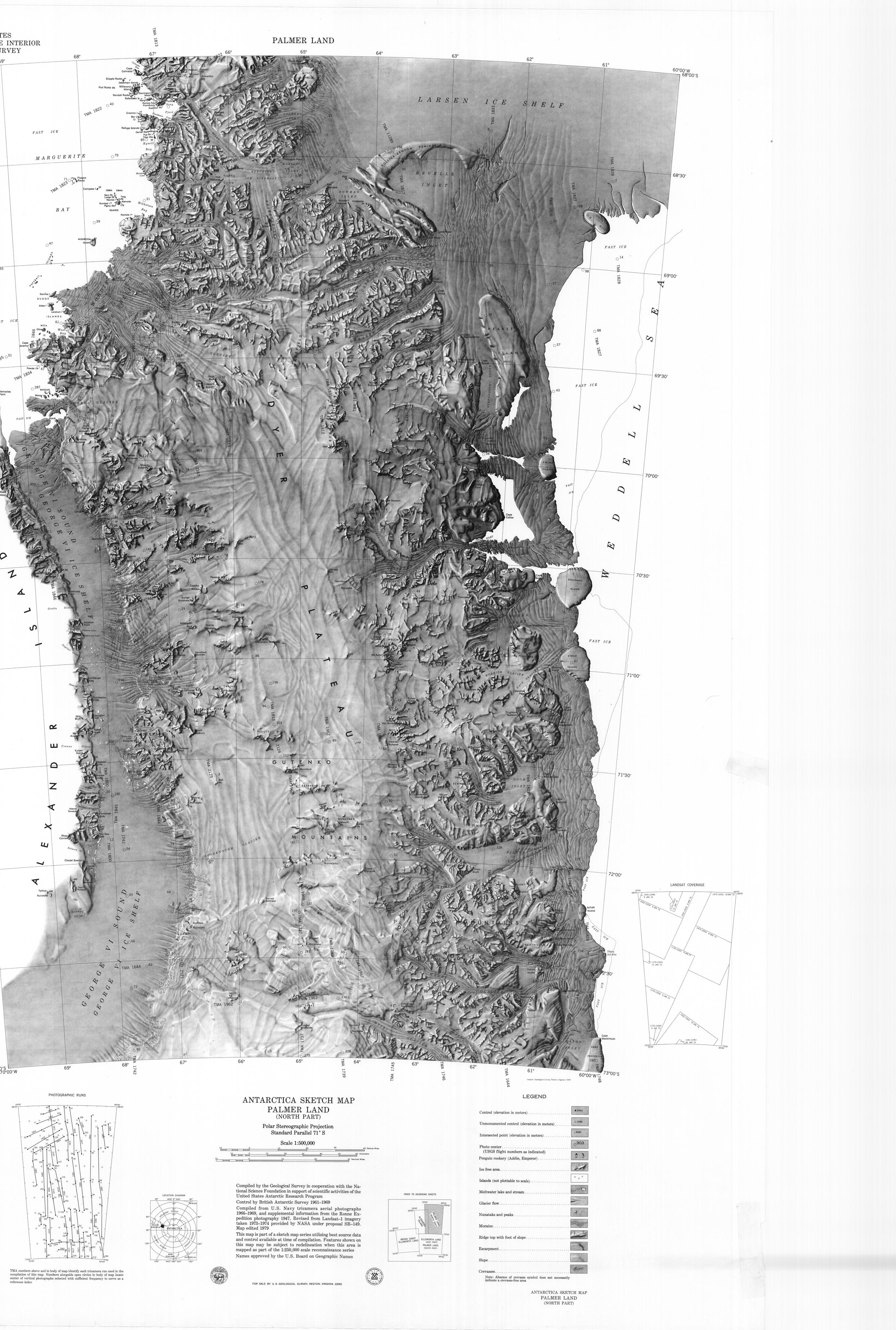
Northern Palmer Land. Smith Inlet east of center of map

The Eland Mountains are near the Wilkins Coast of central Palmer Land, which borders the Weddell Sea to the east. They are west of the Eielson Peninsula, north of the Welch Mountains, east of the Dyer Plateau, southeast of the Columbia Mountains and southwest of Hughes Ice Piedmont. They run along the south side of the Clifford Glacier above the point where it enters Smith Inlet.

== Discovery and name ==
The Eland Mountains were discovered in 1936 by the British Graham Land Expedition (BGLE), and they appear in aerial photographs taken by the United States Antarctic Service (USAS) in September 1940. During 1947 they were photographed from the air by members of the Ronne Antarctic Research Expedition (RARE), who in conjunction with the Falkland Islands Dependencies Survey (FIDS), charted them from the ground. The name Eland, Lady Clifford's maiden name, was given in 1952 by Sir Miles Clifford, Governor of the Falkland Islands, at the request of members of the FIDS staff.

== Features ==
Features and nearby features include Peters Bastion, Mount Strong, Hall Ridge, Clark Hills, Kelley Massif, Reynolds Bench, Temnikow Nunataks and Daniels Hill.

=== Peters Bastion ===
70°27′S 62°54′W. The large, mainly ice-free mountain forming the northernmost summit of the Eland Mountains. Mapped by the United States Geological Survey (USGS) in 1974. Named by the United States Advisory Committee on Antarctic Names (US-ACAN) for Commander Vernon W. Peters, United States Navy, Commanding Officer of Squadron VXE-6 in Antarctica during Operation Deep Freeze, 1974.

=== Mount Strong ===
70°35′S 62°45′W. A ridge-like mountain about 5 nautical miles (9.3 km; 5.8 mi) east of the Eland Mountains. Mapped by USGS in 1974. Named by US-ACAN for Frank E. Strong, USARP biologist at Palmer Station in 1971-72.

=== Hall Ridge ===
70°42′S 63°12′W. A low, snow-covered ridge 5 nautical miles (9.3 km; 5.8 mi) south of the Eland Mountains. Mapped by the USGS in 1974. Named by US-ACAN for Captain Phillip L. Hall, United States Army, Assistant Civil Engineering Officer on the staff of the Commander, Naval Support Force, Antarctica, during Operation Deep Freeze, 1969 and 1970.

=== Clark Hills ===
70°43′S 63°25′W. A cluster of low, mainly snow-covered hills of about 4 nautical miles (7.4 km; 4.6 mi) extent, located 5 nautical miles (9.3 km; 5.8 mi) southwest of the Eland Mountains. Mapped by USGS in 1974. Named by US-ACAN for Kerry B. Clark, United States Antarctic Research Program (USARP) biologist on the International Weddell Sea Oceanographic Expedition in 1968 and 1969.

=== Kelley Massif ===
70°39′S 63°35′W. A rugged mountain massif, 10 nautical miles (19 km; 12 mi) long, located immediately west of the Eland Mountains and along the south side of Clifford Glacier. Mapped by the USGS in 1974. Named by US-ACAN for Captain Hugh A. Kelley, United States Navy, Commander of Antarctic Support Activities during Operation Deep Freeze 1968 and 1969.

=== Reynolds Bench ===
70°35′S 63°40′W. A nearly flat bench, or mesa-like feature, 6 nautical miles (11 km; 6.9 mi) long and 2 nautical miles (3.7 km; 2.3 mi) wide, that has a smooth, snow-covered surface but has rock outcroppings along its steep sides. The feature stands at the north side of the Kelley Massif, to which it appears to be joined, along the south side of the upper Clifford Glacier. Mapped by USGS in 1974. Named by US-ACAN for Richard L. Reynolds, geologist with the USGS Lassiter Coast geologic and mapping party in 1970-71.

=== Temnikow Nunataks ===
70°37′S 64°10′W. A rather scattered group of low rock outcroppings over an area of about 6 nautical miles (11 km; 6.9 mi), located at the east margin of Dyer Plateau and 5 nautical miles (9.3 km; 5.8 mi) west of Kelley Massif. Mapped by the USGS in 1974. Named by US-ACAN for Nicolas Temnikow, USARP biologist at Palmer Station in 1974.

=== Daniels Hill ===
70°34′S 64°36′W. A prominent solitary nunatak that rises above the ice in the eastern part of the Dyer Plateau, approximately 15 nautical miles (28 km; 17 mi) west of the head of Clifford Glacier. Mapped by USGS in 1974. Named by US-ACAN for Robert Daniels, USARP biologist at Palmer Station, 1975.

== Sources ==
- Alberts, Fred G., ed. (1995), Geographic Names of the Antarctic (PDF) (2 ed.), United States Board on Geographic Names This article incorporates public domain material from websites or documents of the United States Board on Geographic Names.
- Palmer Land, USGS: United States Geological Survey

This article incorporates public domain material from websites or documents of the United States Geological Survey.
