= Richardson Glacier (Antarctica) =

Glacier in Antarctica

Richardson Glacier (70°28′S 63°42′W) is the broad northwest tributary to the Clifford Glacier, entering it just southeast of Mikus Hill in Palmer Land. Mapped by the United States Geological Survey (USGS) in 1974. Named by Advisory Committee on Antarctic Names (US-ACAN) after Harriet Richardson, French zoologist, author of a number of reports on the Crustacea (Isopoda) collected by the French Antarctic Expeditions of 1903-05 and 1908–10.
