= Mount Jackson (Antarctica) =

Mountain in Antarctica

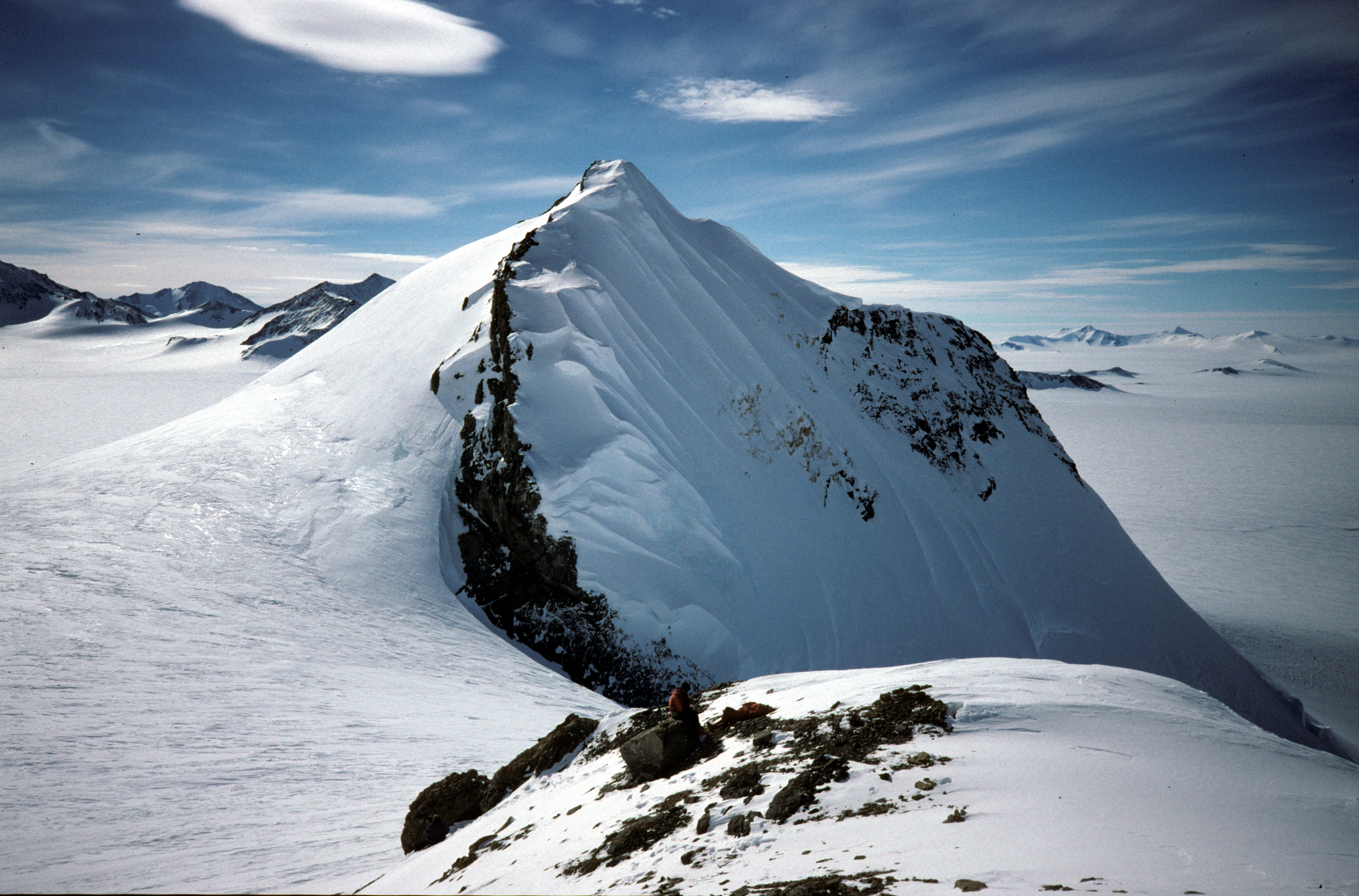
- South-east of Mount Jackson ridge

Highest point
- Elevation: 3,184 m (10,446 ft)
- Prominence: 1,384 m (4,541 ft)
- Listing: Ribu
- Coordinates: 71°23′S 63°22′W

Geography
- Location within Antarctica
- Location: Antarctica

Climbing
- First ascent: 23 November 1964 by J C Cunningham (1927–80) of BAS team.

Mount Jackson (Mount Andrew Jackson and Mount Ernest Gruening) is a mountain that dominates the upland of the southern part of the Antarctic Peninsula. It is located in Palmer Land, part of the British Antarctic Territory (with unrecognised claims by Chile and Argentina). With an elevation of 3,184 metres (10,446 ft), Mount Jackson was once thought to be the highest mountain in the Antarctic Peninsula and the British Antarctic Territory, before the true height of Mount Hope (Eternity Range) was measured. Discovered by members of the United States Antarctic Service, 1939–41, it was named for Andrew Jackson, the seventh President of the United States. The first ascent of Mount Jackson was made by a team led by John Crabbe Cunningham of the British Antarctic Survey (BAS) in 1964. Mount Jackson's geology was studied in 1972 as part of the Palmer Island investigations by a team of geologists.

== Topography ==
Mount Jackson and the Welch Mountains demarcate the central Black Coast, which is dissected by many inlets and is bounded on the west by Dyer Plateau of central Palmer Land. The two mountains rise above the ice shelf with reliefs of about 1,200–1,500 metres (3,900–4,900 ft) towards the east. They are interconnected by icefall zones forming a plateau with steep snow slopes. Mount Jackson rises from its southeast flanks, displaying a steeple summit, whilst the north flank is occupied by a vast cirque. Supraglacial moraines on the mountain's east side measure between 1–5 kilometres (0.62–3.11 mi) in length and display boulders at their distal ends.

== History ==
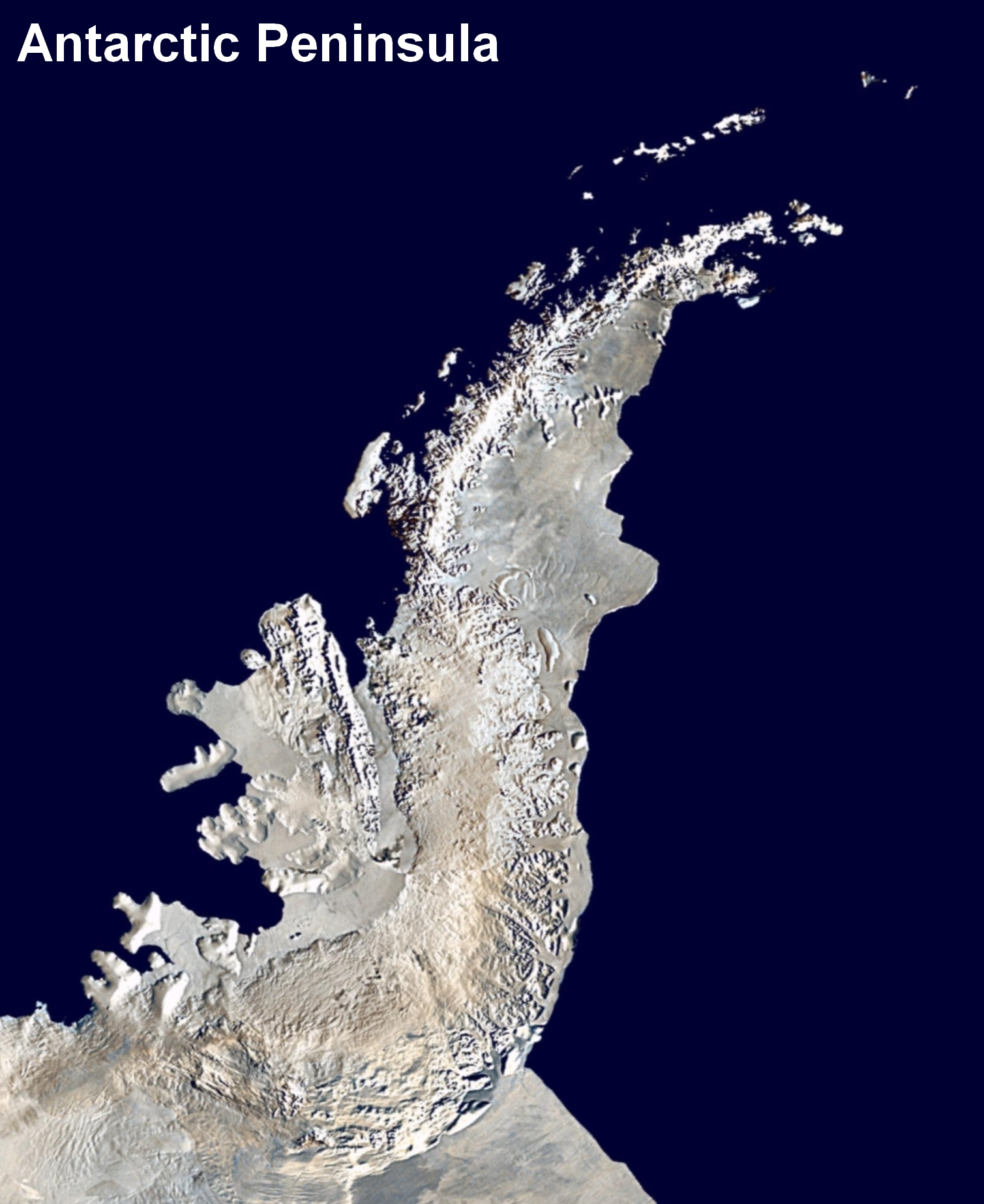
Satellite image of the Antarctic Peninsula

The first topographic mapping of Mount Jackson was carried out in November 1940 by a sledge party of the United States Antarctic Service (USAS). The ground survey was facilitated by aerial photographs and aerial observations. The height was estimated at 4,200 metres (13,800 ft), and the mountain was named Mount Ernest Gruening after the Governor of the Alaska Territory at that time, Ernest Gruening. USAS later renamed it Mount Jackson for the seventh President of the United States. President Jackson signed the bill into law authorizing the United States Exploring Expedition of 1838–42. The expedition, led by Lt. Charles Wilkes, included exploration and surveying of the Pacific Ocean and surrounding lands, including Antarctica.

In November 1947, a Falkland Islands Dependencies Survey ground party based at Stonington Island observed Mount Jackson and estimated its height at 3,050 metres (10,010 ft), considerably lower and more accurate than the first estimate in 1940. After the Falkland Islands Dependencies Survey was renamed the British Antarctic Survey in 1962, a series of depots were developed, including one at Mount Jackson. BAS members were successful in making many first ascents of the mountains of the Antarctic Peninsula, and John Cunningham, who served at the BAS base at Adelaide Island, was the first to climb Mount Jackson. Traveling by dog sled for 640 kilometres (400 mi), his team reached the summit on 23 November 1964.

A precise height of the summit was determined by a BAS survey party who ascended the peak during the austral summer of 1996–97.

== Geography ==
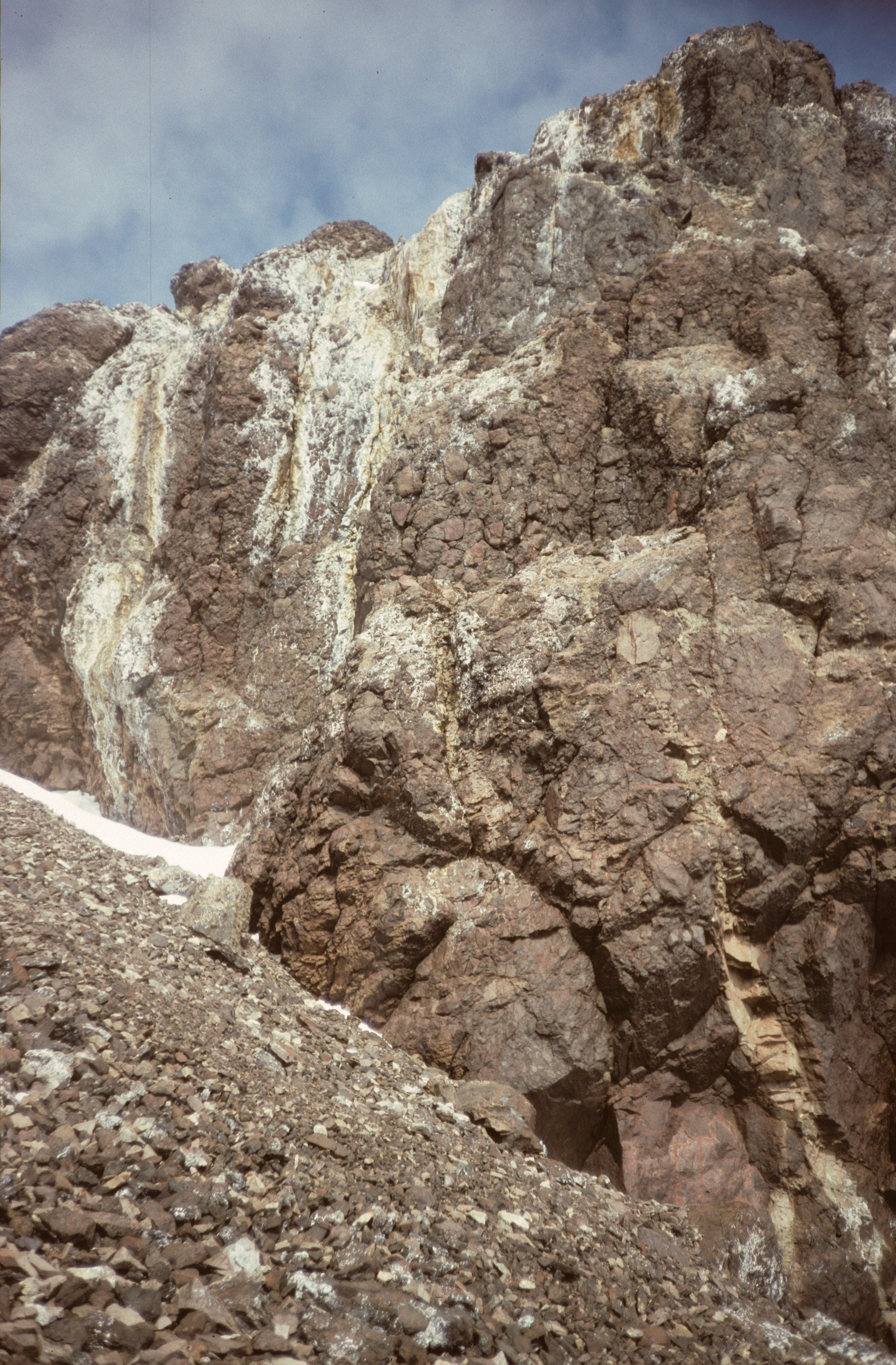
Exposed rock formation on the southern slope of Mount Jackson, showing a mixed mafic/felsic breccia face

The mountain is 3,184 metres (10,446 ft) in height, with a prominence of 1,384 metres (4,541 ft) and a saddle DEM of 1,901 metres (6,237 ft). Mount Jackson and the Welch Mountains demarcate the central Black Coast, which is dissected by many inlets and is bounded on the west by Dyer Plateau of central Palmer Land, with elevation ranging between 2,000–3,000 metres (6,600–9,800 ft), and on the west side of the central Black Coast. The two mountains rise above the ice shelf with reliefs of about 1,200–1,500 metres (3,900–4,900 ft) towards the east. They are interconnected by icefall zones forming a plateau with steep snow slopes. The northern part of the mountain system, which extends over 1,590 kilometres (990 mi), covers most of the Antarctic Peninsula, and Mount Jackson is its highest peak.

Mount Jackson rises from its southeast flanks, displaying a steeple summit, whilst the north flank is occupied by a vast cirque. Supraglacial moraines on the mountain's east side measure between 1–5 kilometres (0.62–3.11 mi) in length and display boulders at their distal ends. Mount Jackson and the Rowley Massif are separated by Odom Inlet. Cline Glacier drains eastern Mount Jackson before arriving at Odom Inlet.

Mount Jackson's geology was studied in 1972 as part of the Palmer Island investigations by a team of geologists. They identified various rock types and underlying volcanic activity. The relief of the west facing slopes is gentler when compared to the eastern side, characterized by a steep rocky face. Rock weathering is intense in the area spread with scree and felsenmeer. Fresh rock formations and bedrock disintegration are noted.

== Nearby features ==
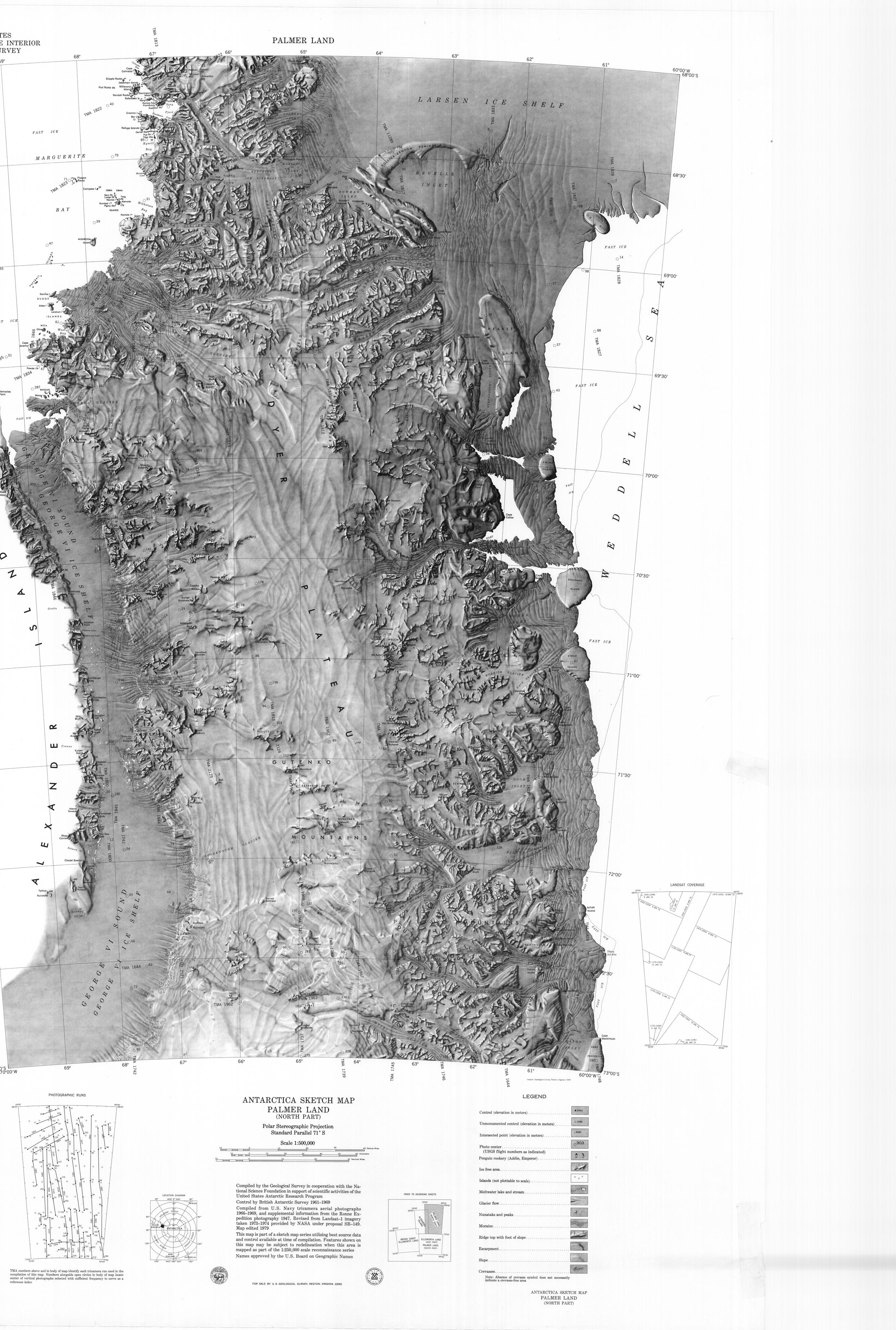
Northern Palmer Land. Welch Mountains east of center of map

Nnearby features include, from north to south, Mount Van Buren, Swarson Nunatak, Davis Ridge and Musson Nunatak.

=== Mount Van Buren ===
71°18′S 63°30′W. The prominent mountain 3 nautical miles (5.6 km; 3.5 mi) north-northwest of Mount Jackson, at the east side of the Dyer Plateau. Mapped by the United States Geological Survey (USGS) in 1974. The name was applied by the United States Advisory Committee on Antarctic Names (US-ACAN) in association with Mount Jackson. Martin Van Buren (1782-1862) was the eighth President of the United States, 1837-41. He was Vice President, 1833-37, during the second term of President Andrew Jackson.

=== Swarsen Nunatak ===
71°25′S 63°39′W. A conspicuous nunatak, largely snow covered, located 5 nautical miles (9.3 km; 5.8 mi) southwest of Mount Jackson. Mapped by the USGS in 1974. Named by the US-ACAN for Lieutenant Commander Ronald J. Swarsen, United States Navy Reserve, Medical Officer at Byrd Station, 1971, and at the South Pole Station, 1973.

=== Davis Ridge ===
71°24′S 63°00′W. A ridge of irregular shape, apparently an outlier of the Mount Jackson massif. It rises above the ice surface 6 nautical miles (11 km; 6.9 mi) east-southeast of the summit of Mount Jackson. Mapped by the USGS in 1974. Named by the US-ACAN for Brent L. Davis, USARP biologist at Palmer Station, 1971, and in the Antarctic Peninsula area, 1974-75 season.

=== Musson Nunatak ===
71°31′S 63°27′W. A pyramidal nunatak standing 10 nautical miles (19 km; 12 mi) south of Mount Jackson, at the east margin of the Dyer Plateau. Mapped by the USGS in 1974. Named by the US-ACAN for John M. Musson, PH2, United States Navy, photographer and member of the cartographic aerial mapping crew in LC-130 aircraft of Squadron VXE-6, 1968-69.

== Sources ==
- Alberts, Fred G., ed. (1995), Geographic Names of the Antarctic (PDF) (2 ed.), United States Board on Geographic Names This article incorporates public domain material from websites or documents of the United States Board on Geographic Names.
- "Antarctica Ultra-Prominences", Peaklist.org, "Footnote (14) from site: Elevation from American Alpine Journal (1999). GNIS offers elevation of 3050m."
- British Antarctic Survey (1969). Annual Report. Natural Environment Research Council. p. 5. ISBN 9780856650727.
- Commonwealth Secretariat (1 April 2004). Commonwealth Yearbook 2004. Stylus Pub Llc. ISBN 978-0-11-703227-9.
- Encyclopaedia of mountaineering. Robert Hale. 1975. ISBN 978-0-7091-4804-3.
- Exploring the Frozen World (PDF), Mountain World, Climb Magazine.com, "Ascent of the highest mountain in the entire Peninsula, Mount Jackson at 3,184 metres (10,446 ft) well to the south in remote Palmer Land, fell to the Scot, John Cunningham, in 1964"
- Hattersley-Smith, G. (1988), Mountaineers and Skiers in British Antarctic Territory Place-names (PDF), Alpine Journal Org., "Of the many young mountaineers that have served at the BAS stations over the years, space allows mention of only two. J. C. Cunningham (1927–80) … on 23 November 1964 he led the first ascent of Mount Jackson, Palmer Land 3,180 metres (10,430 ft); the highest peak in the BAT."
- Headland, Robert K. (2009). A Chronology of Antarctic Exploration. Bernard Quaritch Limited. ISBN 978-0-9550852-8-4.
- Herzfeld, Ute C. (2004). Atlas of Antarctica: Topographic Maps from Geostatistical Analysis of Satellite Radar Altimeter Data : with 169 Figures. Springer. ISBN 978-3-540-43457-3.
- "Mount Jackson". Peakbagger.
- New satellite imagery reveals new highest Antarctic Peninsula Mountain, British Antarctic Survey, 11 December 2017
- Palmer Land, USGS: United States Geological Survey
- Riffenburgh, Beau (2007). Encyclopedia of the Antarctic: A-K, Index. CRC Press. ISBN 978-0-415-97024-2.
- Rubin, Jeff (1 November 2008). Antarctica 4. Lonely Planet. ISBN 978-1-74104-549-9.
- Sailing Directions (planning Guide & Enroute) for Antarctica. The Agency. 2002.
- "SCAR Gazetteer Ref. No 7021: Jackson, Mount". Gazetteer of the British Antarctic Territory. Archived from the original on 26 December 2015.
- Singleton, D.G. (1976). "Physiography and Glacial Geomorphology of the Central Black Coast, Palmer Land" (PDF). British Antarctic Survey Bulletin, Antarctica.ac.uk. Archived from the original (PDF) on 18 May 2013.

This article incorporates public domain material from websites or documents of the United States Geological Survey.
