= Welch Mountains =

Group of mountains in Palmer Land, Antarctica

- Location within Antarctica

Geography
- Region(s): Palmer Land, Antarctica
- Range coordinates: 70°57′S 63°30′W

Welch Mountains (70°57′S 63°30′W) is a group of mountains that dominate the area, the highest peak rising to 3,015 metres (9,892 ft), located 25 nautical miles (46 km; 29 mi) north of Mount Jackson on the east margin of the Dyer Plateau of Palmer Land, Antarctica

== Location ==
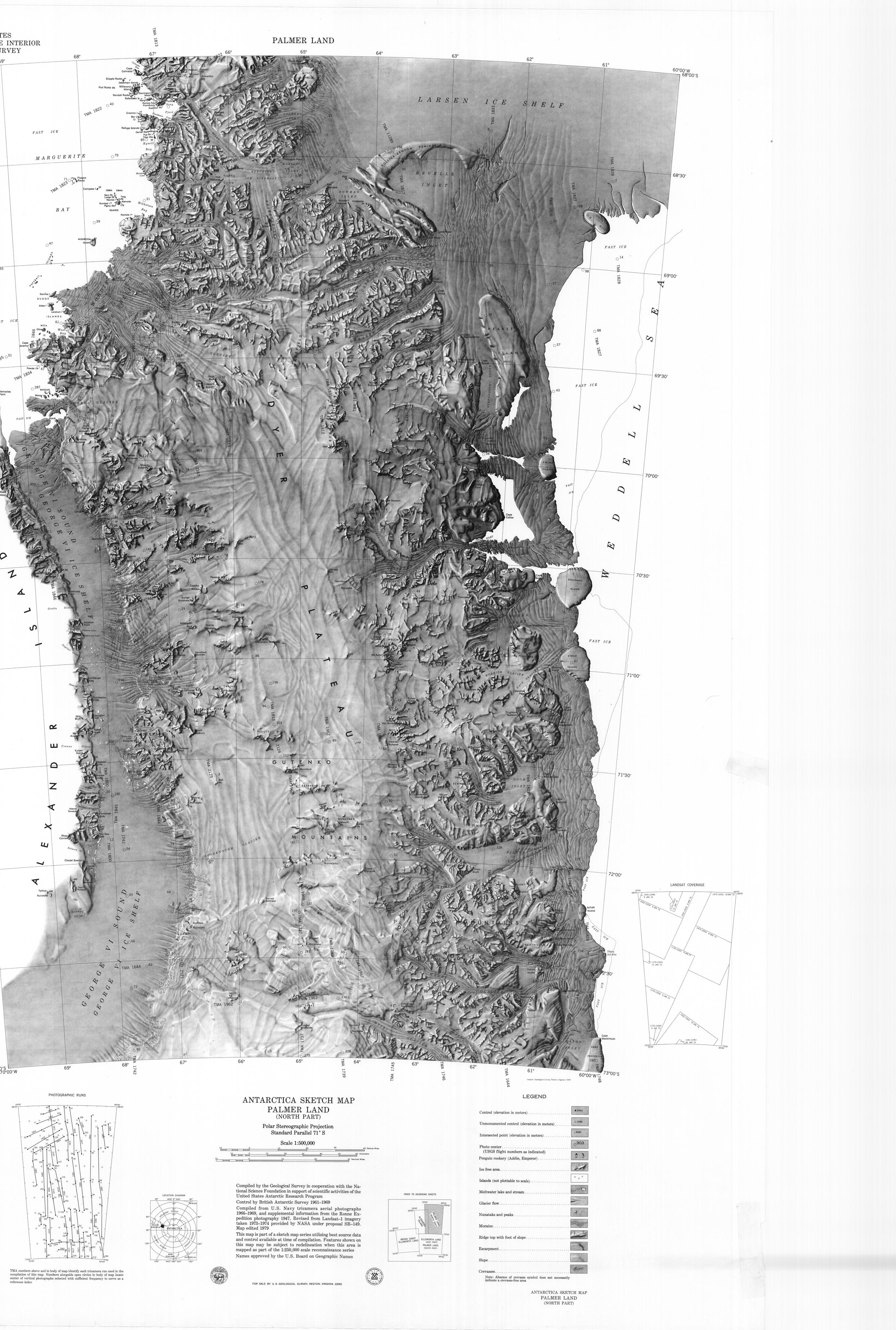
Northern Palmer Land. Welch Mountains east of center of map

The Welch Mountains are near the Black Coast of central Palmer Land, which borders the Weddell Sea to the east. They are west-southwest of Lehrke Inlet, west-northwest of the Kvinge Peninsula, north of Mount Jackson, east of the Dyer Plateau and south of the Eland Mountains.

== Discovery and name ==
The Welch Mountains were probably seen from the air by Lincoln Ellsworth in 1935 and their north extremities were sketched in 1936 by a British Graham Land Expedition (BGLE) sledge party under John Rymill. In 1940 they were photographed from the air and charted from the ground by the United States Antarctic Service (USAS), and in the expedition reports and charts were assumed to be Ellsworth's Eternity Range. They were mapped in detail by United States Geological Survey (USGS) in 1974. Named by The United States Advisory Committee on Antarctic Names (US-ACAN) for Rear Admiral David F. Welch, Commander, United States Naval Support Force, Antarctica, 1969–71.

== Western features ==
Western features include, from north to south, Mount Schimansky, Liston Nunatak, Heintz Peak, Mount Acton and Fry Peak.

=== Heintz Peak ===
70°56′S 63°42′W. The summit at the north end of the west ridge of the Welch Mountains, about 2 nautical miles (3.7 km; 2.3 mi) north of Mount Acton. Mapped by USGS in 1974. Named by US-ACAN for Lieutenant Commander Harvey L. Heintz, United States Navy, Commander of LC-130 aircraft during Operation Deep Freeze, 1969 and 1970.

=== Mount Acton ===
70°58′S 63°42′W. The high, dominant peak of the west ridge of the Welch Mountains. Mapped by USGS in 1974. Named by US-ACAN for Commander William Acton, United States Navy, Operations Officer on the staff of the Commander, United States Naval Support Force, Antarctica, 1967-68, and Executive Officer, 1968-69.

=== Fry Peak ===
71°03′S 63°40′W. A sharp-pointed peak which is the southernmost peak in the Welch Mountains. Mapped by USGS in 1974. Named by US-ACAN for Lieutenant Frederick M. Fry, United States Navy, Flight Surgeon and member of the para-rescue team of United States Navy Squadron VXE-6 during Operation Deep Freeze 1969 and 1970.

== Eastern features ==
Eastern features include, from north to south, Mount Curl, Gatlin Peak, Steel Peak, Mount Nordhill, Kosky Peak.

=== Gatlin Peak ===
70°47′S 63°18′W. A prominent but somewhat detached snow-covered peak, rising 4.5 nautical miles (8.3 km; 5.2 mi) northeast of Steel Peak at the northeast end of the Welch Mountains. Mapped by the USGS in 1974. Named by US-ACAN for Lieutenant Donald H. Gatlin, United States Navy Reserve, navigator on LC-130 aerial photographic flights during Operation Deep Freeze 1968 and 1969.

=== Steel Peak ===
70°54′S 63°27′W. A high peak 1.5 nautical miles (2.8 km; 1.7 mi) north of Mount Nordhill in the east ridge of the Welch Mountains. Mapped by USGS in 1974. Named by US-ACAN for Captain Henry E. Steel, USCG, Commanding Officer of USCGC Edisto during Operation Deep Freeze, 1969 and 1970, and Commander of the Antarctic Peninsula Ship Group, 1969.

=== Mount Nordhill ===
70°55′S 63°27′W. A high, sharp-pointed peak between Steel Peak and Kosky Peak in the east ridge of the Welch Mountains. The peak was mapped by USGS in 1974. Named by US-ACAN for Commander Claude H. Nordhill, United States Navy, Operations Officer of Squadron VXE-6 in Antarctica during Operation Deep Freeze, 1970, and Commanding Officer, 1972.

=== Kosky Peak ===
70°57′S 63°28′W. A peak 1.5 nautical miles (2.8 km; 1.7 mi) south of Mount Nordhill. The peak was mapped by USGS in 1974. Named by US-ACAN for Captain Harry G. Kosky, USCG, Commanding Officer of USCGC Westwind in the Antarctic Peninsula Ship Group during Operation Deep Freeze, 1971.

== Nearby features ==
Nearby features include Giannini Peak, Solem Ridge, Laine Hills.

=== Laine Hills ===
70°46′S 64°28′W. A cluster of four mainly snow-covered hills that rise above the Dyer Plateau about 16 nautical miles (30 km; 18 mi) northwest of the Welch Mountains. Mapped by USGS in 1974. Named by US-ACAN for Daren Laine, USARP biologist at Palmer Station in 1975.

=== Mount Schimansky ===
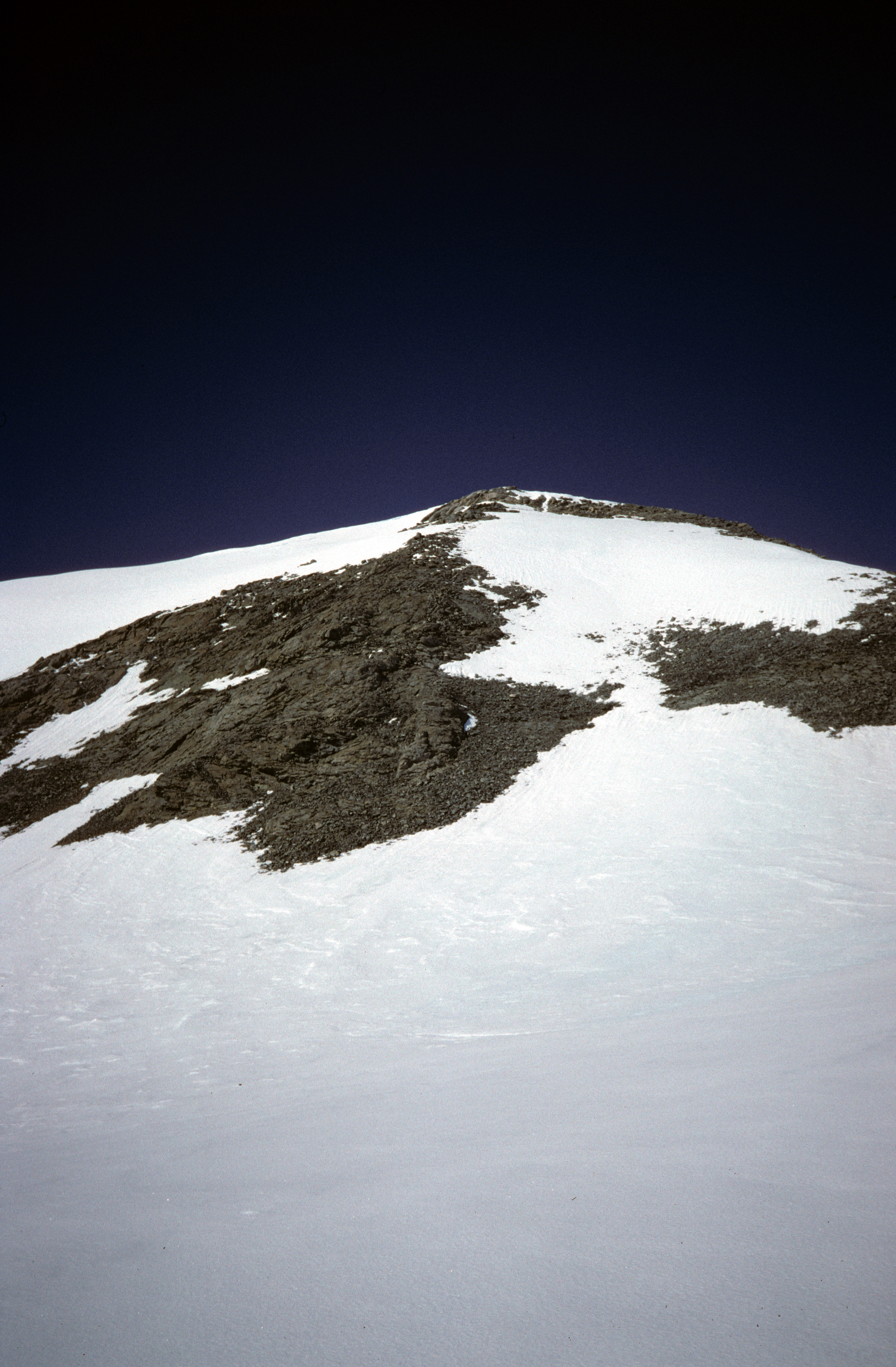
North Mount Schimansky exposure

70°50′S 63°49′W. A ridge-like mountain 6 nautical miles (11 km; 6.9 mi) northwest of Heintz Peak of the Welch Mountains. Mapped by the USGS in 1974. Named by US-ACAN for Lieutenant Commander John A. Schimansky, United States Navy, Commander of LC-130 aircraft of Squadron VXE-6 on many aerial photographic and ice-sensing missions over the Antarctic continent during Operation Deep Freeze, 1970 and 1971.

=== Liston Nunatak ===
70°54′S 63°45′W. A large nunatak immediately northwest of Heintz Peak of the Welch Mountains. Mapped by USGS in 1974. Named by US-ACAN for Commander John M. Listen, United States Navy, Operations Officer for Antarctic Support Activities during Operation Deep Freeze 1969 and Executive Officer, 1970.

=== Mount Curl ===
70°48′S 63°07′W. The snow-covered summit of a ridge located 4 nautical miles (7.4 km; 4.6 mi) east-northeast of Mount Gatlin. Mapped by USGS in 1974. Named by US-ACAN for James E. Curl, USARP glaciologist in the South Shetland Islands, 1971-72, 1972-73 and 1973-74.

=== Giannini Peak ===
71°00′S 62°50′W. A peak 13 nautical miles (24 km; 15 mi) east-southeast of Mount Nordhill in the east part of Palmer Land. The peak stands on the north side of Dana Glacier at the point where the glacier makes a left (NE.) turn toward Lehrke Inlet. Mapped by USGS in 1974. Named by US-ACAN for Albert P. Giannini, USARP biologist at Palmer Station, 1973.

=== Solem Ridge ===
71°12′S 63°15′W. A mostly snow-covered, arc-shaped ridge, 4 nautical miles (7.4 km; 4.6 mi) long, located 10 nautical miles (19 km; 12 mi) north-northeast of Mount Jackson. Mapped by USGS in 1974. Named by US-ACAN for Lieutenant Lynn D. Solem, United States Navy, Medical Officer at the South Pole Station, 1972.

== Sources ==
- Alberts, Fred G., ed. (1995), Geographic Names of the Antarctic (PDF) (2 ed.), United States Board on Geographic Names This article incorporates public domain material from websites or documents of the United States Board on Geographic Names.
- Palmer Land, USGS: United States Geological Survey

This article incorporates public domain material from websites or documents of the United States Geological Survey.
