= Mount Tenniel =

Mountain in Palmer Land, Antarctica

Mount Tenniel (70°20′S 62°48′W) is a mountain, 1,625 m, standing 7 nautical miles (13 km) west-northwest of the mouth of Clifford Glacier on the east coast of Palmer Land. Discovered in 1936 by a British Graham Land Expedition (BGLE) sledge party under Rymill. During 1947 it was photographed from the air by the Ronne Antarctic Research Expedition (RARE) under Ronne, who in conjunction with the Falkland Islands Dependencies Survey (FIDS) charted it from the ground. Named in 1952 by Sir Miles Clifford, Government of the Falkland Islands, for his great-uncle Sir John Tenniel, 1820–1914, noted English illustrating artist, humorist, and political cartoonist.
