= Smith Inlet (Palmer Land) =

Body of water in Palmer Land, Antarctica

- Location within Antarctica
- Location: Wilkins Coast, Antarctic Peninsula, Antarctica
- Coordinates: 70°25′S 62°0′W
- Type: Inlet
- Ocean/sea sources: Weddell Sea

Smith Inlet (70°25′S 62°0′W) is an ice-filled inlet receding 15 nautical miles (28 km; 17 mi) in a westerly direction between Cape Boggs and Cape Collier, along the east coast of Palmer Land, Antarctica.

== Location ==
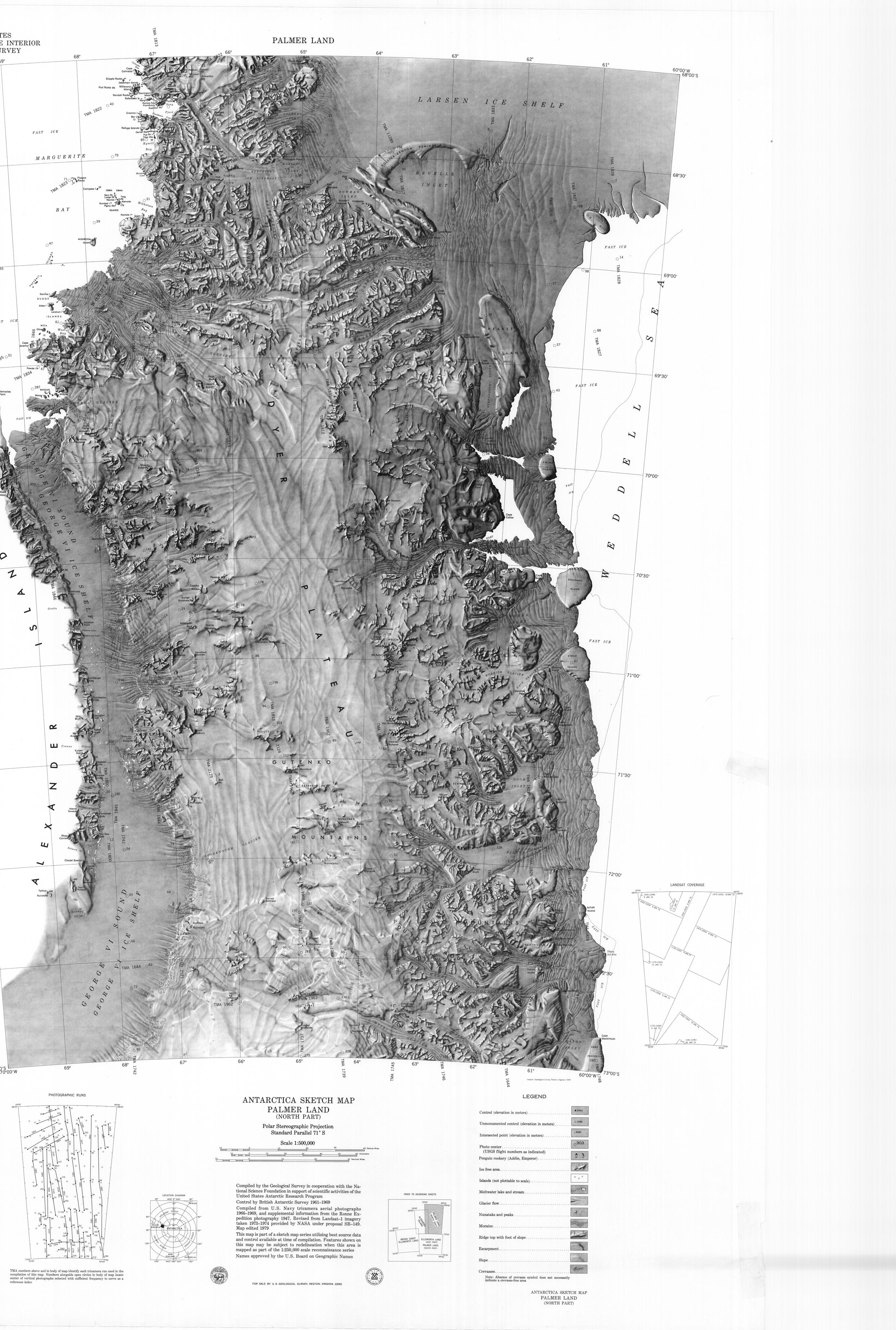
Northern Palmer Land. Smith Inlet east of center of map

The Smith Inlet is in the Wilkins Coast of Palmer Land, beside the Weddell Sea to the east. The Hughes Ice Piedmont is to the north and the Eielson Peninsula is to the south. The Eland Mountains are to the southwest and the Columbia Mountains are to the northwest. The Clifford Glacier, which is fed from the north by the Richardson Glacier, drains into the Smith Inlet from the west. Features to the north include Croom Glacier, Moe Point, Shabica Glacier, Mount Tenniel, Kubitza Glacier, Mount Samsel and Mikus Hill. Features to the south include Cape Boggs, Elder Bluff, Benson Hills, Berry Massif and Peters Bastion.

== Discovery and name ==
Smith Inlet inlet was discovered and charted in 1940 by the United States Antarctic Service (USAS), but it was later erroneously shown on charts as Stefansson Inlet. During 1947 the inlet was photographed from the air by the Ronne Antarctic Research Expedition (RARE) under Finn Ronne, who in conjunction with the Falkland Islands Dependencies Survey (FIDS) charted it from the ground. It was named by Ronne for Rear Admiral Edward H. Smith, USCG, noted Arctic oceanographer and explorer, leader of and later Director of the Woods Hole Oceanographic Institute.

== Northern features ==
=== Croom Glacier ===
Croom Glacier (70°18′S 62°25′W) is a steep, broad glacier flowing to the head of Smith Inlet between Moe Point and Hughes Ice Piedmont, on the east coast of Palmer Land. It was mapped by the United States Geological Survey in 1974, and named by the Advisory Committee on Antarctic Names for John M. Croom, who was a United States Antarctic Research Program biologist at Palmer Station in 1968–69 and a U.S. Exchange Scientist at the Soviet Bellingshausen Station in 1970.

=== Moe Point ===
Moe Point 70°19'S, 62°23'W A point consisting of a small bare rock bluff, located just S of Croom Glacier on the NW side of Smith Inlet. Mapped by USGS in 1974. Named by US-ACAN for Richard Moe, USARP biologist at Palmer Station in 1974.

=== Shabica Glacier ===
Shabica Glacier 70°21'S, 62°45'W A northern tributary glacier to the Clifford Glacier, joining it near its terminus just E of Mount Tenniel. Mapped by USGS in 1974. Named by US-ACAN for Stephen V. Shabica, USARP biologist and Station Scientific Leader at Palmer Station in 1970.

=== Mount Tenniel ===
Mount Tennie, 70°20'S, 62°48'W A mountain, 1,625 m, standing 7 mi WNW of the mouth of Clifford Glacier. Discovered in 1936 by a BGLE sledge party under Rymill. During 1947 it was photographed from the air by the RARE under Ronne, who in conjunction with the FIDS charted it from the ground. Named in 1952 by Sir Miles Clifford, Governor of the Falkland Islands, for his great-uncle Sir John Tenniel, 1820–1914, noted English illustrating artist, humorist, and political cartoonist.

=== Kubitza Glacier ===
Kubitza Glacier 70°24'S, 63°11'W A northern tributary glacier to the Clifford Glacier, joining it just east of Mount Samsel. Mapped by USGS in 1974. Named by US-ACAN for J.T. Kubitza, BUG, USN, Chief Builder in the construction detachment at Palmer Station in 1969–70.

=== Mount Samsel ===
Samsel, Mount 70°24'S, 63815'W A mountain along the N side of Clifford Glacier, just W of the juncture of the Kubitza Glacier, in Palmer Land. Mapped by USGS in 1974. Named by US-ACAN for Gene L. Samsel, USARP biologist at Palmer Station in the 1969–70 and 1970–71 seasons.

=== Mikus Hill ===
Mikus Hill 70°27'S, 63°50'W A hill with a number of bare rock exposures, surmounting the SW wall of Richardson Glacier in Palmer Land. Mapped by USGS in 1974. Named by US-ACAN for Edward J. Mikus, PH3, USN, photographer of the cartographic aerial mapping crew in LC-130 aircraft of Squadron VXE-6, 1968–69.

=== Richardson Glacier ===
Richardson Glacier 70°28'S, 63°42'W The broad NW tributary to the Clifford Glacier, entering it just SE of Mikus Hill. Mapped by the USGS in 1974. Named by US-ACAN after Harriet Richardson, French zoologist, author of a number of reports on the Crustacea (Isopoda) collected by the French Antarctic Expeditions of 1903-05 and 1908–10.

== Southern features ==
=== Benson Hills ===
Benson Hills 70°28'S, 62°17'W A cluster of coastal hills near the head of Smith Inlet, 3 mi E of Berry Massif. Mapped by USGS in 1974. Named by US-ACAN for Lt. Arthur K. Benson, USN, Medical Officer at Palmer Station in 1969.

=== Berry Massif ===
Berry Massif 70°27'S, 62°30'W A compact, roughly circular and mostly snow-covered massif located at the S side of the terminus of Clifford Glacier, where the latter enters Smith Inlet. Mapped by USGS in 1974. Named by US-ACAN for Dale L. Berry, USARP biologist who was Station Scientific Leader at Palmer Station in 1971.

=== Clifford Glacier ===
Clifford Glacier 70°23'S, 62°30'W Broad glacier, about 40 mi long, flowing in an ENE direction to the gap between Mount Tenniel and the Eland Mountains, and then E to Smith Inlet. The upper part of this glacier was charted in 1936 by the BGLE under Rymill; the seaward side by the USAS survey party which explored along this coast in 1940. During 1947 it was photographed from the air by the RARE under Ronne, who in conjunction with the FIDS charted it from the ground. Named in 1952 by the FIDS for Sir G. Miles Clifford, then Gov. of the Falkland Islands.

== Sources ==
- Alberts, Fred G., ed. (1995), Geographic Names of the Antarctic (PDF) (2 ed.), United States Board on Geographic Names This article incorporates public domain material from websites or documents of the United States Board on Geographic Names.
- Palmer Land, USGS: United States Geological Survey

This article incorporates public domain material from websites or documents of the United States Geological Survey.
