= Clifford Glacier =

Glacier in Antarctica

Clifford Glacier (70°23′S 62°30′W) is a broad glacier, about 40 nautical miles (70 km) long, flowing in an east-northeast direction to the gap between Mount Tenniel and the Eland Mountains, and then east to Smith Inlet on the east coast of Palmer Land. The upper part of this glacier was charted in 1936 by the British Graham Land Expedition under John Rymill; the seaward side by the United States Antarctic Service survey party which explored along this coast in 1940. During 1947 it was photographed from the air by the Ronne Antarctic Research Expedition under Finn Ronne, who in conjunction with the Falkland Islands Dependencies Survey (FIDS) charted it from the ground. It was named in 1952 by the FIDS for Sir G. Miles Clifford, at that time Governor of the Falkland Islands.

A geologist and a surveyor reached the middle section, north side, of the glacier on December 2, 1966, having travelled by dog sledge from the British Antarctic Survey's Base E on Stonington Island.
