= International Weddell Sea Oceanographic Expeditions =

Series of scientific research expeditions to the Weddell Sea

The International Weddell Sea Oceanographic Expeditions or IWSOE are a series of scientific research expeditions to the Weddell Sea began in 1967, involving cooperation among Norway, Canada, Chile and the United States.

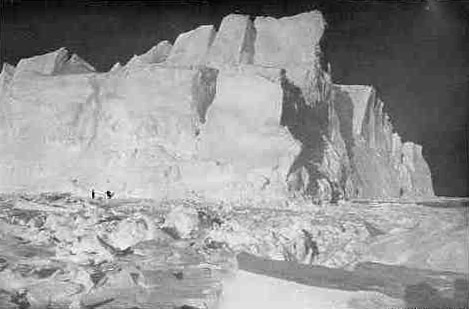
Weddell Sea ice formation (Shackleton expedition 1916)

The Weddell Sea, part of the Southern Ocean, is a unique scientific research environment. The outflow of Weddell Sea Bottom Water and Antarctic Bottom Water formed in the Weddell and Ross Seas is a major source of oceanic deep water and changes affecting the formation of these water masses are liable to have an effect on the circulation of deep water globally. The water of the Weddell Sea is about 1400 m deep at its deepest point; it is exceptionally clear (the Secchi disk visibility reading at 80 metres recorded in the Weddell Sea on 13 October 1986 was the deepest ever, at the theoretical maximum in absolutely pure water). Much of the southern part of the sea is permanent ice, the Filchner-Ronne Ice Shelf, which can be up to 600 m thick.

IWSOE research projects have involved a variety of institutions and covered a wide range of disciplines.

For example, in 1969 scientists from the Universities of Bergen (Norway) and Minnesota, Connecticut and California, Los Angeles (USA), and the US Coast Guard Oceanographic Unit studied the formation of Antarctic Bottom Water, the population density and diversity of the deep sea benthos of the Weddell Sea, the population dynamics of Antarctic seals and sedimentation processes in the Weddell Sea and carried out physical, chemical and photographic oceanographic surveys.

Other subjects of IWSOE research include the Weddell Sea currents and the biology of krill, a species of zooplankton abundance in the area.

The expeditions were initially led aboard the USCGC Glacier, an icebreaker modified for oceanographic research which in 1968 was the first ship to cross the Weddell Sea from the edge of the ice pack to the continental landmass. At the time, the Glacier was the world's largest icebreaker.
