= Dyer Plateau =

Plateau in Palmer Land, Antarctica

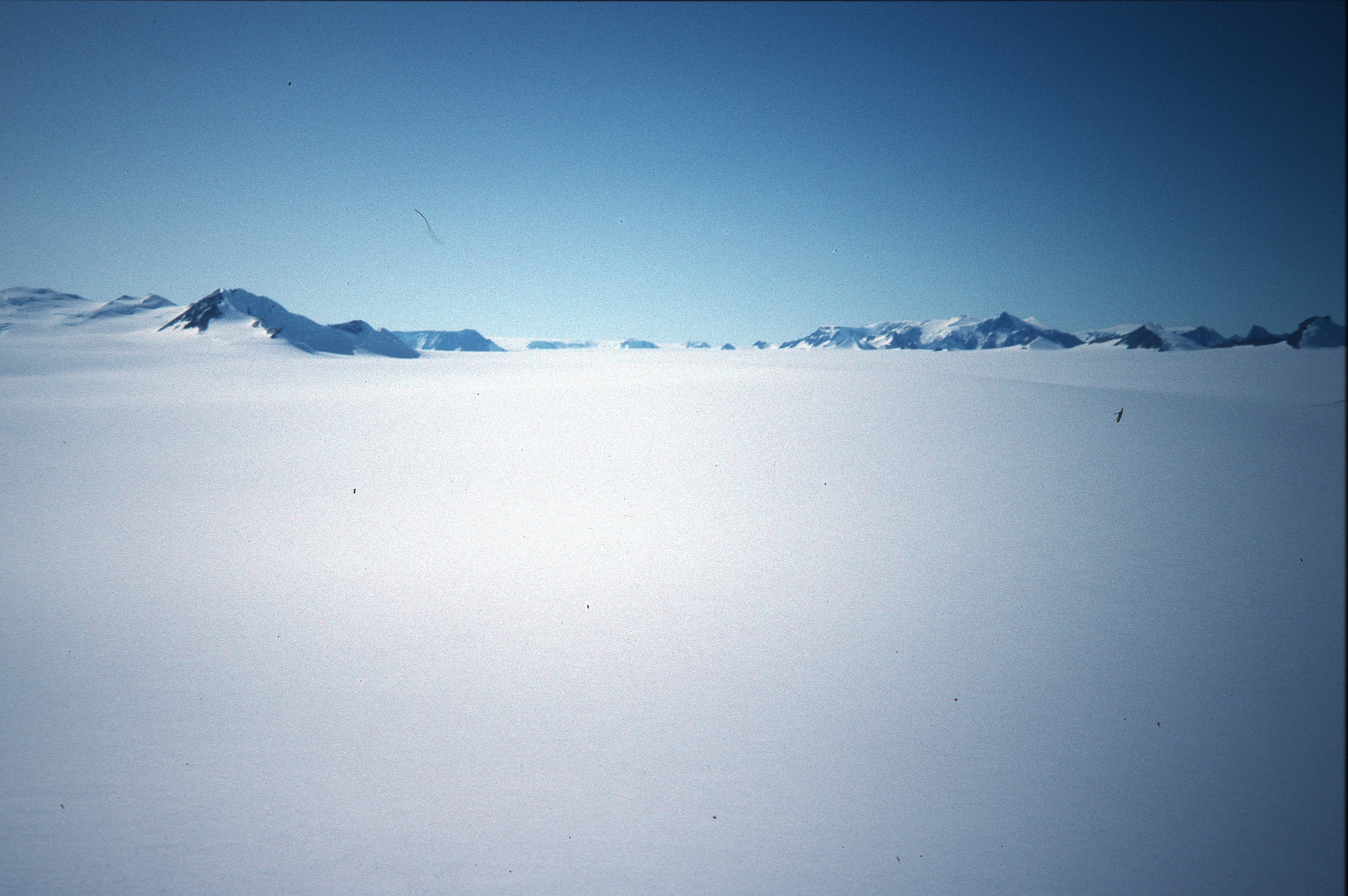
From Creswick Peaks looking east to Dyer Plateau

Dyer Plateau (70°30′S 65°0′W) is a broad ice-covered upland of north-central Palmer Land, bounded to the north by Fleming Glacier and Bingham Glacier, and to the south by the Gutenko Mountains. It is buttressed by Goettel Escarpment.

== History ==
The plateau was first explored on land and photographed from the air by the US Antarctic Service (USAS), 1939–41. It was named after J. Glenn Dyer, a surveyor with the then United States General Land Office, Department of the Interior. He was leader of the USAS surface party which sledged from Fleming Glacier southeast across the plateau to the Welch Mountains, and U.S. observer with the Australian National Antarctic Research Expeditions during the 1956–57 season.

Between 1988 and 1992, a collaborative glaciological and climatological ice core drilling program was conducted on the Dyer Plateau at an elevation of 2,002 meters above sea level, where the mean annual temperature is approximately −21°C. The initiative brought together researchers from the British Antarctic Survey, the University of Washington, and The Ohio State University with the goal of reconstructing a 480-year paleoenvironmental history of the region. The first phase of the project, carried out during the 1988/89 and 1989/90 seasons. The distinct seasonality observed in sulfate concentrations and oxygen isotope ratios within the ice cores allowed for precise annual dating back to the year 1505 CE.

== See also ==
- Laine Hills, a cluster of snow-covered hills that rise above Dyer Plateau
- Pinther Ridge
