= Ronne (disambiguation) =

Ronne or Rønne can refer to the following:

People

- Arne Falk-Rønne (1920-1992), Danish author and adventurer
- David M. Ronne (1943–2007), American sound engineer and three-time nominee for the Academy Award for Best Sound
- Edith Ronne, American explorer of Antarctica, wife of Finn Ronne
- Finn Ronne (1899–1980), American explorer of Antarctica
- Friedrich Ludwig von Ronne (1798–1865), Prussian jurist, politician, diplomat and German Ambassador to the United States
- Hans Rønne (1887-1951), Danish gymnast
- Henning Rønne (1878-1947), Danish ophthalmologist
- Jackie Ronne (1919-2009), American explorer of Antarctica and first woman in the world to be a working member of an Antarctic expedition
- Martin Rønne (1861–1932), polar explorer
- Veronica Ronne Froman (born 1947), US Navy rear admiral
- Ronne Arnold (1938/39–2020), American-Australian dancer and actor
- Ronne Hartfield (born 1936), American writer and academic
- Ronne Troup (born 1945), American actress

Places

- Rønne, a town and former municipality in Denmark
- Rönne River, Sweden
- Ronne Entrance, a broad southwest entrance of the George VI Sound, named after Finn Ronne
- Mount Ronne, Marie Byrd Land, Antarctica

Other

- Ronne Antarctic Research Expedition, an Antarctica expedition in 1947-1948, led by Finn Ronne

== See also ==
- Ronne-Filchner or Filchner-Ronne Ice Shelf, the second largest ice shelf in Antarctica, named in part after Jackie Ronne
- Rönne (disambiguation)
- Ronnes, a list of people with the surname
