= Werner Mountains =

Group of mountains in Palmer Land, Antarctica

- Location within Antarctica

Geography
- Region(s): Palmer Land, Antarctica
- Range coordinates: 73°34′S 62°20′W

The Werner Mountains (73°34′S 62°20′W) are a group of mountains located just west-southwest of New Bedford Inlet and between the Meinardus Glacier and Bryan Glacier, in Palmer Land, Antarctica.

== Location ==
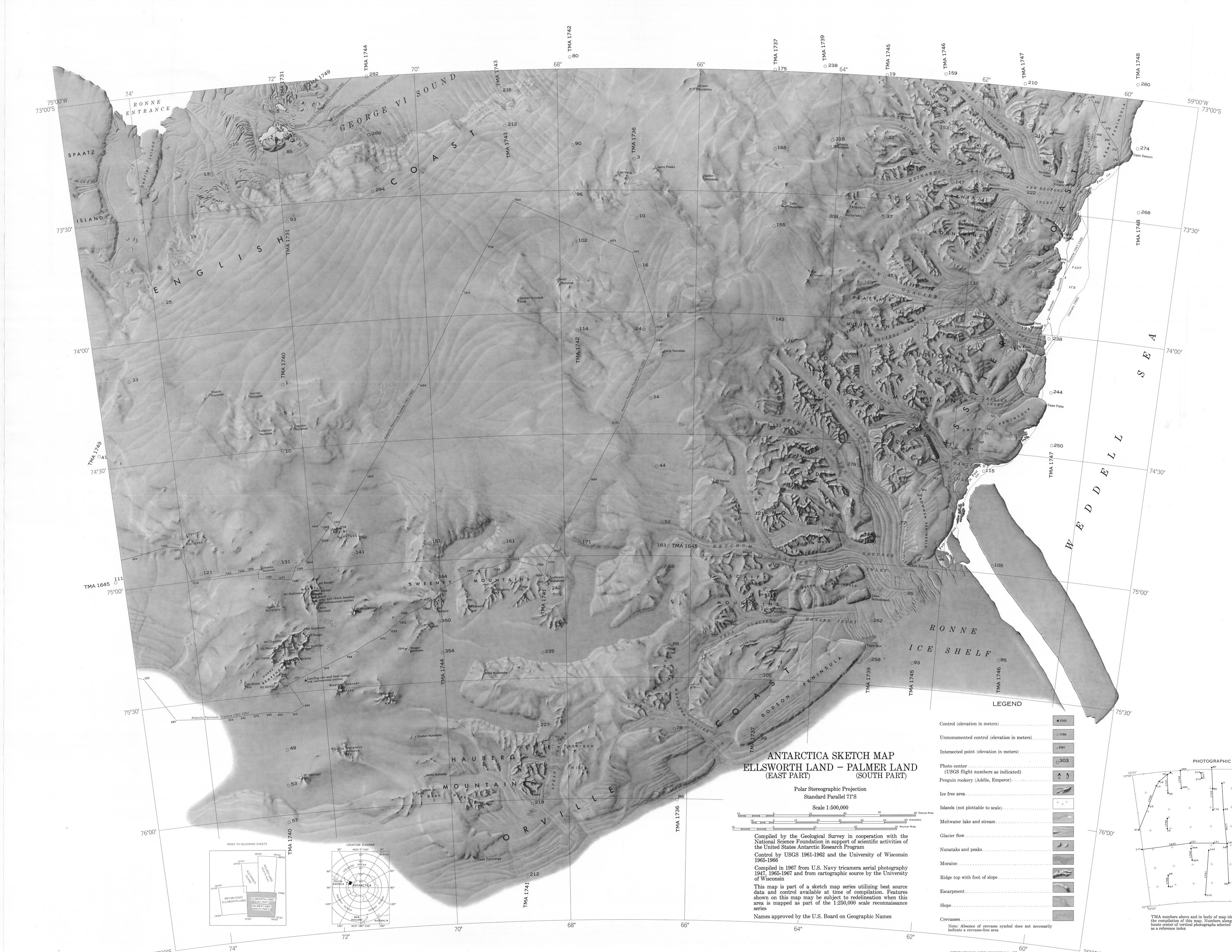
Eastern Ellsworth Land (south), Southern Palmer Land (north). Guettard Range in center east of map.

The Werner Mountains are in southern Palmer Land on the Lassiter Coast of the Weddell Sea. They are northeast of the Playfair Mountains, northwest of Arctowski Peak on the Piggott Peninsula, west of New Bedford Inlet, south of the Dana Mountains. The interior ice plateau to the west is largely featureless apart from isolated nunataks. The Meinardus Glacier defines the north edge of the range, the Bryan Glacier defines the east edge and the Swann Glacier defines the west edge.

== Discovery and name ==
The Werner Mountains were first seen and photographed from the air by the United States Antarctic Service (USAS), 1939–41. They were mapped by the United States Geological Survey (USGS) from surveys and United States Navy air photos, 1961–67. They were named by the United States Advisory Committee on Antarctic Names (US-ACAN) for Abraham Gottlob Werner (1750–1819), German geologist and mineralogist.

== Features ==
Features, from north to south, include Mount Hemmingsen, Mount Fell, Mount Virdin, Douglas Glacier, Mount High and Mount Broome.

=== Mount Hemmingsen ===
73°25′S 61°50′W. A mountain at the northeast end of the Werner Mountains, located on the south side of Meinardus Glacier, 5 nautical miles (9.3 km; 5.8 mi) southwest of Court Nunatak. Mapped by USGS from surveys and United States Navy air photos, 1961-67. Named by US-ACAN for Edvard A. Hemmingsen, biologist at McMurdo Station, summer 1966-67, and Palmer Station, 1967-68.

=== Mount Fell ===
73°26′S 62°16′W. A mountain 8 nautical miles (15 km; 9.2 mi) west of Mount Hemmingsen in the north part of Werner Mountains. Mapped by USGS from ground surveys and United States Navy air photos, 1961-67. Named by US-ACAN for Jack W. Fell, biologist on the Eastwind in the cruise along Antarctic Peninsula in the 1965-66 season.

=== Mount Virdin ===
73°29′S 61°54′W. A mountain 4 nautical miles (7.4 km; 4.6 mi) southwest of Mount Hemmingsen. Mapped by USGS from surveys and United States Navy air photos, 1961-67. Named by US-ACAN for Floyd Virdin, construction mechanic at South Pole Station in 1967.

=== Mount High ===
73°34′S 62°05′W. A mountain on the south side of Douglas Glacier in the central Werner Mountains. Mapped by USGS from surveys and United States Navy air photos, 1961-67. Named by US-ACAN for Harvey W. High, cook with the South Pole Station winter party in 1967.

=== Mount Broome ===
73°35′S 61°45′W. A mountain in the north part of the range which lies between the mouths of Douglas and Bryan Glaciers. Mapped by USGS from ground surveys and United States Navy air photos, 1961-67. Named by US-ACAN for Howard W. Broome, Jr., electrician with the South Pole Station winter party in 1967.

== Nearby features ==
Nearby features to the southwest and west, extending into the interior ice plateau, include from east to west Joughin Glacier, Watson Peaks, Rivera Peaks, Ferguson Nunataks, Toth Nunataks, Galkin Nunatak, Gunn Peaks and Mount Vang.

=== Watson Peaks ===
73°45′S 62°36′W. A linear group of peaks that trend in a northwest–southeast direction for 9 nautical miles (17 km; 10 mi), located 2 nautical miles (3.7 km; 2.3 mi) northeast of Rivera Peaks. Mapped by USGS from surveys and United States Navy air photos, 1961-67. Named by US-ACAN for George E. Watson, biologist on the Palmer Staiion-Eastwind Expedition, summer 1965-66; author of the handbook Birds of the Antarctic and Sub-Antarctic, 1975.

=== Rivera Peaks ===
73°48′S 62°50′W. A wedge-shaped range of peaks, 14 nautical miles (26 km; 16 mi) long, between Swann Glacier and Watson Peaks. Mapped by USGS from surveys and United States Navy air photos, 1961-67. Named by US-ACAN for James P. Rivera, electronics technician at South Pole Station in 1967.

=== Ferguson Nunataks ===
73°33′S 63°48′W. A nunatak group lying between the heads of Meinardus Glacier and Swann Glacier. Mapped by USGS from ground surveys and United States Navy air photos, 1961-67. Named by US-ACAN for Charles L. Ferguson, electrician with the Palmer Station winter party in 1965.

=== Toth Nunataks ===
73°33′S 64°45′W. A small group of isolated nunataks located 17 nautical miles (31 km; 20 mi) north-northwest of Mount Coman. Mapped by USGS from surveys and United States Navy air photos, 1961-67. Named by US-ACAN for Stephen R. Toth, glaciologist at Byrd Station, summer 1965-66.

=== Galkin Nunatak ===
73°27′S 65°55′W. An isolated nunatak about 35 nautical miles (65 km; 40 mi) northwest of Mount Coman, surmounting the interior ice plateau near the base of Palmer Land. Mapped by USGS from ground surveys and United States Navy air photos, 1961-67. Named by US-ACAN for William L. Galkin, meteorologist at Byrd Station, summer 1965-66.

=== Gunn Peaks ===
73°25′S 66°36′W. Isolated peaks 9 nautical miles (17 km; 10 mi) east of Mount Vang in southern Palmer Land. Mapped by USGS from ground surveys and United States Navy air photos, 1961-67. Named by US-ACAN for Robert C. Gunn, glaciologist at Byrd Station, summer 1965-66.

=== Mount Vang ===
73°26′S 67°09′W. An isolated mountain standing southward of George VI Sound and 80 nautical miles (150 km; 92 mi) east-southeast of Eklund Islands in southern Palmer Land. Discovered by Finn Ronne and Carl Eklund of US AS, 1939-41, during their sledge journey through George VI Sound. Resighted from the air on a flight of December 3, 1947 by the RARE under Ronne. Named by Ronne for Knut Vang of Brooklyn, NY, who contributed photographic materials to the RARE 1947-48.

== Sources ==
- Alberts, Fred G., ed. (1995), Geographic Names of the Antarctic (PDF) (2 ed.), United States Board on Geographic Names This article incorporates public domain material from websites or documents of the United States Board on Geographic Names.
- Ellsworth Land - Palmer Land, USGS: United States Geological Survey

This article incorporates public domain material from websites or documents of the United States Geological Survey.
