= Smith Peninsula =

Peninsula of Antarctica

- Location within Antarctica

Geography
- Location: Palmer Land, Antarctica
- Coordinates: 74°23′08″S 60°52′33″W

The Smith Peninsula (74°25′S 61°15′W) is an ice-covered, "dog-legged" peninsula 25 nautical miles (46 km; 29 mi) long and 10 nautical miles (19 km; 12 mi) wide, extending in an easterly direction between Keller Inlet and Nantucket Inlet from the east coast of Palmer Land, Antarctica.

== Location ==
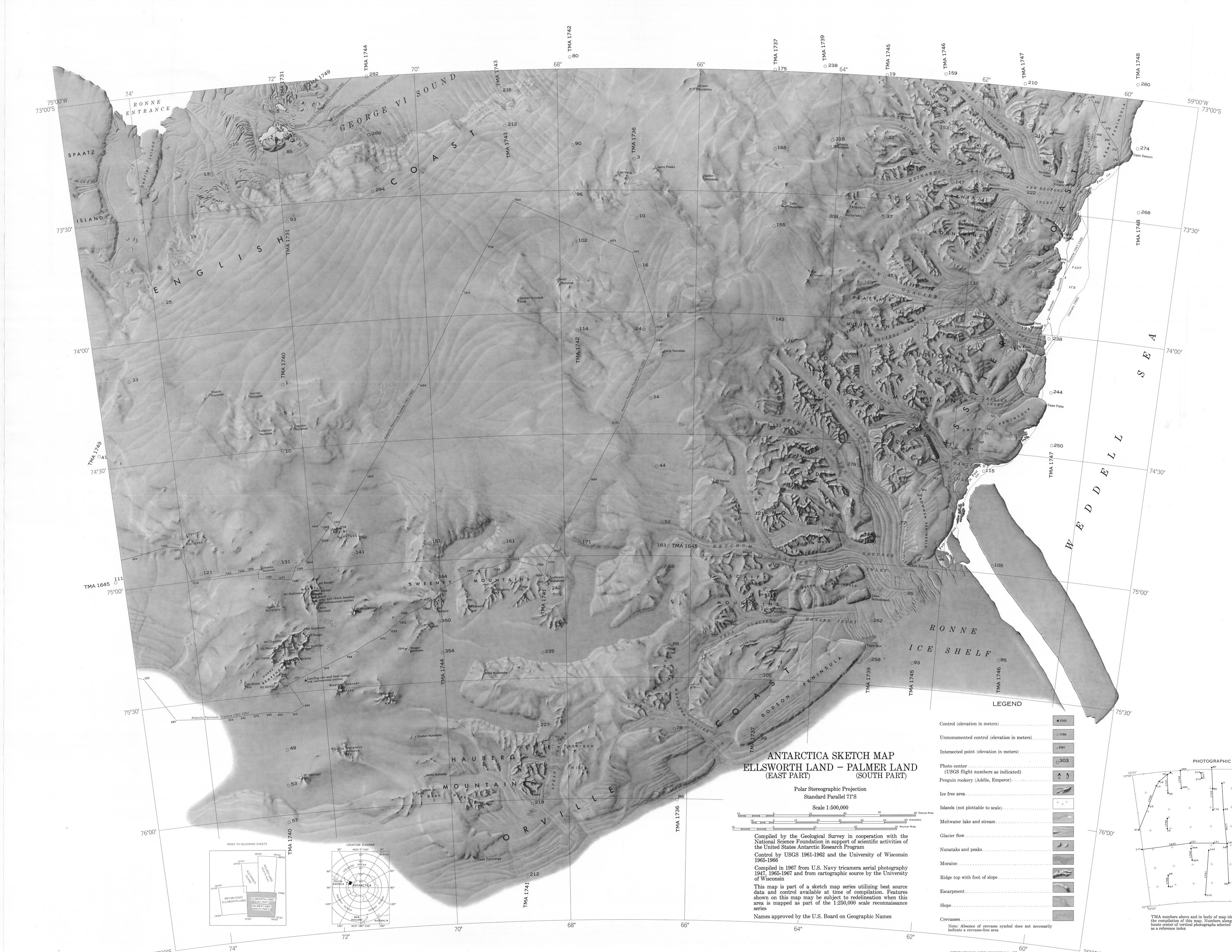
Eastern Ellsworth Land (south), Southern Palmer Land (north). Guettard Range in center east of map.

The Smith Peninsula is in southeast Palmer Land, on the Lassiter Coast of the Weddell Sea. It lies between Nantucket Inlet to the southwest and Keller Inlet to the northeast. Johnston Glacier flows past the west of the peninsula to Nantucket Inlet. Barcus Glacier flows past the north of the peninsula to Keller Inlet. The Hutton Mountains are to the north of the peninsula. Cape Fiske is the easternmost point.

== Discovery and naming ==
The Smith Peninsula was photographed from the air in December 1940 by members of the United States Antarctic Service Expedition (USAS), and in 1947 by members of the Ronne Antarctic Research Expedition (RARE) under Finn Ronne, who in conjunction with the Falkland Islands Dependencies Survey (FIDS) charted it from the ground. It was named by Ronne for Walter Smith, ship's mate, navigator, and trail man with Ronne's expedition.

== Important Bird Area ==
A 292 hectares (720 acres) site on fast ice in the northern part of Clarke Bay has been designated an Important Bird Area (IBA) by BirdLife International because it supports a breeding colony of about 4,000 emperor penguins, estimated from 2009 satellite imagery.

== Features ==
=== Nantucket Inlet ===
74°35′S 61°45′W. An ice-filled inlet 6 nautical miles (11 km; 6.9 mi) wide, which recedes 13 nautical miles (24 km; 15 mi) in a northwest direction between the Smith and Bowman Peninsulas, along the east coast of Palmer Land. Discovered by members of the USAS in a flight from East Base on December 30, 1940, and named for Nantucket Island, MA, home of early New England whalers of the first half of the 19th century.

=== Johnston Glacier ===
74°25′S 62°20′W. A glacier flowing in a southeast direction along the north side of Mount Owen to the head of Nantucket Inlet. Discovered by the RARE, 1947-48, under Ronne, who named it for Freeborn Johnston, of the Dept. of Terrestrial Magnetism at Carnegie Institute, Washington, DC, in recognition of his contributions to the planning of the geophysical program and the working up of the results for the expedition.

=== Keller Inlet ===
74°15′S 61°05′W. An ice-filled inlet 12 nautical miles (22 km; 14 mi) long, in a northeast–southwest direction, and 6 nautical miles (11 km; 6.9 mi) wide, between Cape Little and Cape Fiske, along the east coast of Palmer Land. This inlet was photographed from the air by members of the USAS in December 1940, and in 1947 by members of the RARE under Ronne, who in conjunction with the FIDS charted it from the ground. Named by Ronne for Louis Keller of Beaumont, Texas, who contributed supplies to Ronne's expedition.

=== Barcus Glacier ===
74°15′S 62°00′W. Glacier in the Hutton Mountains that drains east-southeast, to the north of Mount Nash and Mount Light, into Keller Inlet . Mapped by the United States Geological Survey (USGS) from ground surveys and United States Navy air photos, 1961-67. Named by the United States Advisory Committee on Antarctic Names (US-ACAN) for James R. Barcus, ionospheric physics researcher at Byrd Station in the summers 1966-67 and 1967-68.

=== Cape Fiske ===
74°21′S 60°27′W. A cape which forms the east tip of Smith Peninsula. This cape was photographed from the air by members of the USAS in December 1940, and in 1947 by members of the RARE under Ronne, who in conjunction with the FIDS charted it from the ground. Named by Ronne for C.O. Fiske climatologist with the Ronne expedition.

== Sources ==
- Alberts, Fred G., ed. (1995), Geographic Names of the Antarctic (PDF) (2 ed.), United States Board on Geographic Names This article incorporates public domain material from websites or documents of the United States Board on Geographic Names.
- "Smith Peninsula", BirdLife Data Zone, BirdLife International, 2015
- Ellsworth Land - Palmer Land, USGS: United States Geological Survey

This article incorporates public domain material from websites or documents of the United States Geological Survey.
