= Playfair Mountains =

Group of mountains in Palmer Land, Antarctica

- Location within Antarctica

Geography
- Region(s): Palmer Land, Antarctica
- Range coordinates: 73°55′S 63°25′W

The Playfair Mountains (73°55′S 63°25′W) are a group of mountains between Swann Glacier and Squires Glacier in southeast Palmer Land, Antarctica.

== Location ==
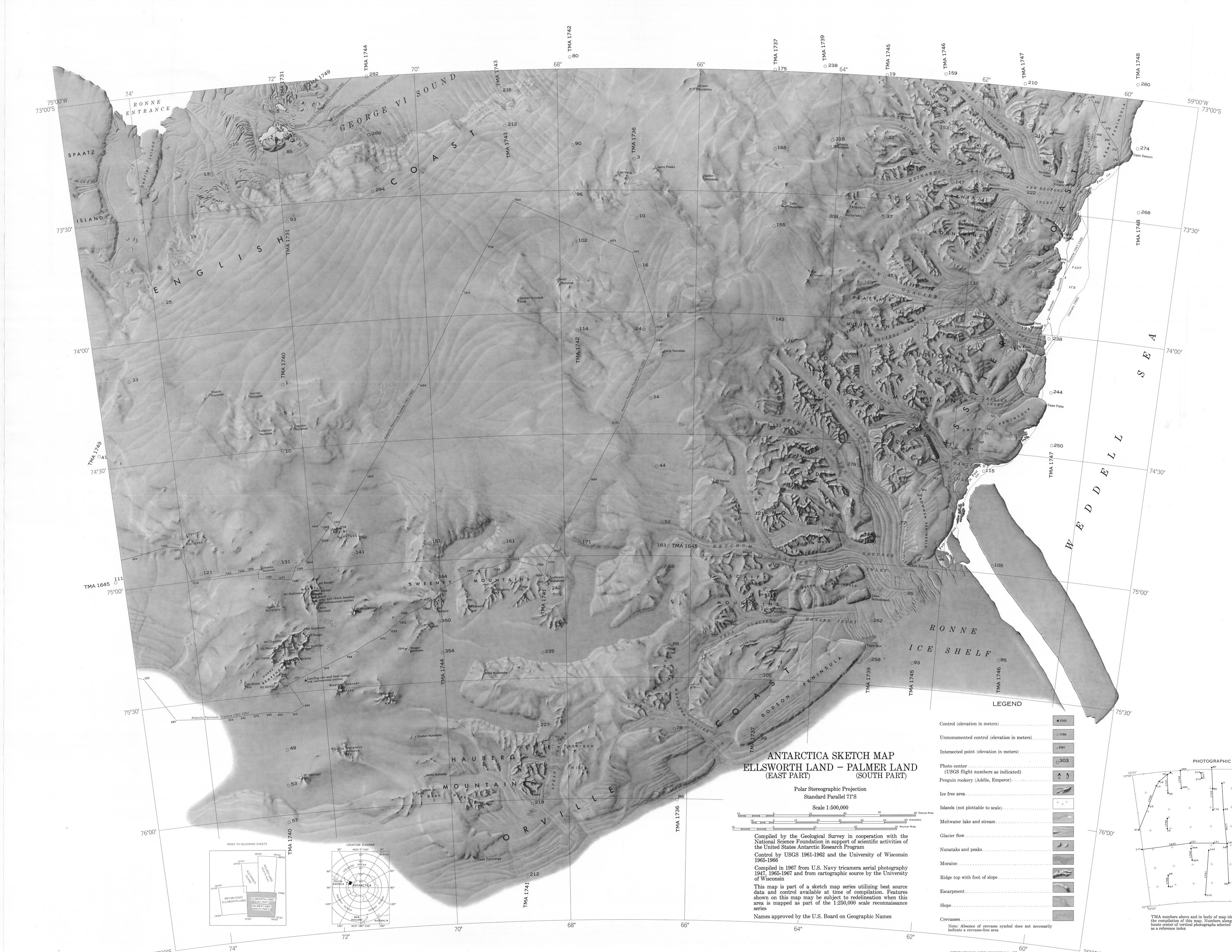
Eastern Ellsworth Land (south), Southern Palmer Land (north). Guettard Range in center east of map.

The Playfair Mountains are in southern Palmer Land on the Lassiter Coast of the Weddell Sea. They lie between the Swann Glacier to the north and the Squires Glacier to the south, which converge to the east of the Playfair Mountains and flow into Wright Inlet on the coast. The Guettard Range is to the southwest, the Hutton Mountains to the southeast, the Werner Mountains to the northeast. The interior ice plateau to the west is mostly featureless, with a few isolated nunataks. Features include Mount Coman, Mount Kapi and Squires Peak. Features to the west include Lang Nunatak, Gomez Nunatak and Savin Nunatak.

== Discovery and name ==
The Playfair Mountains were first seen and photographed from the air by the United States Antarctic Service (USAS), 1939–41. They were mapped by the United States Geological Survey (USGS) from surveys and United States Navy air photographs, 1961–67. They were named by the United States Advisory Committee on Antarctic Names (US-ACAN) for John Playfair (1748–1819), Scottish mathematician and geologist.

== Features ==
Features and nearby features include:

=== Mount Coman ===
73°49′S 64°18′W. A prominent isolated mountain which rises above the ice-covered plateau of Palmer Land, located just westward of the Playfair Mountains. Discovered by the Ronne Antarctic Research Expedition (RARE), 1947–48, under Finn Ronne, who named this mountain for Doctor F. Dana Coman, physician with the Byrd Antarctic Expedition (ByrdAE) of 1928–30.

=== Mount Kane ===
73°58′S 62°59′W. A mountain standing 6 nautical miles (11 km; 6.9 mi) west-southwest of Squires Peak in the Playfair Mountains. Mapped by USGS from surveys and United States Navy air photos, 1961–67. Named by US-ACAN for Alan F. Kane, construction mechanic with the South Pole Station winter party in 1964.

=== Squires Peak ===
73°56′S 62°39′W. A peak marking the eastern extremity of the Playfair Mountains. Mapped by USGS from surveys and United States Navy air photos, 1961–67. Named by US-ACAN for Donald F. Squires, biologist, member of the Palmer Station–Eastwind Expedition, summer 1965–66.

=== Lang Nunatak ===
74°10′S 66°29′W. An isolated nunatak lying in the interior of southern Palmer Land, about 30 nautical miles (56 km; 35 mi) west of the head of Irvine Glacier. Mapped by USGS from surveys and United States Navy air photos, 1961–67. Named by US-ACAN for James F. Lang, USARP Assistant Representative at Byrd Station, summer 1965–66.

=== Gomez Nunatak ===
73°57′S 68°38′W. An isolated nunatak 40 nautical miles (74 km; 46 mi) southwest of Mount Vang, surmounting the interior ice plateau near the base of Antarctic Peninsula. Mapped by USGS from ground surveys and United States Navy air photos, 1961–67. Named by US-ACAN for Jose M. Gomez, mechanic with the Eights Station winter party in 1965.

=== Savin Nunatak ===
73°52′S 68°02′W. An isolated nunatak 30 nautical miles (56 km; 35 mi) southwest of Mount Vang, rising above the ice plateau at the base of Palmer Land. Mapped by USGS from surveys and United States Navy air photos, 1961–67. Named by US-ACAN for Samuel M. Savin, glaciologist at Byrd Station, summer 1965–66.

== Sources ==
- Alberts, Fred G., ed. (1995), Geographic Names of the Antarctic (PDF) (2 ed.), United States Board on Geographic Names This article incorporates public domain material from websites or documents of the United States Board on Geographic Names.
- Ellsworth Land - Palmer Land, USGS: United States Geological Survey

This article incorporates public domain material from websites or documents of the United States Geological Survey.
