= Wright Inlet =

Body of water in Palmer Land, Antarctica

- Location within Antarctica
- Location: Orville Coast, Antarctica
- Coordinates: 73°57′S 61°26′W
- Type: Inlet
- Ocean/sea sources: Weddell Sea

Wright Inlet (73°57′S 61°26′W) is an ice-filled inlet receding westward between Cape Little and Cape Wheeler along the east coast of Palmer Land, Antarctica.

== Location ==
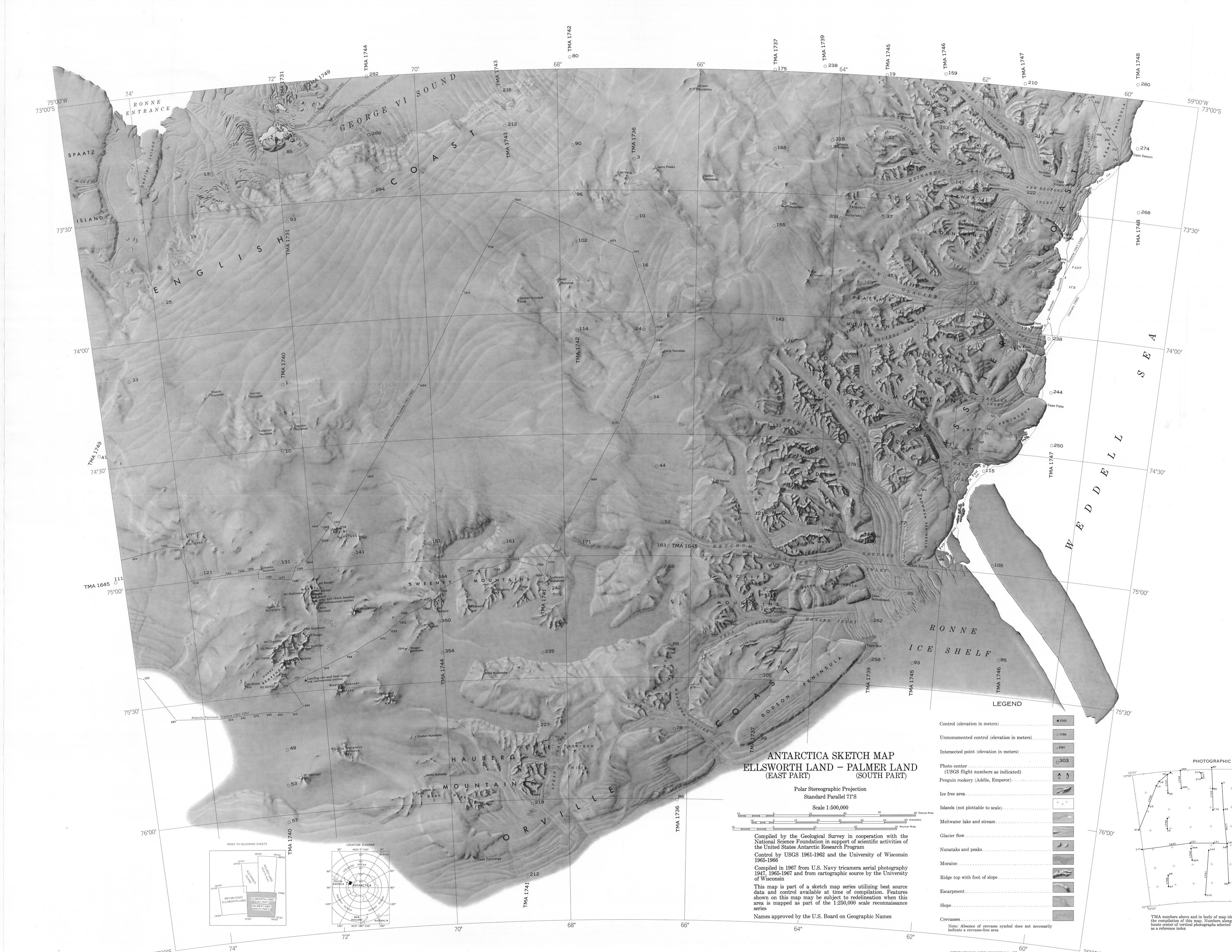
Eastern Ellsworth Land (south), Southern Palmer Land (north). Gardner Inlet in center east of map.

Wright Inlet is on the Lassiter Coast of southern Palmer Land, opening onto the Weddell Sea to the east. The Hutton Mountains are to the southwest, the Playfair Mountains to the west and the Werner Mountains are to the northwest. It is north of Keller Inlet and south of Howkins Inlet. Piggott Peninsula lies on the north side of the inlet. Cape Wheeler to the north and Cape Little to the south define the mouth of the inlet. The inlet is fed by the Waverley Glacier, which enters from the east. Further inland it is fed from the west by Squires Glacier and Swann Glacier.

== Discovery and name ==
Wright Inlet inlet was photographed from the air in 1940 by the United States Antarctic Service (USAS) and in 1947 by the Ronne Antarctic Research Expedition (RARE) under Finn Ronne. It was named by Ronne for John Kirtland Wright, Director of the American Geographical Society, which lent its auspices to Ronne's expedition.

== Features ==
=== Cape Wheeler ===
73°58′S 61°05′W. An abrupt rock scarp rising to 460 metres (1,510 ft). It forms the north side of the entrance to Wright Inlet. The cape was photographed from the air in 1940 by the USAS and in 1947 by the RARE under Ronne. Named by Ronne for John Neville Wheeler, president of the North American Newspaper Alliance and a contributor to the expedition.

=== Cape Little ===
74°05′S 61°04′W. Cape at the east extremity of the peninsula between Wright INlet and Keller Inlet, on the east coast of Palmer Land. Probably seen from the air by members of the USAS who photographed Wright Inlet in December 1940. Photographed from the air during 1947 by the RARE under Ronne, who in conjunction with the FIDS charted it from the ground. Named by Ronne for Delbert M. Little, Assistant Chief for Operations, United States Weather Bureau, who arranged the program for sending weather reports from the RARE.

=== Waverley Glacier ===
74°01′S 61°38′W. Narrow glacier flowing along the south flank of Mount Tricorn and entering Wright Inlet. This glacier was photographed from the air by members of the USAS in December 1940, and by the RARE under Ronne in 1947. Named by Ronne after Waverly, New York, home of the Kasco Mills. Mr. Marc Ivy and Mr. Edwin Knapp, officers of the Kasco Mills, contributed twenty tons of dog food to Ronne's expedition.

=== Squires Glacier ===
73°58′S 62°35′W. A tributary glacier between the Playfair and Hutton Mountains, flowing east-northeast to Swann Glacier. Mapped by USGS from surveys and United States Navy air photos, 1961-67. Named by US-ACAN for Peter L. Squires, glaciologist at Byrd Station, summer 1965-66.

=== Swann Glacier ===
73°53′S 61°48′W. Broad glacier of undetermined length flowing east into Wright Inlet to the north of Mount Tricorn. The glacier was discovered and photographed from the air in December 1940 by members of East Base of the USAS. During 1947 it was photographed from the air by members of the RARE, under Ronne, who in conjunction with the FIDS charted it from the ground. Named by Ronne for W.F.G. Swann, Director of the Barthol Research Foundation of Franklin Inst. at Swarthmore, PA, a contributor to the expedition.

=== Joughin Glacier ===
73.7666667°S 62.4°W. A glacier east of Watson Peaks, flowing southeast into Wright Inlet. Named by US-ACAN (2008) after Ian Joughin, electrical engineer, who pioneered the use of interferometric synthetic aperture radar to estimate surface motion and topography of ice sheets both in Antarctica and Greenland. He has used remote sensing, field work, and modeling to study ice dynamics since the early 1990s.

== Sources ==
- Alberts, Fred G., ed. (1995), Geographic Names of the Antarctic (PDF) (2 ed.), United States Board on Geographic Names This article incorporates public domain material from websites or documents of the United States Board on Geographic Names.
- Ellsworth Land - Palmer Land, USGS: United States Geological Survey
- "Joughin Glacier", Geographic Names Information System, United States Geological Survey, United States Department of the Interior

This article incorporates public domain material from websites or documents of the United States Geological Survey.
