= New Bedford Inlet =

Body of water in Palmer Land, Antarctica

- Location within Antarctica
- Location: Lassiter Coast, Antarctica
- Coordinates: 73°22′S 61°15′W
- Type: Inlet
- Ocean/sea sources: Weddell Sea

New Bedford Inlet (73°22′S 61°15′W) is a large pouch-shaped, ice-filled embayment between Cape Kidson and Cape Brooks, along the east coast of Palmer Land, Antarctica.

== Location ==
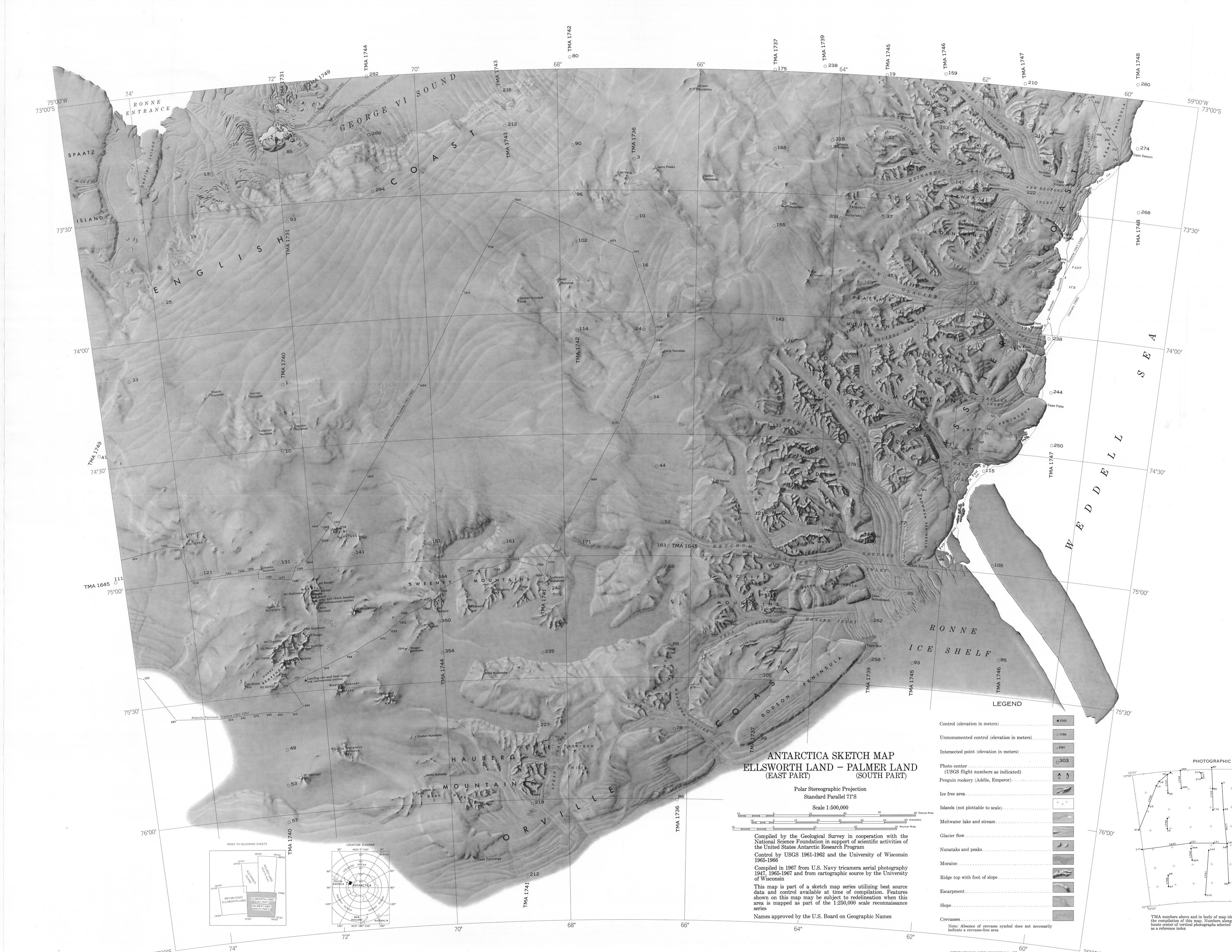
Eastern Ellsworth Land (south), Southern Palmer Land (north). Gardner Inlet in center east of map.

New Bedford Inlet is on the Lassiter Coast of southern Palmer Land, opening onto the Weddell Sea to the east. It is north of Piggott Peninsula and Howkins Inlet and south of Mossman Inlet. The Warner Mountains are to the southwest and the Dana Mountains to the northwest. Several glaciers drain into the inlet. Clockwise from the south they include Wells Glacier, Bryan Glacier, Douglas Glacier, Meinardus Glacier with its left tributary Haines Glacier, and Mosby Glacier with its left tributary Fenton Glacier. The mouth of the inlet lies between Cape Brooks to the south and Cape Kidson to the north. Simpson Head is just west of Cape Kidson.

== Discovery and name ==
New Bedford Inlet was discovered and photographed from the air in December 1940 by members of the United States Antarctic Service (USAS), and named after New Bedford, Massachusetts, the centre of the New England whaling industry in the middle of the 19th century.

== Glaciers ==
=== Wells Glacier ===
73°32′S 61°11′W. A glacier 9 nautical miles (17 km; 10 mi) west of Cape Brooks, flowing north into New Bedford Inlet. Mapped by the United States Geological Survey (USGS) from ground surveys and United States Navy air photos, 1961-67. Named by the United States Advisory Committee on Antarctic Names (US-ACAN) for James T. Wells, storekeeper with the South Pole Station winter party in 1967.

=== Bryan Glacier ===
73°30′S 61°33′W. A glacier that flows north along the east side of the Werner Mountains and merges with Douglas Glacier on entering New Bedford Inlet. Mapped by USGS from ground surveys and United States Navy air photos, 1961-67. Named by US-ACAN for Terry E. Bryan, glaciologist at Byrd Station, summer 1966-67.

=== Douglas Glacier ===
73°31′S 61°45′W. Glacier that flows east-northeast through the central Werner Mountains. The glacier merges with Bryan Glacier just north of Mount Broome where it enters New Bedford Inlet. Mapped by USGS from ground surveys and United States Navy air photos, 1961-67. Named by US-ACAN for Everett L. Douglas, biologist at Palmer Station, summer 1967-68.

=== Meinardus Glacier ===
73°22′S 61°55′W. An extensive glacier flowing in an east-northeast direction to a point immediately east of Mount Barkow, where it is joined from the northwest by Haines Glacier, and then east to enter New Bedford Inlet close west of Court Nunatak. Discovered and photographed from the air in December 1940 by the USAS. During 1947 it was photographed from the air by the Ronne Antarctic Research Expedition (RARE) under Finn Ronne, who in conjunction with the Falkland Islands Dependencies Survey (FIDS) charted it from the ground. Named by the FIDS for Wilhelm Meinardus, German meteorologist and climatologist and author of many publications including the meteorological results of the GerAE under Drygalski, 1901-03.

=== Haines Glacier ===
73°21′S 62°33′W. A glacier 4 nautical miles (7.4 km; 4.6 mi) wide, flowing in a southeast direction and joining Meinardus Glacier immediately east of Mount Barkow. Discovered and photographed from the air in December 1940 by the US AS. During 1947 the glacier was photographed from the air by the RARE, who in conjunction with the FIDS charted it from the ground. Named by the FIDS for William C. Haines, American meteorologist and member of the Byrd Antarctic Expeditions of 1928-30 and 1933-35, and joint author of the meteorological reports of these two expeditions.

=== Mosby Glacier ===
73°09′S 61°40′W. A glacier 5 nautical miles (9.3 km; 5.8 mi) wide at its mouth, flowing in a southeast direction to the northwest corner of New Bedford Inlet. Discovered and photographed from the air in December 1940 by the US AS. During 1947 it was photographed from the air by the RARE under Finn Ronne, who in conjunction with the FIDS mapped its terminus from the ground. Named by the FIDS for Hakon Mosby, Norwegian meteorologist and oceanographer.

=== Fenton Glacier ===
73°03′S 61°48′W. A glacier that drains south into Mosby Glacier just east of Mount Adkins. Mapped by USGS from ground surveys and United States Navy air photos, 1961-67. Named by US-ACAN for Lieutenant (j.g.) Ernest R. Fenton, United States Navy, Officer-in-Charge of Palmer Station in 1971.

== Other features ==
=== Cape Brooks ===
73°36′S 60°46′W. A cape marked by steep, conspicuous walls which rise to 465 metres (1,526 ft) high, forming the south side of the entrance to New Bedford Inlet. Discovered and photographed from the air in December 1940 by members of the US AS. During 1947 the cape was photographed from the air by members of the RARE, who in conjunction with the FIDS charted it from the ground. Named by the FIDS for Charles E.P. Brooks, English meteorologist on the staff of the Meteorological Office, 1907-49.

=== Cape Kidson ===
73°24′S 60°45′W. An abrupt rock scarp which rises to 300 metres (980 ft) high, forming the north side of the entrance to New Bedford Inlet. First sighted and photographed from the air by members of the USAS in 1940. During 1947 the cape was photographed from the air by the RARE, who in conjunction with the FIDS charted it from the ground. Named by the FIDS for Edward Kidson, New Zealand meteorologist and author of the meteorological reports of the British Antarctic Expedition, 1907–09 (BrAE) under Shackleton, and the AAE under Mawson, 1911-14.

=== Simpson Head ===
73°21′S 60°59′W. A conspicuous promontory rising to 1,065 metres (3,494 ft). It projects south into the north side of New Bedford Inlet 4 nautical miles (7.4 km; 4.6 mi) northwest of Cape Kidson. Discovered and photographed from the air in December 1940 by members of the US AS. During 1947 it was photographed from the air by members of the RARE, who in conjunction with the FIDS charted it from the ground. Named by the FIDS for Sir George C. Simpson.

== Sources ==
- Alberts, Fred G., ed. (1995), Geographic Names of the Antarctic (PDF) (2 ed.), United States Board on Geographic Names This article incorporates public domain material from websites or documents of the United States Board on Geographic Names.
- Ellsworth Land - Palmer Land, USGS: United States Geological Survey

This article incorporates public domain material from websites or documents of the United States Geological Survey.
