= Dana Mountains =

Group of mountains in Palmer Land, Antarctica

- Location within Antarctica

Geography
- Region(s): Palmer Land, Antarctica
- Range coordinates: 73°12′S 62°25′W

The Dana Mountains (73°12′S 62°25′W) are a group of mountains just northwest of New Bedford Inlet, bounded by Mosby Glacier on the north and Haines Glacier and Meinardus Glacier on the south, in Palmer Land, Antarctica.

== Location ==
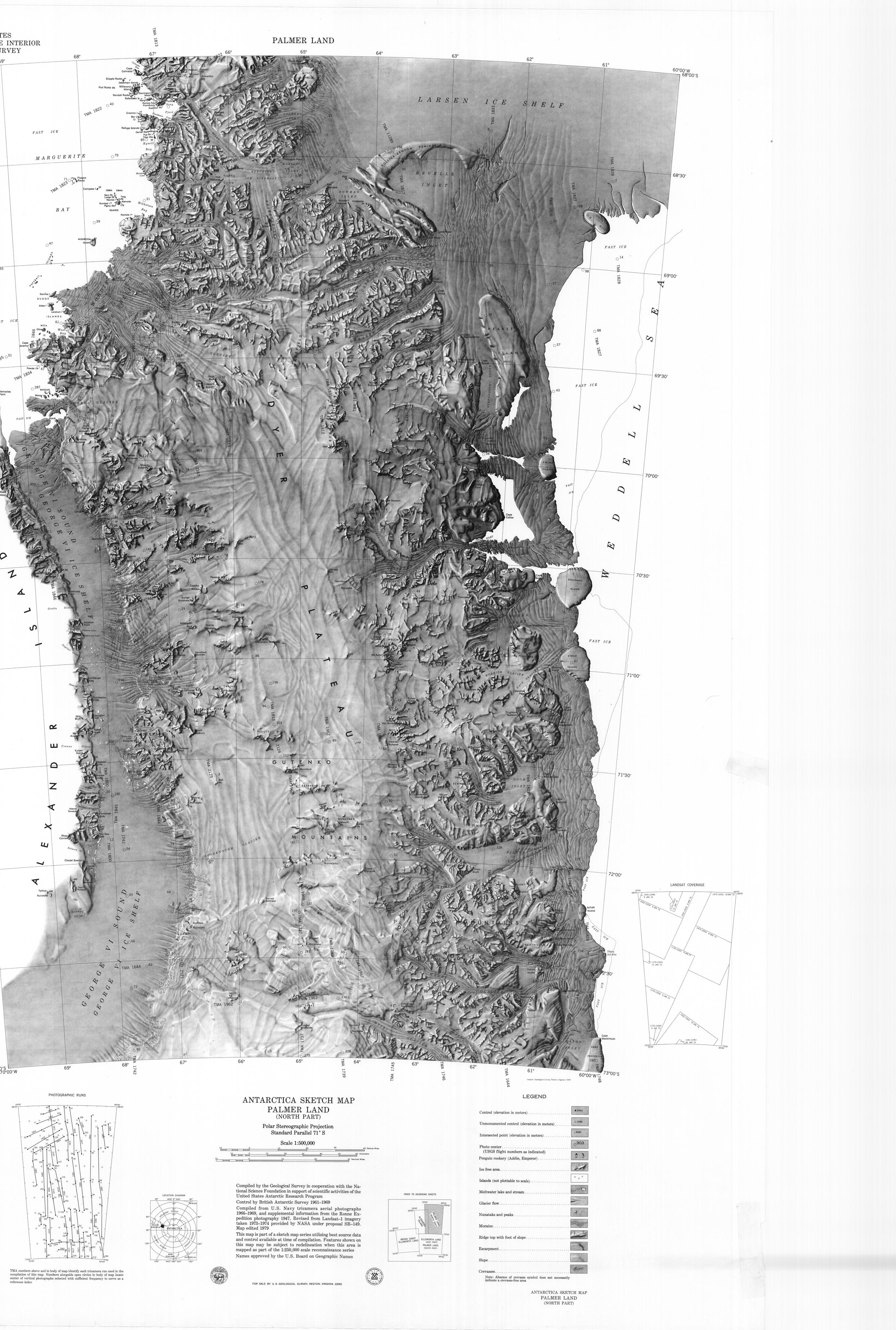
Palmer Land. North tip of Dana Mountains in southeast of map

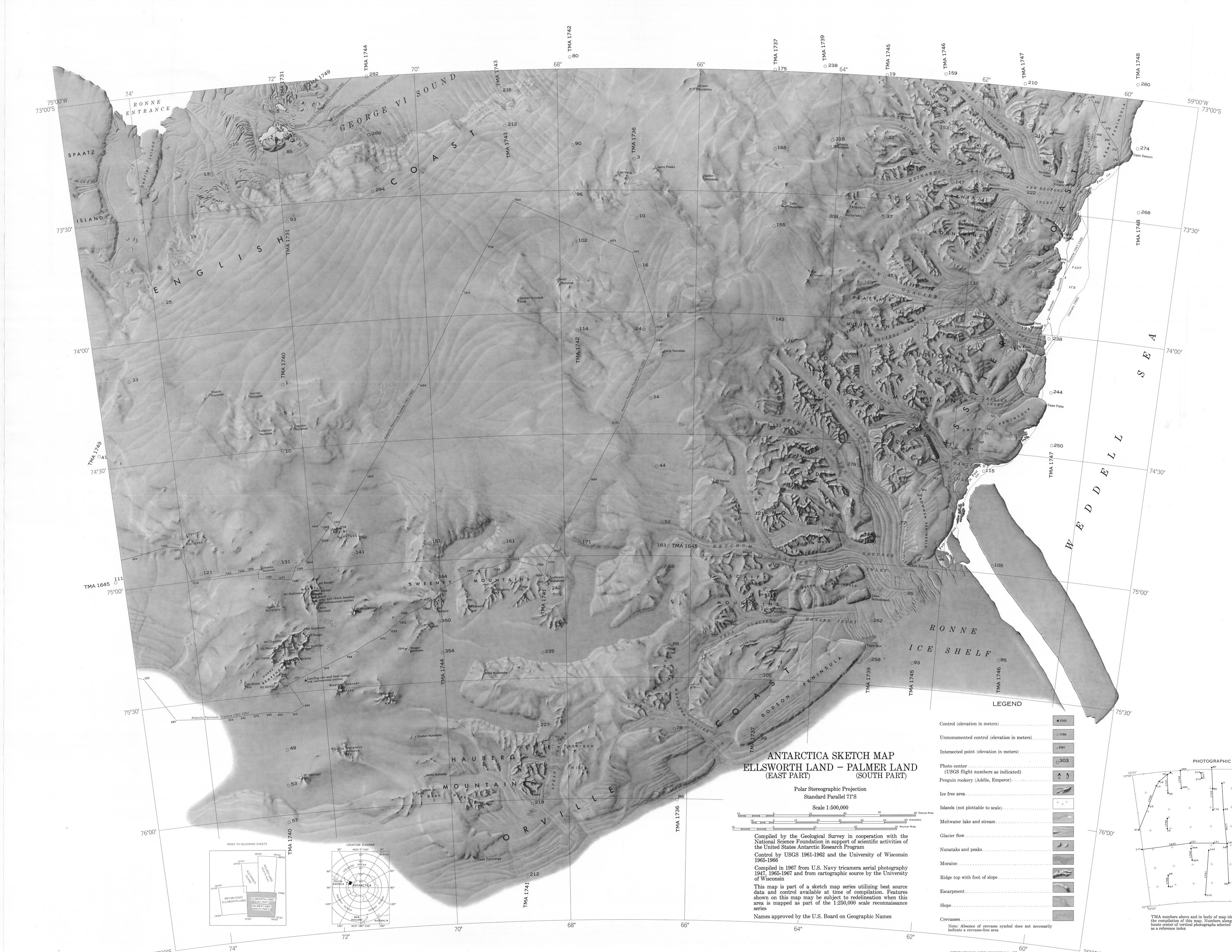
Eastern Ellsworth Land (south), Southern Palmer Land (north). Dana Mountains in northeast of map.

The Dana Mountains are in southern Palmer Land on the Lassiter Coast of the Weddell Sea. They are south of the Carey Range. They are north of the Werner Mountains and northwest of New Bedford Inlet. They run from northwest to southeast between Mosby Glacier to the northeast, Haines Glacier and Meinardus Glacier to the southwest. The Mosby Glacier and Meinardus Glacier converge and enter New Bedford Inlet. To the west the ice plateau has few features apart from isolated nunataks. Features of the Dana Mountains include, from northwest to southeast, Mount Axworthy, Walsh Nunatak, Galan Ridge, Dillon Peak, Mount Grimminger, Mount Cummings and Court Nunatak. Nearby features to the west include Gordon Nunataks, Holden Nunataks, Mount Heer, Mount Barkow, Schoofs Nunatak and Jensen Nunataks.

== Discovery and name ==
The Dana Mountains were first seen and photographed from the air by the United States Antarctic Service (USAS) 1939–41. They were mapped by the United States Geological Survey (USGS) from surveys and from United States Navy air photographs, 1961–67. They were named by the United States Advisory Committee on Antarctic Names (US-ACAN) after James Dwight Dana (1813-95), an American geologist.

== Features ==
=== Mount Axworthy ===
73°06′S 62°44′W. A mountain in the northwest part of the Dana Mountains. Mapped by USGS from ground surveys and United States Navy air photos, 1961-67. Named by US-ACAN for Charles S. Axworthy, a hospital corpsman and leader of the support personnel with the Palmer Station winter party in 1965.

=== Walsh Nunatak ===
73°09′S 63°11′W. A nunatak on the north side of Haines Glacier, 8 nautical miles (15 km; 9.2 mi) southwest of Mount Axworthy, in the Dana Mountains. Mapped by USGS from surveys and United States Navy air photos, 1961-67. Named by US-ACAN for John J. Walsh, biologist, member of the Palmer Station-Eastwind Expedition, summer 1965-66.

=== Galan Ridge ===
73°10′S 62°00′W. A prominent ridge which forms the northeast rampart of the Dana Mountains. Mapped by USGS from ground surveys and United States Navy air photos, 1961-67. Named by US-ACAN for Michael P. Galan, a member of the McMurdo Station winter party in 1967 and of the South Pole-Queen Maud Land Traverse III in 1967-68.

=== Dillon Peak ===
73°17′S 62°40′W. Peak in the Dana Mountains surmounting the north side of the terminus of Haines Glacier. Mapped by USGS from ground surveys and United States Navy air photos, 1961-67. Named by US-ACAN for Raymond D. Dillon, biologist at McMurdo Station and Palmer Station during the 1966-67 and 1967-68 seasons.

=== Mount Grimminger ===
73°18′S 62°18′W. Cone-shaped, mostly ice-covered mountain, 1,680 metres (5,510 ft) high, standing on the north side of Meinardus Glacier, close east of its juncture with Haines Glacier. Discovered and photographed from the air in December 1940 by the USAS. During 1947 it was photographed from the air by the Ronne Antarctic Research Expedition (RARE) under Finn Ronne, who in conjunction with the Falkland Islands Dependencies Survey (FIDS) charted it from the ground. Named by the FIDS for George Grimminger, American meteorologist and joint author of the meteorological reports of the Byrd Antarctic Expedition (ByrdAE), 1928-30, and the ByrdAE, 1933-35, and a member of the latter expedition.

=== Mount Cummings ===
73°14′S 61°37′W. Mountain at the east end of Galan Ridge in the Dana Mountains. First mapped by the joint RARE-FIDS party, 1947-48. Mapped in greater detail by USGS from ground surveys and United States Navy air photos, 1961-67. Named by US-ACAN for Jack W. Cummings, radioman with the Palmer Station winter party in 1965.

=== Court Nunatak ===
73°22′S 61°36′W. Nunatak 3 nautical miles (5.6 km; 3.5 mi) long which rises to 685 metres (2,247 ft) high, standing close east of the mouth of Meinardus Glacier on the west side of New Bedford Inlet. Discovered and photographed from the air in December 1940 by members of East Base of the US AS. During 1947 it was photographed from the air by members of the RARE, who in conjunction with the FIDS charted it from the ground. Named by the FIDS for Arnold Court, American meteorologist and member of the West Base unit of the US AS, 1939-41.

== Nearby features ==
=== Gordon Nunataks ===
72°53′S 63°48′W. A group of nunataks on the south side of Mosby Glacier, near its head. Mapped by the USGS from aerial photographs taken by the United States Navy, 1966-69. In association with the names of Antarctic oceanographers grouped in this area, named in 1977 by the UK-APC after Arnold L. Gordon, American oceanographer; Professor of Geology, Lament-Doherty Geological Observatory, Columbia University, New York.

=== Holden Nunataks ===
72°51′S 65°00′W. A group of about four nunataks rising to 1,500 metres (4,900 ft) near the head of Mosby Glacier, to the south of Journal Peaks in south-central Palmer Land. Mapped by USGS from aerial photographs taken by the United States Navy, 1966-69. Surveyed by BAS, 1974-75. Named by the UK Antarctic Place-Names Committee (UK-APC) after Godfrey A. Holden, BAS general assistant who took part in the survey; later, Station Commander, Rothera, 1977-78.

=== Mount Heer ===
73°18′S 62°58′W. Mountain on the south side of Haines Glacier, 3 nautical miles (5.6 km; 3.5 mi) north of Mount Barkow. Mapped by USGS from surveys and United States Navy air photos, 1961-67. Named by US-ACAN for Ray R. Heer, Jr., Program Director (Atmospheric Physics), Office of Antarctic Programs, National Science Foundation.

=== Mount Barkow ===
73°22′S 62°48′W. Mountain, 1,390 metres (4,560 ft) high, which stands 20 nautical miles (37 km; 23 mi) west of Court Nunatak and New Bedford Inlet and marks the east end of the ridge separating Haines and Meinardus Glaciers. Discovered and photographed from the air in December 1940 by the US AS. Photographed from the air by RARE under Ronne, who in conjunction with the FIDS mapped it from the ground in 1947. Named by the FIDS for Erich Barkow, German meteorologist and member of the GerAE, 1911-12, under Filchner.

=== Schoofs Nunatak ===
73°18′S 64°04′W. An isolated nunatak 20 nautical miles (37 km; 23 mi) west-northwest of Mount Barkow, rising above the featureless ice plateau westward of the heads of Meinardus Glacier and Haines Glacier. Mapped by USGS from surveys and United States Navy air photos, 1961-67. Named by US-ACAN for Gerald J. Schoofs, radioscience researcher at Byrd Station, summer 1965-66.

=== Jensen Nunataks ===
73°04′S 66°05′W. A cluster of isolated nunataks in the interior of southern Palmer Land, about 28 nautical miles (52 km; 32 mi) northeast of Mount Vang. Mapped by USGS from surveys and United States Navy air photos, 1961-67. Named by US-ACAN for Curtis M. Jensen, glaciologist at Byrd Station, summer 1965-66.

== Sources ==
- Alberts, Fred G., ed. (1995), Geographic Names of the Antarctic (PDF) (2 ed.), United States Board on Geographic Names This article incorporates public domain material from websites or documents of the United States Board on Geographic Names.
- Ellsworth Land - Palmer Land, USGS: United States Geological Survey
- Palmer Land, USGS: United States Geological Survey

This article incorporates public domain material from websites or documents of the United States Geological Survey.
