= Edith Ronne Land =

Unofficial name of a region of Antarctica

Coordinates: 78°30′S 61°00′W

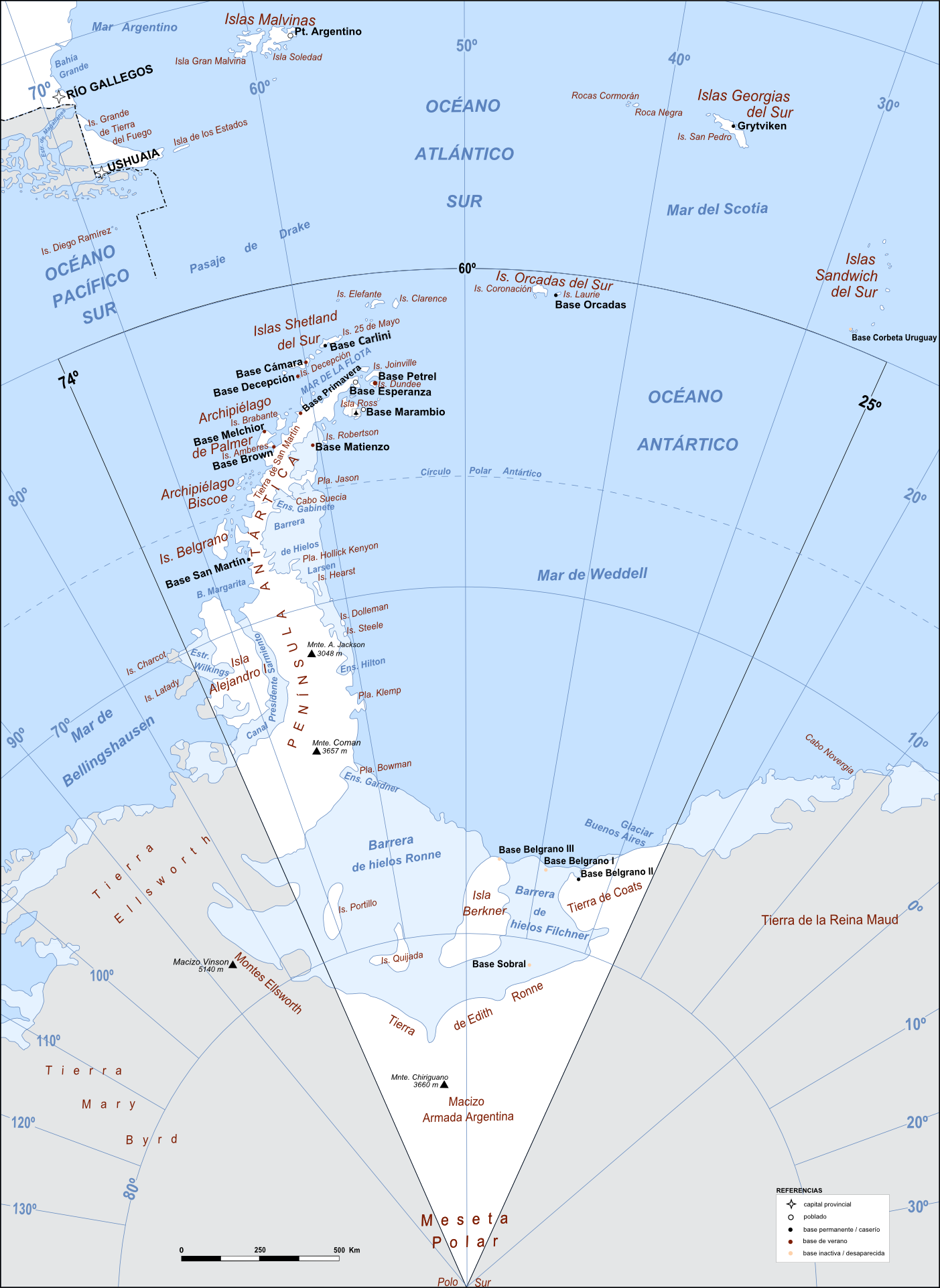
Map of Edith Ronne Land

Edith Ronne Land was the unofficial name of that portion of Antarctica which is bordered by Palmer Land and Ellsworth Land to the West, Coats Land to the East, and the Filchner-Ronne Ice Shelf to the North. In December 2012, this region was officially named Queen Elizabeth Land by the British Government, which considers it part of the British Antarctic Territory.

Edith Ronne Land was named by Chile for Edith Ronne, who was the first woman to be a full member of an Antarctic team. She was also the wife of Commander Finn Ronne, from the United States Navy Reserve, who was the leader of the Ronne Antarctic Research Expedition (RARE) in 1947–48.

== Past name usage ==
Originally, the name was given in 1947 by Commander Finn Ronne to the land presumed to lie south of the large ice shelf he discovered at the head of Weddell Sea (which corresponds to most of present-day Queen Elizabeth Land). However, it was determined in 1957–58 that the ice shelf was larger than previously charted, extending southwards to preempt most of "Edith Ronne Land," and the US Advisory Committee on Antarctic Names officially approved in 1968 the name "Ronne Ice Shelf" for that large ice shelf instead (excluding Filchner Ice Shelf that lies between Berkner Island and Coats Land).
