= Rönne =

Rönne may refer to:

- Rönne, Swedish and German name of Rønne
- Alexis von Roenne, a German officer
- Carl Ewald von Rönne, a German-born Russian cavalry officer
- Rönne (river), river in Germany

== See also ==
- Ronne (disambiguation)
