= Guettard Range =

Mountain range in Palmer Land, Antarctica

- Location within Antarctica

Highest point
- Coordinates: 74°21′S 63°27′W

Geography
- Region(s): Palmer Land, Antarctica

The Guettard Range (74°21′S 63°27′W) is a mountain range, 40 nautical miles (74 km; 46 mi) long and 10 nautical miles (19 km; 12 mi) wide, located northwest of Bowman Peninsula and between Johnston Glacier and Irvine Glacier, in the southeastern extremity of Palmer Land, Antarctica.

== Location ==
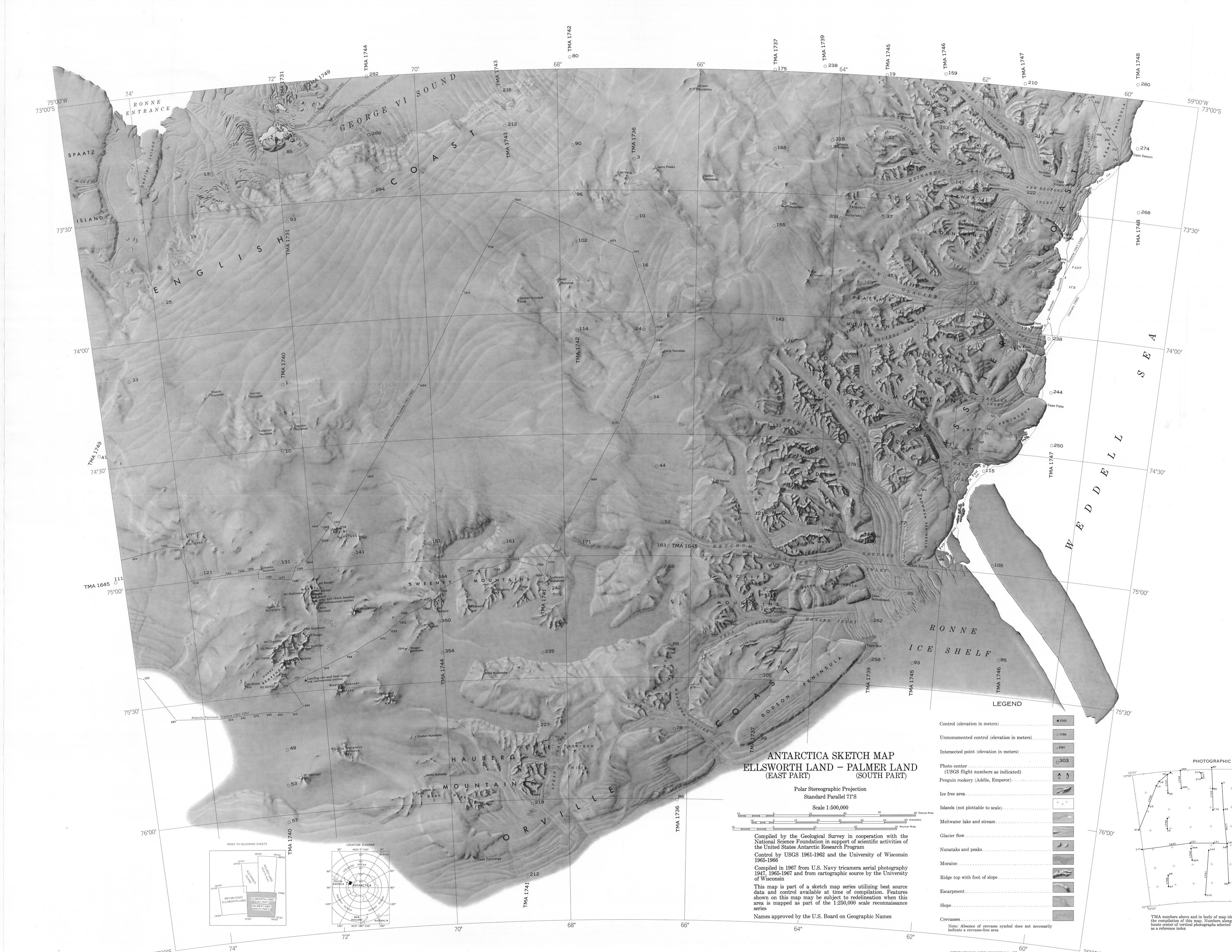
Eastern Ellsworth Land (south), Southern Palmer Land (north). Guettard Range in center east of map.

The Guettard Range is in southeast Palmer Land, in the base of the Antarctic Peninsula. It runs in a south-southeast direction between the Irvine Glacier to the west and the Johnston Glacier to the east. It terminates in the Bowman Peninsula between Gardner Inlet and Nantucket Inlet on the Lassiter Coast of the Weddell Sea. The Latady Mountains are west of the Irvine Glacier, and the Hutton Mountains are east of the Johnson Glacier. The Playfair Mountains are to the northeast. A largely featureless ice field is to the northwest. Features of the range, from north to south, include Mount Laudon, Johnston Spur, Mount Owen, Kelsey Cliff, Mount Lampert and Mount Mull.

== Exploration and name ==
The Guettard Range was photographed from the air by the Ronne Antarctic Research Expedition (RARE), 1947–48. It was mapped from United States Geological Survey (USGS) surveys and United States Navy air photographs, 1961–67, and was named by the United States Advisory Committee on Antarctic Names (US-ACAN) for French naturalist and geologist Jean-Étienne Guettard, 1715-86.

== Features ==
=== Mount Laudon ===
74°13′S 64°03′W. A prominent mountain standing 7 nautical miles (13 km; 8.1 mi) north of Mount Crowell in the northwest part of Guettard Range. Mapped by USGS from surveys and United States Navy air photos, 1961-67. Named by US-ACAN for Thomas S. Laudon, geologist at Byrd Station, summer 1960-61, and member of the University of Wisconsin geological party to the Eights Station area, summer 1965-66.

=== Johnston Spur ===
74°23′S 63°02′W. A spur in the central part of the Guettard Range, extending eastward to the flank of Johnston Glacier. Mapped by USGS from surveys and United States Navy air photos, 1961-67. Named by US-ACAN for Thomas M. Johnston, equipment operator with the South Pole Station winter party in 1965.

=== Mount Owen ===
74°25′S 62°30′W. A mountain, 1,105 metres (3,625 ft) high, standing 2 nautical miles (3.7 km; 2.3 mi) northwest of Kelsey Cliff at the south side of Johnston Glacier. This mountain was photographed from the air in December 1940 by the USAS, and in 1947 by the RARE under Ronne, who in conjunction with the FIDS charted it from the ground. Named by Ronne for Arthur Owen, trail man with the RARE.

=== Kelsey Cliff ===
74°30′S 62°18′W. A prominent cliff standing close southeast of Mount Owen in the east end of the Guettard Range. First mapped by the RARE-FIDS joint sledge party in 1947-48. Named for Lawrence D. Kelsey, radio operator with the RARE, 1947-48.

=== Mount Lampert ===
74°33′S 62°39′W. Mountain about 6 nautical miles (11 km; 6.9 mi) west of Kelsey Cliff in the southeast part of Guettard Range. Mapped by USGS from surveys and United States Navy air photos, 1961-67. Named by US-ACAN for Irwin R. Lampert, storekeeper at South Pole Station in 1964.

=== Mount Mull ===
74°33′S 63°08′W. A mountain on the east flank of Irvine Glacier, standing 11 nautical miles (20 km; 13 mi) southwest of Mount Owen. Mapped by USGS from surveys and United States Navy air photos, 1961-67. Named by US-ACAN for William B. Mull, cook at South Pole Station in 1964

== Sources ==
- Alberts, Fred G., ed. (1995), Geographic Names of the Antarctic (PDF) (2 ed.), United States Board on Geographic Names This article incorporates public domain material from websites or documents of the United States Board on Geographic Names.
- Ellsworth Land - Palmer Land, USGS: United States Geological Survey

This article incorporates public domain material from websites or documents of the United States Geological Survey.
