= Hutton Mountains =

Group of mountains in Palmer Land, Antarctica

- Location within Antarctica

Highest point
- Coordinates: 74°12′S 62°20′W

Geography
- Region(s): Palmer Land, Antarctica

The Hutton Mountains (74°12′S 62°20′W) are a group of mountains in southeast Palmer Land, Antarctica, bounded on the southwest by Johnston Glacier, on the northwest by Squires Glacier, on the north by Swann Glacier, and on the east by Keller Inlet.

== Location ==
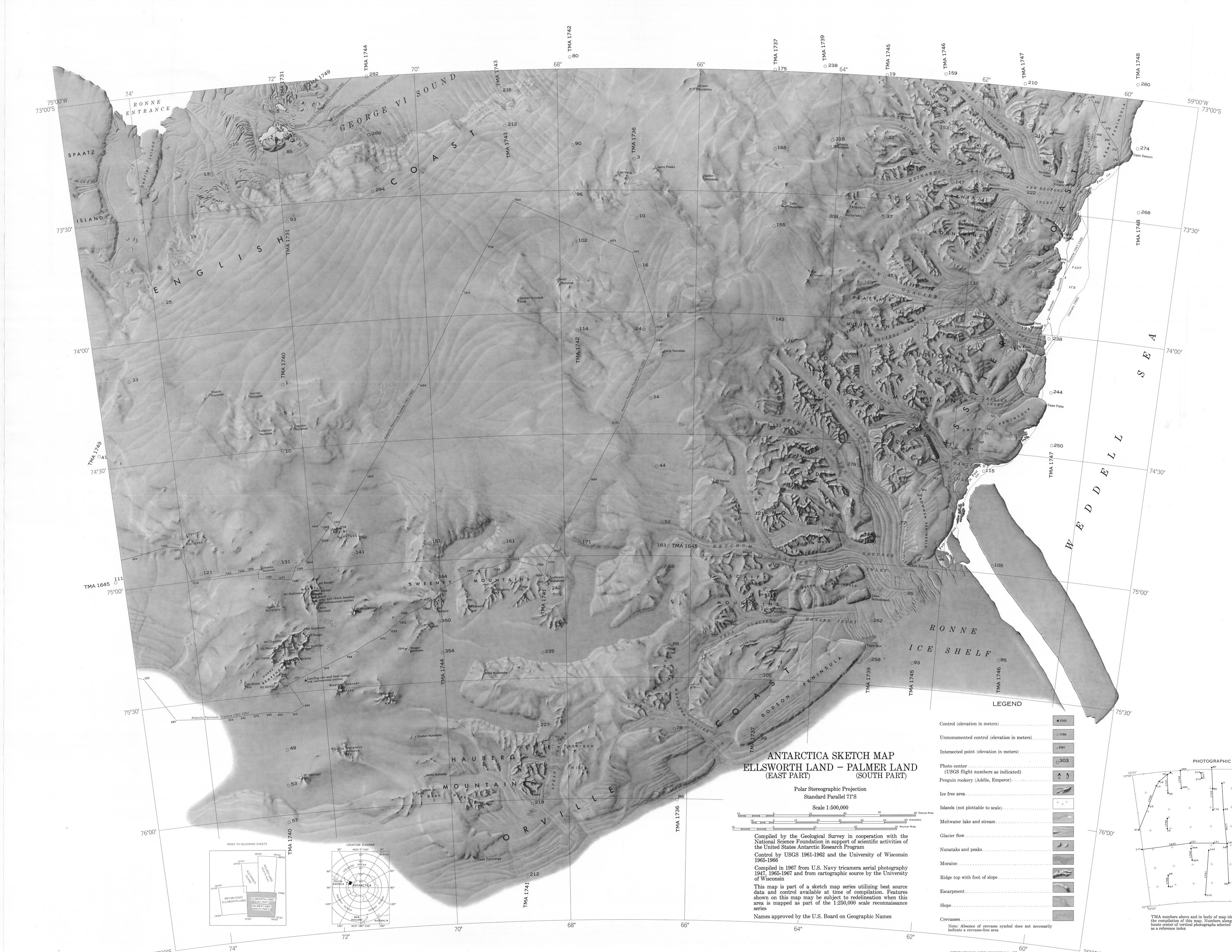
Eastern Ellsworth Land (south), Southern Palmer Land (north). Guettard Range in center east of map.

The Hutton Mountains are in southeast Palmer Land on the Lassiter Coast of the Weddell Sea. The Guettard Range is to the southwest, the Playfair Mountains to the northwest, Wright Inlet to the northeast and the Smith Peninsula to the southeast. The Hutton Mountains are bounded by the Johnston Glacier to the southwest, Squires Glacier to he northwest, Wright Inlet to the northeast. Features, from north to south, include Mount Tricorn, Mount Gorham, Waverly Glacier, Mount McElroy, Barcus Glacier, Mount Nash, Mount Light and Mount Rath.

== Discovery and name ==
The Hutton Mountains were observed and photographed from the air by the Ronne Antarctic Research Expedition (RARE), 1947–48. They were mapped by the United States Geological Survey (USGS) from surveys and United States Navy air photographs, 1961–67. They were named by the United States Advisory Committee on Antarctic Names (US-ACAN) after James Hutton (1726-97), a Scottish geologist.

== Features ==
=== Mount Tricorn ===
73°58′S 61°45′W. A distinctive massif whose vertical rock faces rise to 1,120 metres (3,670 ft) high and surrounds a snow-covered interior which is lower except for a 1,610 metres (5,280 ft) high peak in the northwest portion, standing at the head of Wright Inlet. Discovered by members of the USAS in a flight from East Base on December 30, 1940, and named for its resemblance to a gigantic tri-cornered hat.

=== Mount Gorham ===
74°03′S 62°04′W. Mountain just southwest of Mount Tricorn. Mapped by USGS from ground surveys and United States Navy air photos, 1961-67. Named by US-ACAN after Charles E. Gorham, builder with the South Pole Station winter party in 1967.

=== Mount McElroy ===
74°09′S 63°12′W. Prominent mountain at the west end of the Hutton Mountains. Discovered by the RARE, 1947-48, led by Ronne, who named the mountain for T.P. McElroy, of Boston, who contributed the radio and communication instruments for the expedition.

=== Farman Highland ===
74°08′S 61°30′W. A relatively smooth ice-covered upland, rising to about 750 metres (2,460 ft) high and forming the east part of Hutton Mountains, between Wright Inlet and Keller Inlet. The feature was mapped by USGS from surveys and United States Navy aerial photographs, 1961-67. Named by UK-APC in 1991 after Joseph C. Farman, FIDS-BAS atmospheric physicist, 1957-90; scientific officer, Argentine Islands, 1957-59 (Base Leader, 1958-59).

=== Mount Nash ===
74°14′S 62°20′W. A mountain, 1,295 metres (4,249 ft) high, standing 13 nautical miles (24 km; 15 mi) west-northwest of the head of Keller Inlet and 12 nautical miles (22 km; 14 mi) north-northeast of Mount Owen. Discovered by the RARE, 1947-48, under Ronne, who named it for H.R. Nash, of Pittsburgh, PA, a contributor to the expedition.

=== Mount Light ===
74°16′S 61°59′W. A mountain along the south side of Barcus Glacier, 6 nautical miles (11 km; 6.9 mi) east-southeast of Mount Nash. Mapped by the RARE and FIDS (Falkland Islands Dependencies Survey) joint sledge party of 1947-48. Named by Finn Ronne for Richard Upjohn Light, then President of the American Geographical Society. The RARE had applied the name "Cape Light" to part of the extremity of Smith Peninsula, but that name is now dropped as Cape Fiske provides adequate reference to that feature.

=== Mount Rath ===
74°19′S 62°30′W. A mountain 6 nautical miles (11 km; 6.9 mi) north-northeast of Mount Owen. Mapped by USGS from surveys and United States Navy air photos, 1961-67. Named by US-ACAN for Arthur E. Rath, electronics technician at South Pole Station in 1964.

== Sources ==
- Alberts, Fred G., ed. (1995), Geographic Names of the Antarctic (PDF) (2 ed.), United States Board on Geographic Names This article incorporates public domain material from websites or documents of the United States Board on Geographic Names.
- Ellsworth Land - Palmer Land, USGS: United States Geological Survey

This article incorporates public domain material from websites or documents of the United States Geological Survey.
