= Queen Elizabeth Land =

Place in Antarctica

- Map of Queen Elizabeth Land (purple)

- Location of Queen Elizabeth Land in Antarctica
- Coordinates: 84°S 49°W
- Named for: Elizabeth II
- Continent: Antarctica

Area
  - Total: 437,000 km^{2} (169,000 sq mi)

Queen Elizabeth Land is a portion of mainland Antarctica named by the government of the United Kingdom and claimed as part of the British Antarctic Territory. Situated south of Weddell Sea and between longitudes 20°W and 80°W, stretching from Filchner-Ronne Ice Shelf to the South Pole. It is bordered by Zumberge Coast of Ellsworth Land to the West and by Hercules Inlet to the Northwest. To the Northeast, circle of latitude 82°S is the dividing line against Coats Land. The area of Queen Elizabeth Land was unnamed until 2012, though most of it was unofficially known as Edith Ronne Land in 1947–68 and includes areas claimed by the United Kingdom, Chile and Argentina.

== History ==
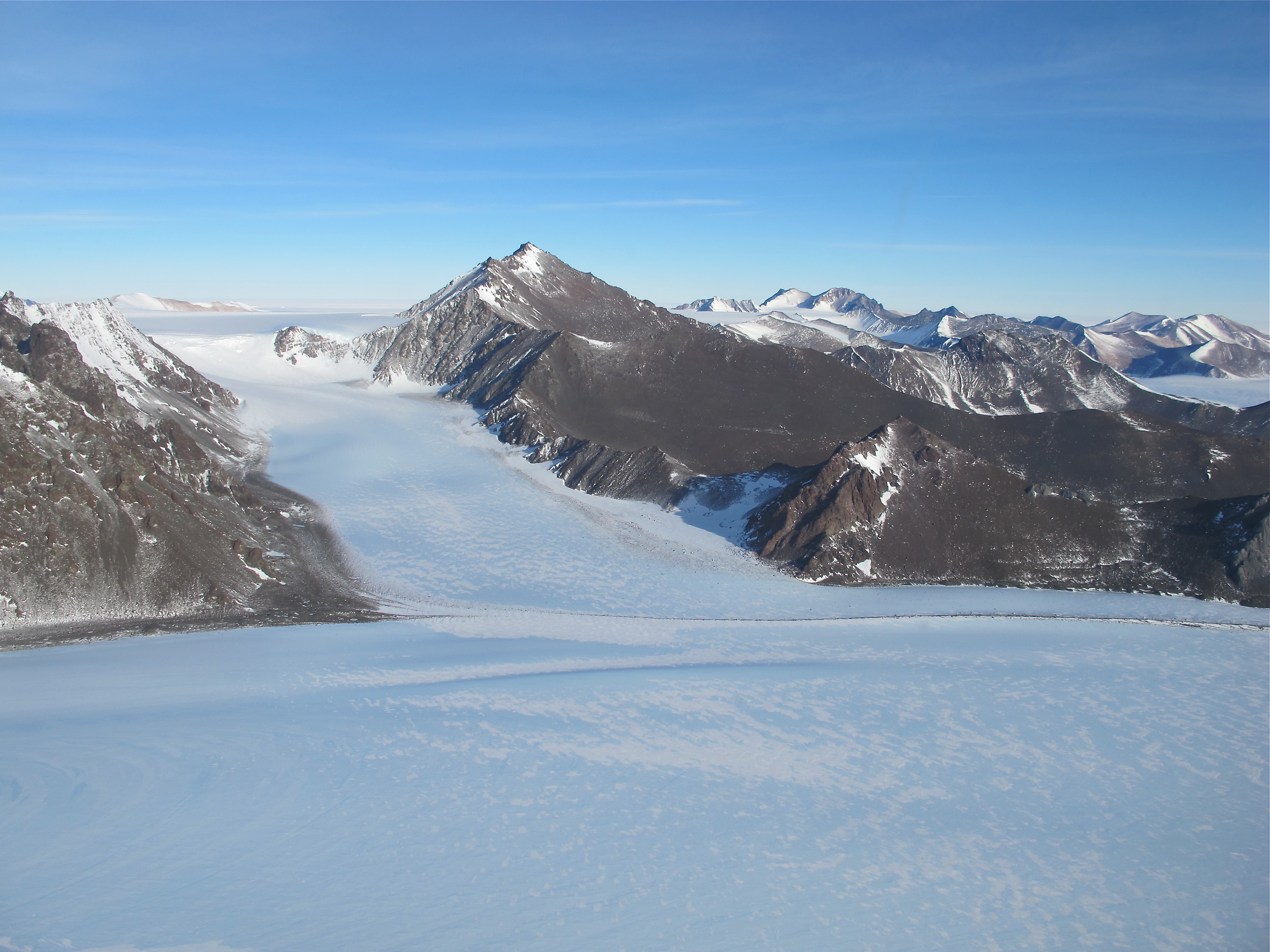
The glacier flowing from the Pensacola Mountains onto the Filchner–Ronne Ice Shelf

On the occasion of a visit by Queen Elizabeth II to the British Foreign and Commonwealth Office in London on 18 December 2012, it was announced there that a 437,000-square-kilometre (169,000 sq mi) area of the British Antarctic Territory had been named Queen Elizabeth Land after The Queen. The Secretary of State for Foreign and Commonwealth Affairs, William Hague, said that the naming was "a fitting tribute at the end of Her Majesty's Diamond Jubilee year".

Queen Elizabeth Land is nearly twice the size of the United Kingdom and is essentially a triangular segment of Antarctica, with one vertex at the South Pole. It is bordered on the North side by the Filchner–Ronne Ice Shelf, to the Northeast by Coats Land, to the East by Queen Maud Land, and extends in the West to a line between the South Pole and Rutford Ice Stream, east of Constellation Inlet. The Pensacola Mountains, discovered in January 1956, run for some 450 km (280 mi) along a north-east to south-west line along the centre of the territory. The area's name will be included on all British maps.

Queen Elizabeth Land is the second region of Antarctica to be named in honour of Queen Elizabeth II. The first is Princess Elizabeth Land, located across the continent in the Australian Antarctic Territory, which was named in 1931 in honour of then-Princess Elizabeth during the reign of her grandfather George V as the King of Australia.

=== Reactions to the naming ===
Argentina, whose Argentine Antarctica claim overlaps with the British Antarctic Territory, criticised the naming calling it a "systematic attack" and described it as "provocation" after recent tensions over Argentina's claim to the sovereignty of the Falkland Islands, a British Overseas Territory.

The Russian Ministry of Foreign Affairs issued a statement regarding the naming, where they reminded that Russia was one of the original parties to the Antarctic Treaty signed in 1959 and calling for the full, unconditional and responsible compliance by all State parties with its provisions (which included the UK). According to the Antarctic Treaty, "no acts or activities taking place while the present Treaty is in force shall constitute a basis for asserting, supporting or denying a claim to territorial in Antarctica and do not create any rights of sovereignty in Antarctica".

== See also ==
- Princess Elizabeth Land
- Queen Elizabeth Islands
