= Jackie Ronne =

American explorer (1919–2009)

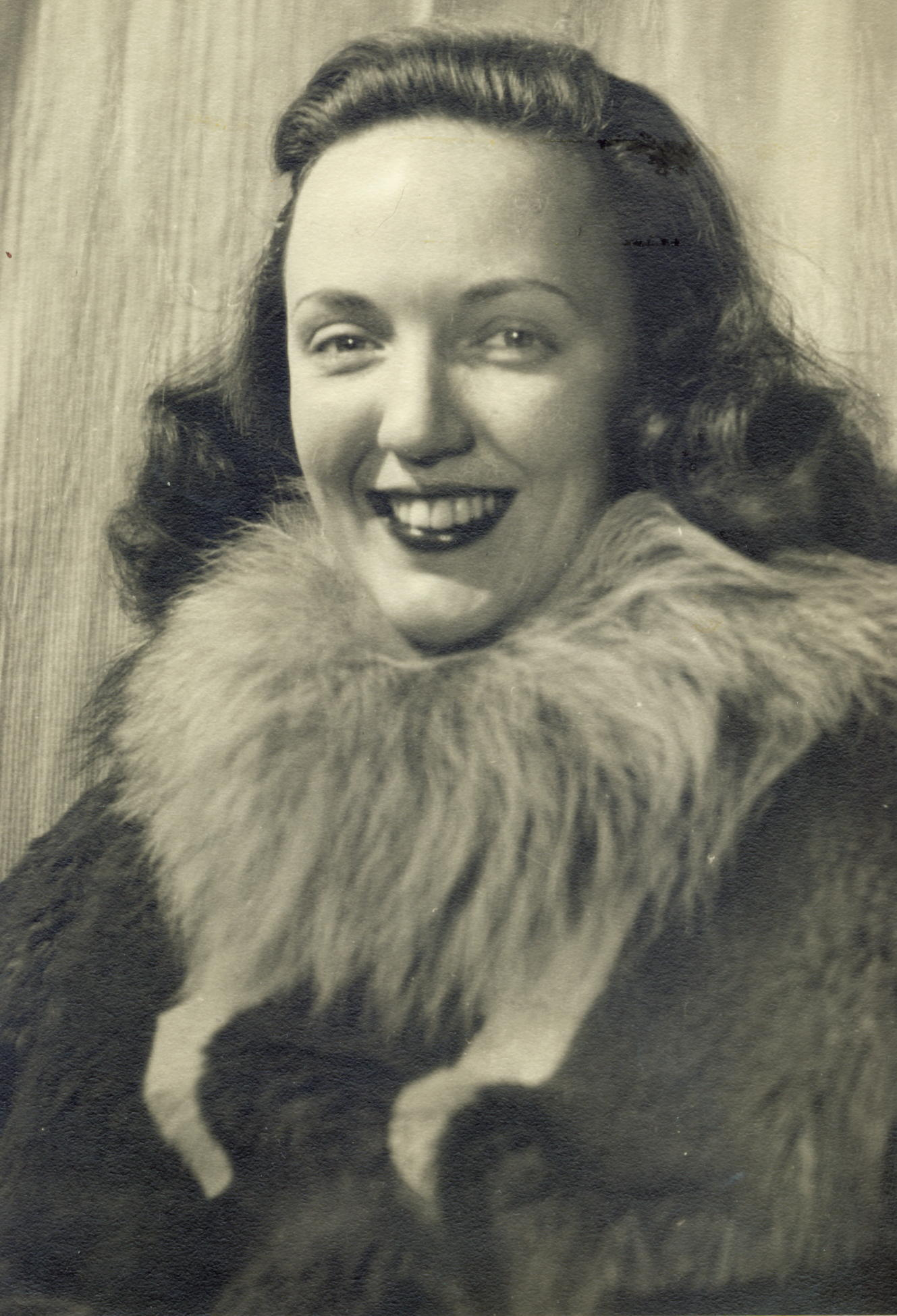
- Ronne in 1947
- Born: Edith Ann Maslin; October 13, 1919; Baltimore, Maryland, U.S.
- Died: June 14, 2009 (aged 89); Bethesda, Maryland, U.S.
- Education: George Washington University
- Known for: Antarctic expedition and Ronne ice shelf
- Spouse: Finn Ronne (m. 1941; died 1980)

Edith Jackie Ronne (October 13, 1919 – June 14, 2009) was an American explorer of Antarctica and the first woman in the world to be a working member of an Antarctic expedition (1947–48). The Ronne Ice Shelf was named by her husband after her.

== Biography ==
Born Edith Ann Maslin on October 13, 1919, in Baltimore, Maryland, Ronne spent her first two years in college at the College of Wooster in Wooster, Ohio, and received a degree in history from George Washington University, where she was a member of Phi Mu sorority. After college she worked in the U.S. State Department where she spent five years serving in several different positions from file clerk to International Information Specialist in the Near and Far Eastern Division of Cultural Affairs. She married Finn Ronne on March 18, 1941, and on the expedition of 1946–1948 that her husband commanded, she became the first American woman to set foot on the Antarctic continent. She and Jennie Darlington, the wife of the expedition's chief pilot, became the first women to overwinter in Antarctica. They spent 15 months together with 21 other members of the expedition in a small station they had set up.

As the expedition's recorder and historian, Ronne wrote the news releases for the North American Newspaper Alliance. She also kept a daily history of the expedition's accomplishments, which formed the basis for her husband's book, Antarctic Conquest, published by Putnam in 1949, as well as making routine tidal and seismographic observations.

Edith Ronne returned fifteen times to Antarctica, including a Navy-sponsored flight to the South Pole in 1971 to commemorate the 60th anniversary of Roald Amundsen first reaching the South Pole, and a 1995 trip back to her former base at Stonington Island as guest lecturer on the expedition cruise ship Explorer. She was a fellow of The Explorers Club and served as president of the Society of Woman Geographers from 1978 to 1981.

She died on June 14, 2009, aged 89, from Alzheimer's disease.

== Legacy ==
Edith Ronne Land was named after her by her husband (Commander Finn Ronne), who mapped the last unknown coastline on earth. When the territory was determined to be mostly ice shelf, the name was changed to Edith Ronne Ice Shelf. At her request, the U.S. Board on Geographic Names removed her first name, so that the Ronne Ice Shelf would correspond to the continent's other large ice shelf, the Ross Ice Shelf and to commemorate all three Ronne explorers including her father-in-law, Martin Rønne, a member of Amundsen's South Pole expedition.

Ronne was the recipient of a special Achievement Award from Columbian College of George Washington University and dedicated a Polar Section to the National Naval Museum.

== Bibliography ==
- Kafarowski, Joanna. Antarctic Pioneer The Trailblazing Life of Jackie Ronne. (Dundurn Press, 2022)
- Ronne, Edith. Antarctica's First Lady (2004)
- "From High Heels to Mukluks" by Edith Ronne
