= Carey Range =

Mountain range in Palmer Land, Antarctica

- Location within Antarctica

Geography
- Region(s): Palmer Land, Antarctica
- Range coordinates: 72°53′S 62°37′W

The Carey Range (72°53′S 62°37′W) is a mountain range, about 35 nautical miles (65 km; 40 mi) long and 5 nautical miles (9.3 km; 5.8 mi) wide with peaks rising to 1,700 metres (5,600 ft), between Mosby Glacier and Fenton Glacier in southeast Palmer Land, Antarctica.

== Location ==
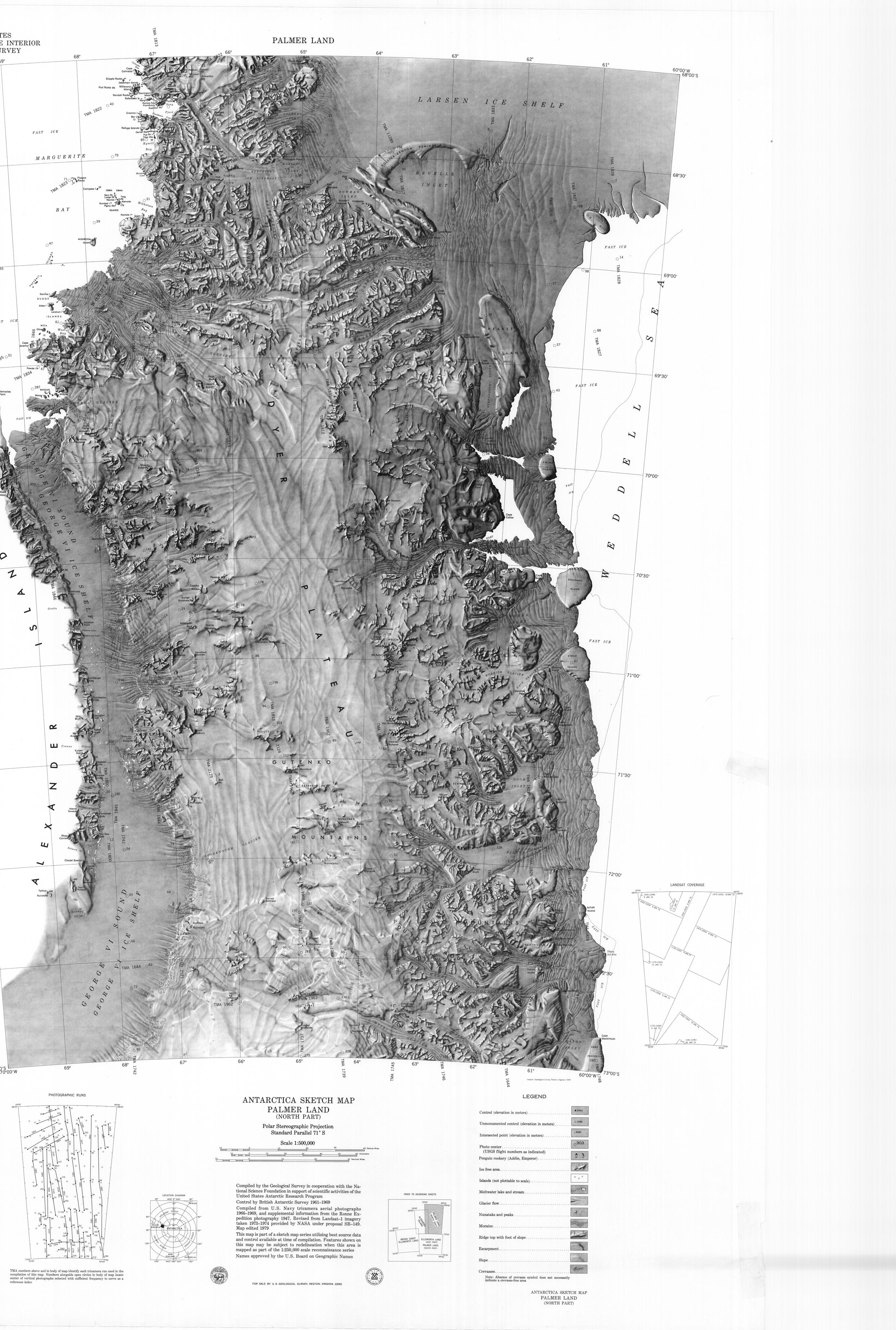
Palmer Land. Carey Range in southeast of map.

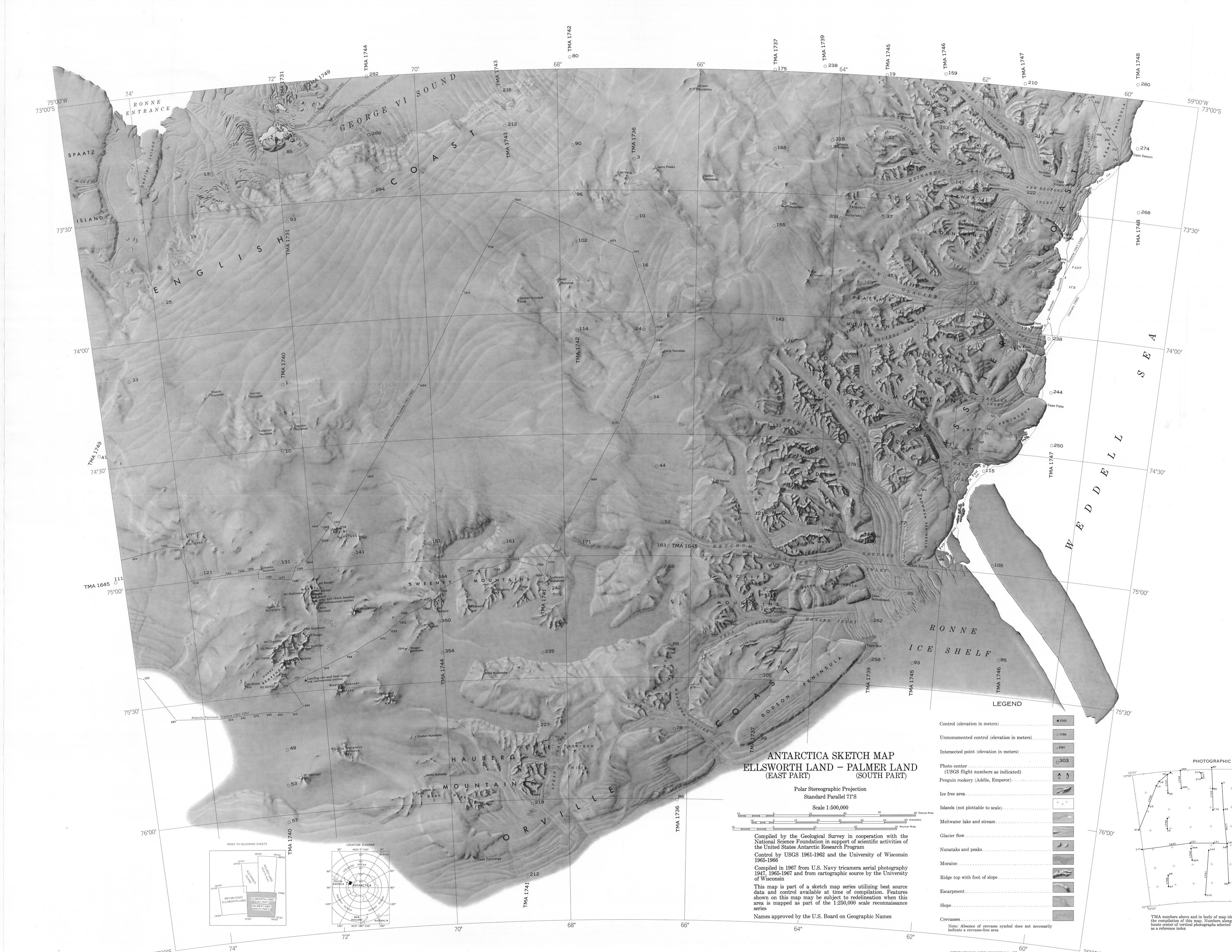
Eastern Ellsworth Land (south), Southern Palmer Land (north). South of Carey Range in northeast of map.

The Carey Range is in south-central Palmer Land. The Wegener Range is to the north and the Dana Mountains to the south. It is bounded by the Fenton Glacier to the northeast and the Mosby Glacier to the southwest. Features include the Sverdrup Nunataks to the north and Mount Adkins in the south. The Journal Peaks are to the west.

== Mapping and name ==
The Carey Range was mapped by the United States Geological Survey (USGS) from United States Navy aerial photographs, 1966–69. In association with the names of continental drift scientists grouped in this area, it was named by the United States Advisory Committee on Antarctic Names (US.ACAN) after Samuel W. Carey, Australian geologist and Professor of Geology at the University of Tasmania, 1946–1970.

== Features ==
=== Sverdrup Nunataks ===
72°45′S 63°15′W. A line of peaks trending WNW-ESE and rising to 1,800 metres (5,900 ft) high in the northwest part of Carey Range, near the edge of the interior plateau in southeast Palmer Land. Mapped by the USGS from aerial photographs taken by the United States Navy, 1966-69. In association with the names of Antarctic oceanographers grouped in this area, named by the UK Antarctic Place-Names Committee (UK-APC) in 1977 after Harald U. Sverdrup (1888-1957), Norwegian oceanographer and meteorologist; Director, Scripps Institution of Oceanography, 1936-48; Director, Norsk Polarinstitutt, 1948-57, and Chairman of the International Committee for the Norwegian-British-Swedish Antarctic Expedition, 1949-52.

=== Mount Adkins ===
73°03′S 62°02′W. Mountain surmounting the north flank of Mosby Glacier just west of the mouth of Fenton Glacier. Mapped by USGS from ground surveys and United States Navy air photos, 1961-67. Named by US-ACAN for Thomas Adkins, cook with the Palmer Station winter party in 1965.

=== Journal Peaks ===
72°41′S 64°55′W. Two groups of separated peaks and nunataks which trend east–west for about 8 nautical miles (15 km; 9.2 mi). They rise 17 nautical miles (31 km; 20 mi) southeast of the Seward Mountains in central Palmer Land. Mapped by USGS from United States Navy aerial photography, 1966-69. Named by US-ACAN after the Antarctic Journal of the United States, established 1966, a publication of the Division of Polar Programs, National Science Foundation, reporting on the U.S. Antarctic Research Program and related activities.

== Sources ==
- Alberts, Fred G., ed. (1995), Geographic Names of the Antarctic (PDF) (2 ed.), United States Board on Geographic Names This article incorporates public domain material from websites or documents of the United States Board on Geographic Names.
- Ellsworth Land - Palmer Land, USGS: United States Geological Survey
- Palmer Land, USGS: United States Geological Survey

This article incorporates public domain material from websites or documents of the United States Geological Survey.
