= Piggott Peninsula =

Peninsula located in Antarctica

- Location within Antarctica

Geography
- Location: Palmer Land, Antarctica
- Coordinates: 73°43′S 61°20′W

Piggott Peninsula (73°43′S 61°20′W) is a broad snow-covered peninsula between New Bedford Inlet and Wright Inlet on Lassiter Coast, Palmer Land, Antarctica. It is bounded to the west by Bryan Glacier and Swann Glacier.

== Location ==
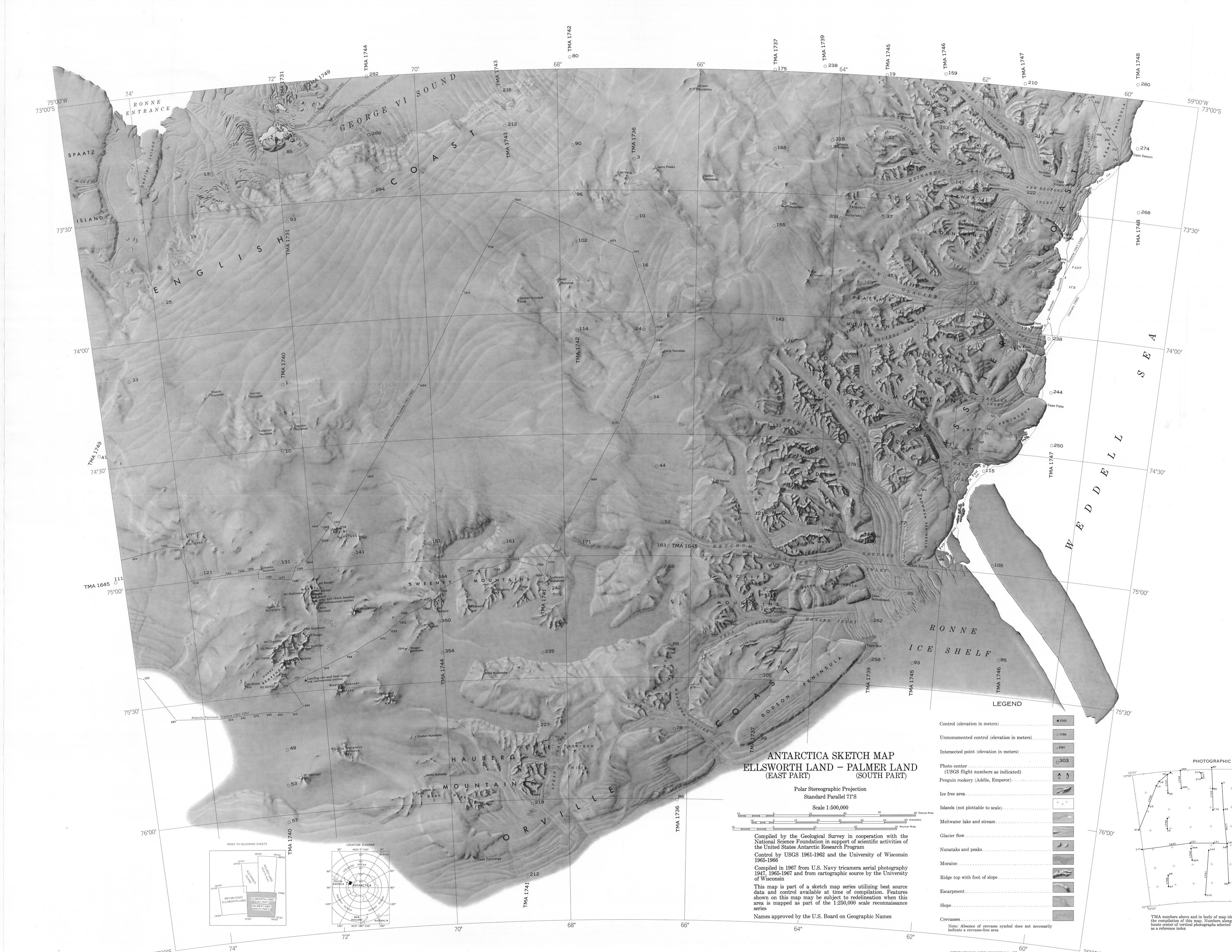
Eastern Ellsworth Land (south), Southern Palmer Land (north). Guettard Range in center east of map.

Piggott Peninsula is on the Lassiter Coast of southern Palmer Land, facing the Weddell Sea to the east. It is between Wright Inlet to the south and New Bedford Inlet to the north. Bryan Glacier runs north along its west side to enter New Bedford Inlet. Arctowski Peak is at the head of Howkins Inlet. Capes, from north to south, include Cape Brooks, Lamb Point and Cape Wheeler.

== Discovery and name ==
Piggott Peninsula was first seen from the air and photographed by the United States Antarctic Service (USAS) on December 30, 1940. It was mapped by United States Geological Survey (USGS) from surveys and United States Navy aerial photographs, 1961–67. It was named by the UK Antarctic Place-Names Committee (UK-APC) in 1985 after William R. Piggott, British ionospheriscist and Head, Atmospheric Sciences Division, British Antarctic Survey (BAS), 1973–79.

== Features ==
=== Arctowski Peak ===
73°44′S 61°28′W. A somewhat isolated ice-covered peak, 1,410 metres (4,630 ft) high, standing 8 nautical miles (15 km; 9.2 mi) west-southwest of the head of Howkins Inlet. Discovered and photographed from the air in December 1940 by members of the USAS. During 1947 the peak was photographed from the air by members of the RARE, under Ronne, who in conjunction with the Falkland Islands Dependencies Survey (FIDS) charted it from the ground. Named by the FIDS for Henryk Arctowski.

=== Howkins Inlet ===
73°40′S 60°54′W. Ice-filled inlet which recedes southwest 6 nautical miles (11 km; 6.9 mi) between Cape Brooks and Lamb Point, along the east coast of Palmer Land. Discovered and photographed from the air in December 1940 by the USAS. During 1947 it was photographed from the air by the RARE under Ronne, who in conjunction with the FIDS charted it from the ground. Named by the FIDS for G. Howkins, meteorologist with the FIDS base at Deception Island in 1944-45.

=== Lamb Point ===
73°41′S 60°48′W. Low, ice-covered point forming the south side of the entrance to Howkins Inlet. Discovered and photographed from the air in December 1940 by the USAS. During 1947 it was photographed from the air by the RARE under Ronne, who in conjunction with the FIDS charted it from the ground. Named by the FIDS for H.H. Lamb, meteorologist on the British whale factory ship Balaena in Antarctic waters in 1946-47, who prepared daily forecasts for the whaling fleet on the basis of FIDS and other meteorological reports

== Sources ==
- Alberts, Fred G., ed. (1995), Geographic Names of the Antarctic (PDF) (2 ed.), United States Board on Geographic Names This article incorporates public domain material from websites or documents of the United States Board on Geographic Names.
- Ellsworth Land - Palmer Land, USGS: United States Geological Survey

This article incorporates public domain material from websites or documents of the United States Geological Survey.
