= Ronnes =

Ronnes is a Dutch surname. Notable people with the surname include:

- Bram Ronnes (born 1978), Dutch beach volleyball player
- Erik Ronnes (born 1967), Dutch politician
- Frans Ronnes (1948–2017), Dutch politician
- Gijs Ronnes (born 1977), Dutch beach volleyball player
