= Martin Rønne =

Norwegian sail maker and polar explorer

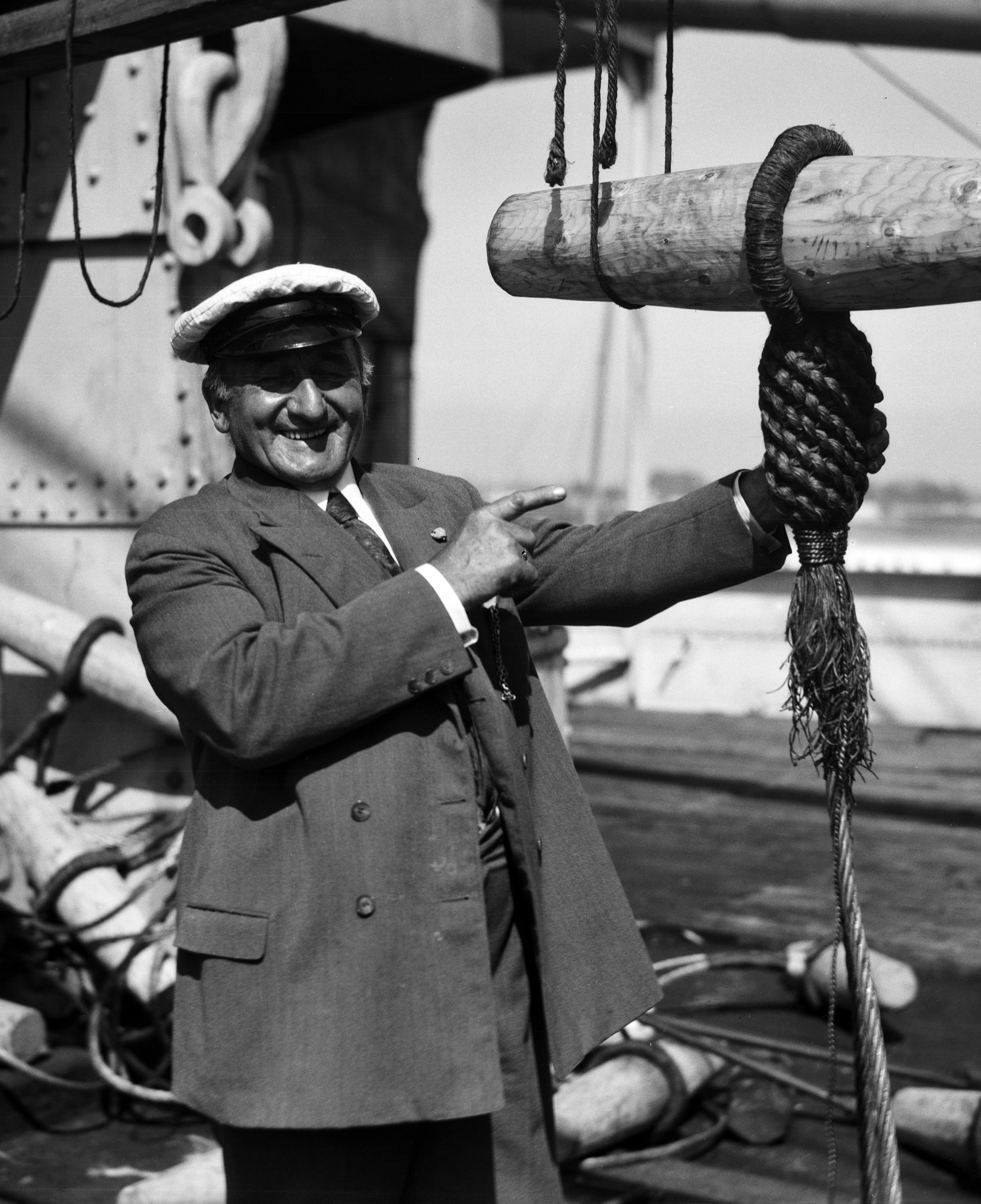
Rønne before Richard E. Byrd's first expedition to Antarctica

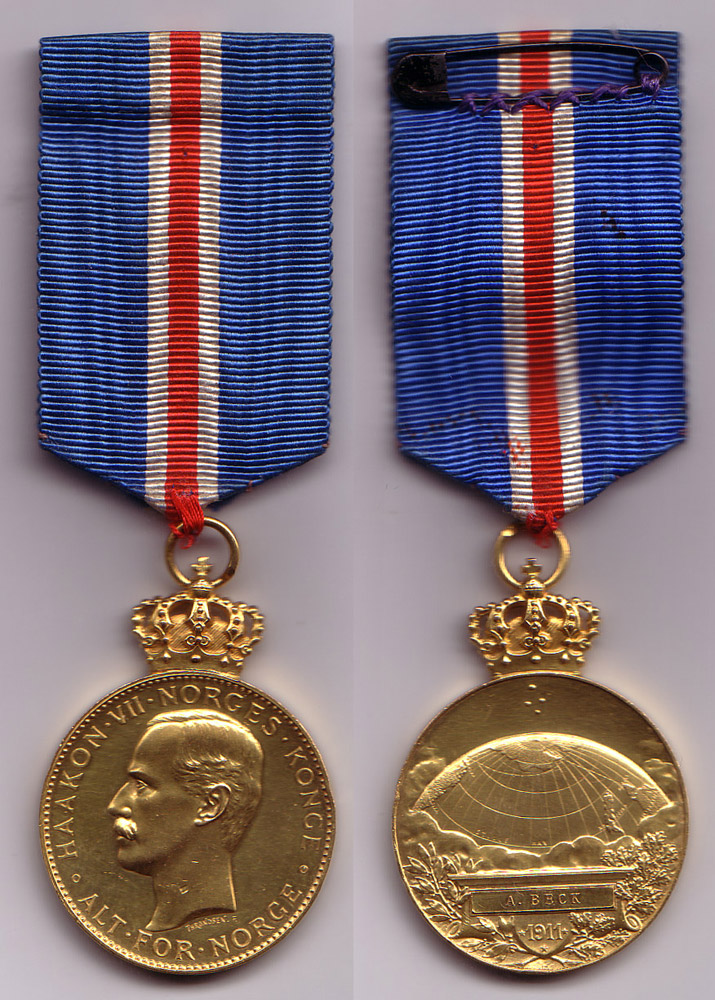
Rønne was awarded the South Pole Medal

Martin Richard Rønne (September 15, 1861 – May 15, 1932) was a Norwegian sail maker and polar explorer.

Rønne was born in Hamar. He took part in Roald Amundsen's expedition to Antarctica in 1910–1912, where he was one of those that remained behind on the Fram while the overwintering group disembarked in the Bay of Whales to prepare for the journey to the South Pole. From 1918 to 1920 he participated in Amundsen's expedition through the Northeast Passage in the Maud, and in 1925 and 1926 he was in Ny-Ålesund, where he helped Amundsen plan his flying boat expedition. He also participated in Richard E. Byrd's first Antarctic expedition from 1928 to 1930.

Rønne was the father of the polar explorer Finn Ronne, who emigrated to the United States in 1923. Rønne was awarded the South Pole Medal.
