= Rönne (river) =

Coordinates: 56.23613°N 12.91905°E

Rönne Rönneån
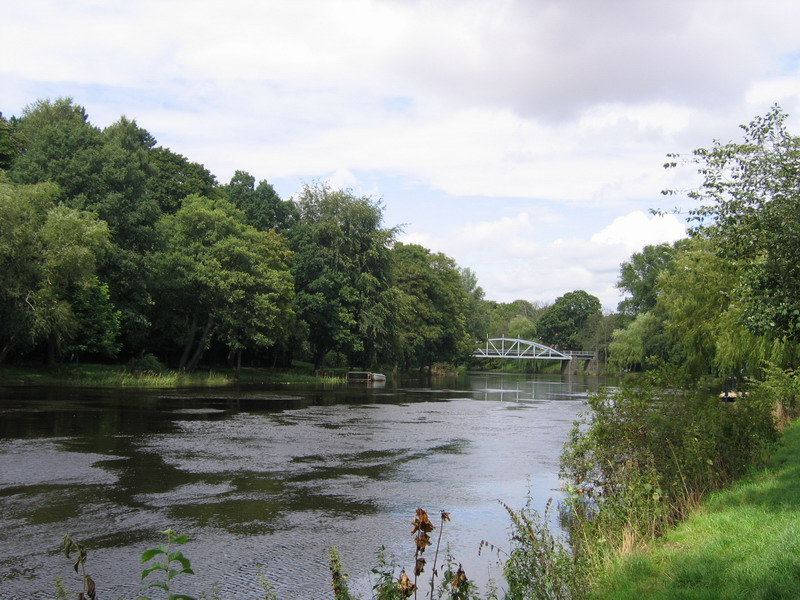
- Native name: Rönne å (Swedish)

Location
- Country: Sweden

Physical characteristics
- Length: 83 km (52 mi)
- Basin size: 1,896.6 km^{2} (732.3 sq mi)
- Discharge
  - average: 22 m^{3}/s (780 cu ft/s)

The Rönne (Swedish: Rönne å) is a river in Scania, Sweden with a length of 83 kilometers. The Rönne flows from Ringsjön and opens into Skälderviken in Ängelholm.
