= Lassiter Coast =

Portion of Antarctic coast

Location of Lassiter Coast

The Lassiter Coast is the portion of the east coast of the Antarctic Peninsula that extends from Cape Mackintosh to Cape Adams. The northern portion of this coast was discovered and photographed from the air by the United States Antarctic Service in 1940. During 1947 the entire extent of the coast was photographed from the air by the Ronne Antarctic Research Expedition (RARE) under Finn Ronne, who in conjunction with the Falkland Islands Dependencies Survey charted it from the ground.

The name was applied by the Advisory Committee on Antarctic Names for Captain James W. Lassiter of the then United States Army Air Forces, who as chief pilot was instrumental in the overall success of the RARE aerial exploratory program. Lassiter was the pilot not only on the flight southwest from Cape Adams, on which geographic discovery was extended to 76°0′S 72°30′W (the Mount Hassage area), but also on the flight southeast to about 79°0′S 43°45′W, on which the seaward edge of the Ronne Ice Shelf and the west and central edge of the Filchner Ice Shelf were sighted and photographed for the first time.

== See also ==
- Piggott Peninsula
