= Finn Ronne =

Norwegian-born US Navy officer and polar explorer (1899–1980)

- Finn Rønne
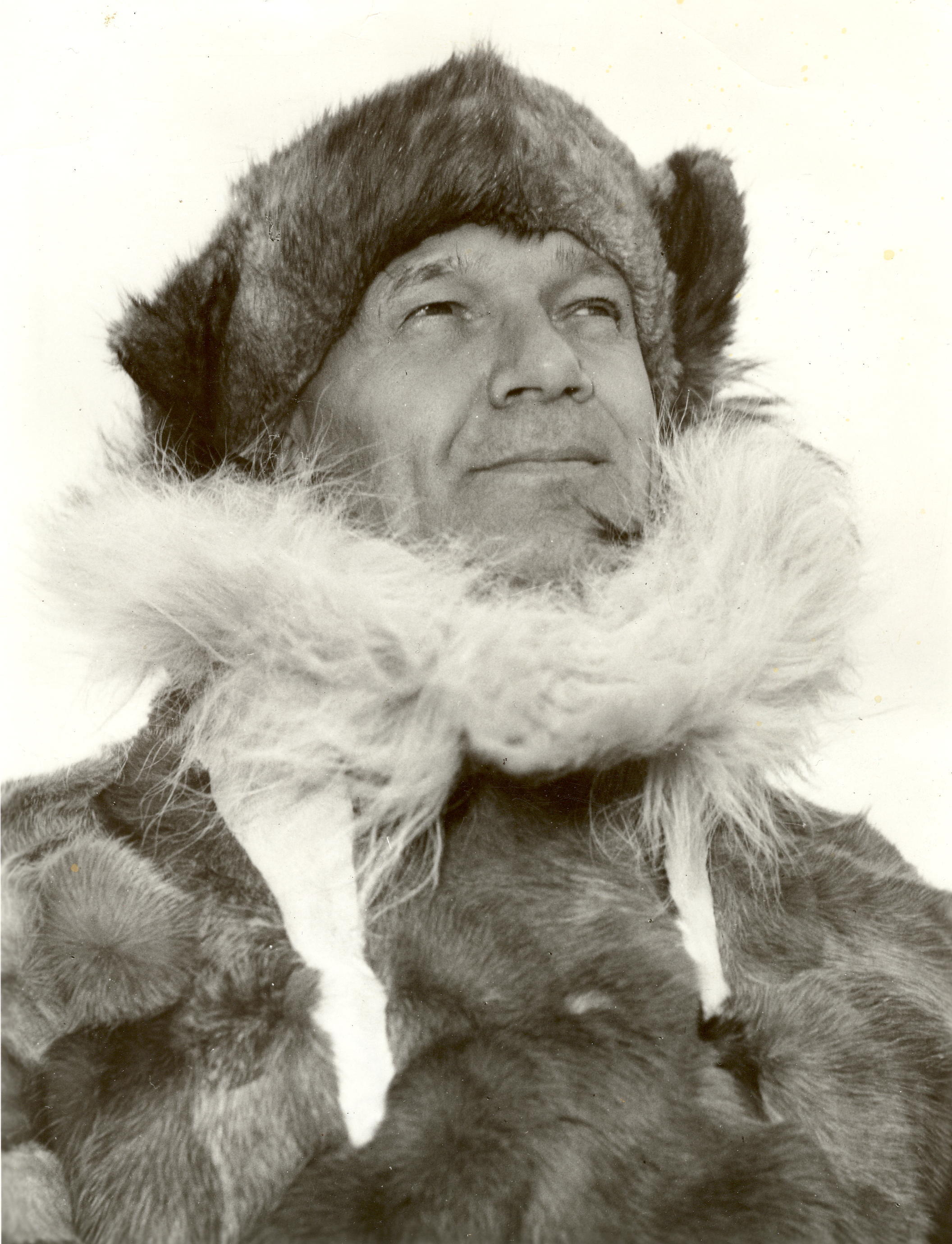
- Born: December 20, 1899; Horten, Sweden-Norway
- Died: January 12, 1980 (aged 80); Bethesda, Maryland, United States
- Resting place: Arlington National Cemetery
- Occupation: Explorer
- Spouse: Edith Ronne

Finn Ronne (December 20, 1899 – January 12, 1980) was a Norwegian-born U.S. citizen and Antarctic explorer.

== Background ==
Finn Ronne was born in Horten, in Vestfold county, Norway. His father, Martin Rønne (1861–1932), was a polar explorer who served in Roald Amundsen's successful expedition to the South Pole. Ronne received his education in engineering at Horten Technical College.

In 1923 Finn Ronne immigrated to the U.S. and gained citizenship in 1929. After working at Westinghouse Electric Corporation for some years, he took part in two of Richard E. Byrd's expeditions to the South Pole, and in 1939 Ronne served as Byrd's executive officer helping discover one thousand miles of new coastline.

After serving several years in the United States Navy, gaining the rank of captain, Ronne returned to Antarctica in the 1940s, with support of the American Geographical Society as the leader of the Ronne Antarctic Research Expedition. From 1946 to 1948 his team mapped and explored the Weddell Sea coastline and set a number of polar records. Ronne covered 3,600 miles by ski and dog sled—more than any other explorer in history. His wife Edith Ronne accompanied him on this expedition, serving as "historian and correspondent for the North American Newspaper Alliance". She and the chief pilot's wife Jennie Darlington were the first women to overwinter in Antarctica.

In the 1950s, the Navy organized Operation Deepfreeze to complete the mapping of Antarctica and establish centers for scientific research. Ronne became the scientific and military leader for a U.S. Weddell Sea base. During his lifetime he wrote several books on Antarctica and many scientific papers on Antarctic research. He received three medals and numerous military awards for service, for geographical exploration and for the advancement of science. He was awarded the St. Olav's Medal by the King of Norway. At his death in 1980, in Bethesda, Maryland, he was buried at Arlington National Cemetery, Arlington, Virginia. The Finn Ronne Memorial Award is awarded by the Explorers Club to an individual noted for accomplishments in polar field research that best typify the spirit of Finn Ronne.

== Bibliography ==
- Biography: Captain Finn Ronne, Naval Historical Center - Primary source
- Antarctic Conquest (1949) (with L. Sprague de Camp, uncredited)
- Antarctic Command (1958)
- Ronne Expedition to Antarctica (1970)
- Antarctica, My Destiny (1979)

== See also ==
- Filchner-Ronne Ice Shelf
- Jackie Ronne
