= List of recipients of the Polar Medal =

This is a list of recipients of the Polar Medal, which is awarded by the Sovereign of the United Kingdom. It was instituted in 1857 as the Arctic Medal and renamed the Polar Medal in 1904.

The years given indicate when the award was announced in the London Gazette, rather than the year of presentation.

A Clasp indicates a subsequent award to a Polar Medal that was awarded earlier.

== 21st century ==
=== 2020s ===
Year	Recipient	Details
2026	Captain William Whatley	Antarctic to 2025. Master RRS Sir David Attenborough.
2026	Professor John Marshall, MA, PhD, FGS	Arctic to 2024. Geologist and Palynologist.
2026	Professor John Woodward, MSc, BSc, PhD, PGHEP, FHEA	Arctic and Antarctic to 2022.Glaciologist.
2026	Professor Colm O’Cofaigh, BA, MSc, PhD, FGS	Arctic and Antarctic to 2024. Glacial and Marine Geologist.
2026	Mr Craig Mathieson	Arctic to 2025. Polar Explorer.
2026	Professor David Roberts, BSc, PhD	Arctic to 2024. Glacial Geologist. Note that an error in the initial Gazette entry was later corrected.
2026	Dr Samuel Doyle, BSc, MSc, PhD	Arctic to 2025. Glaciologist.
2026	Mr Nigel Blenkharn	Antarctic to 2025. Mechanic and Plant Operator.
2025	Dr Gabriele Stowasser, PhD	Antarctic to 2024. Marine Ecologist.
2025	Dr Iain Rudkin, BSc, PhD, FRGS	Dr Iain Rudkin, BSc, PhD, FRGS. Arctic Operations Manager.
2025	Mr Jeremy Robst	Antarctic to 2023. IT Engineer.
2025	Mr John Davies	Antarctic to 2024. Electrician.
2025	Mr Steve Stiglic-Buxton	Antarctic to 2024. Electronics Officer (Communications).
2025	Mrs Sarah Lurcock, BSc	Antarctic to 2024. Museum Manager, Registrar, and Postal Officer South Georgia.
2024	Claus-Dieter Hillenbrand	Antarctic to 2023. Marine Geologist.
2024	Nicholas Gregory	Antarctic to 2023. Facilities Engineering Manager.
2024	Simon Wright	Antarctic and Arctic to 2023. Polar Deck Engineer.
2024	Mark Brandon	Antarctic and Arctic to 2022. Polar Oceanographer.
2024	Steven Andrews	Arctic to 2018. Arctic Geologist.
2024	Victoria Auld	2nd Clasp. Antarctic and Arctic to 2023. Pilot.
2023	David Keith Alan Barnes	Antarctic to 2022. Polar Marine Ecologist.
2023	Ian William Drummond Dalziel	Antarctic to 2014. Polar Geologist.
2023	Joanne Susan Johnson	Antarctic to 2020. Polar Geochemist.
2023	Julius James Rix	Antarctic to 2018. Polar Drilling Engineer.
2023	Richard Anthony Phillips	Antarctic to 2018. Seabird Ecologist.
2023	Thomas Jordan	Antarctic to 2020. Polar Geophysicist.
2023	Steven Paul Brown	Antarctic to 2021. Polar Engineer.
2023	David Hempleman-Adams	2nd Clasp. Arctic and Antarctic to 2022. Polar Explorer/Ambassador.
2023	John Laidlaw Smellie	2nd Clasp. Antarctic to 2017. Polar Volcanologist.
2023	Simon Richard Appleton Kelly	2nd Clasp. Arctic to 2019. Polar Palaeontologist.
2022	Melody Susan Clark	Antarctic And Arctic to 2019. Molecular Scientist.
2022	John William Eager	Antarctic to 2020. Head of Polar Operations.
2022	Markus Michael Frey	Antarctic and Arctic to 2020. Atmospheric and Glaciochemist.
2022	David Neville Thomas	Antarctic and Arctic to 2006. Sea Ice Ecologist and Biogeochemist.
2022	Ian Morley Brooks	Arctic and Antarctic to 2020. Atmospheric Scientist.
2021	Anker, Paul Gavin David	Antarctic to 2020. Drilling Engineer.
2021	Bowen, Albert Martin	Arctic and Antarctic to 2020. CPO Science Operations.
2021	Wilkinson, Jeremy Paul	Arctic and Antarctic to 2019. Polar Oceanographer (Sea Ice).
2020	Massey, Alison Joanne	Antarctic to 2019. Marine Assistant, Station Leader and Laboratory Manager.
2020	Meredith, Michael Paul	Antarctic to 2016. Polar Oceanographer.
2020	Harper, John Reynolds	2nd Clasp. Antarctic to 2019. Captain of Polar research vessels.
2020	Whitham, Andrew Gordon	2nd Clasp. Polar Geologist.

=== 2010s ===
Year	Recipient	Details
2019	Fielding, Sophie	Antarctic to 2018. Biological Oceanographer specialising in fisheries acoustics.
2019	Mulvaney, Robert	2nd Clasp. Antarctic to 2016. Antarctic Scientist specialising in ice core drilling.
2019	Shears, John Richard	Antarctic to 2015. Polar Geographer and Expedition Leader.
2019	Thomas, Catrin Sian	Antarctic to 2017. Polar Field Guide.
2018	Beasley, Capt Mark Grant	Antarctic to 2017. Antarctic Pilot and Training Captain, flying specialist Aircraft in support of Polar Science.
2018	Newsham, Kevin Kerr	Antarctic and Arctic to 2017. Polar Soil Biologist specialising in soil fungi and nutrient cycling.
2018	Wake, James Michael Stewart	Antarctic and Arctic to 2017. Polar Expedition Leader and Base Commander.
2018	Cox, Nicholas Ievers	2nd Clasp. Arctic to 2017. Station Leader developing an international research community at Ny-Ålesund in the Arctic.
2017	King, Stephen Mark	Arctic and Antarctic to 2016. Arctic and Antarctic Pilot flying flying specialist Aircraft in support of Polar Science.
2017	Ian Lamont Boyd	Arctic and Antarctic to 2016. Marine Scientist specialising in the ecology of the Southern Ocean.
2017	Gerrard, Isabelle	Antarctic to 2016. Antarctic Base Chef.
2017	Nienow, Peter	Arctic to 2013. Glaciologist specialising in glacier hydrology, ice-dynamics and ice mass response to climate change.
2017	Michael Paul Smith	Arctic to 2012. Arctic Geologist and Polar Scholar in Palaeobiology and Earth History.
2017	Myrtle Lillias Simpson	Arctic to 2007. Explorer of Arctic regions; sea canoeist, climber and writer.
2017	Alastair Edward Henry Worsley	Antarctic to 2016. Antarctic explorer.
2017	Andrew Mark Smith	2nd Clasp. Antarctic to 2015. Polar Glaciologist.
2016	Derek Ernest Fordham	Arctic to 2015. Arctic Expedition leader, mountaineer and ambassador.
2016	Kim Crosbie	Antarctic and Arctic to 2015. Antarctic Environmental Scientist and Conservationist. Specialising in wildlife/human interactions, visitor management, education and outreach.
2016	Bryn Pugh Hubbard	Arctic and Antarctic to 2015. Polar Scholar in Glaciology, Glacial Geology and the Structure and Motion of ice masses.
2016	Clement Peter Collins	Antarctic to 2015. Antarctic Base Cook, Base Assistant, Field Assistant and Air Unit Assistant.
2016	Agnieszka Genowefa Fryckowska	Antarctic to 2015. Meteorologist, Antarctic Winter and Summer Station Leader.
2016	Ian William Potten	Antarctic to 2015. Antarctic Pilot flying specialist Aircraft in support of Polar science.
2016	Jérôme Pierre Poncet	Antarctic to 2015. Antarctic Vessel Master, supplying logistics in support of Polar Science and Antarctic wildlife documentaries.
2015	Geoffrey Stuart Boulton	Arctic and Antarctic to 2012. Polar Scholar in Glaciology, Glacial Geology & Geomorphology, Glacio marine Systems and Quaternary Glacial History.
2015	lain Hugh Murray Smart	Arctic to 2002. Arctic Scientist, Expedition Leader, Mountaineer and Ambassador.
2015	Felicity Ann Dawn Aston	Arctic and Antarctic to 2012. Antarctic Meteorologist, Polar Explorer, Expedition Leader and Ambassador.
2015	Peter Furneaux Friend	Arctic to 1970. Arctic Geologist, Expedition Leader and Chair of Cambridge Arctic Shelf Programme.
2015	Sally Elizabeth Poncet	Antarctic to 2012. Antarctic Environmentalist, Wildlife & Heritage Surveyor and Ambassador.
2015	Patrick Murray Lurcock	Antarctic to 2014. Antarctic Physicist, South Georgia Marine and Government Officer.
2013	Dominic Adam Hodgson	Antarctic to 2013. Palaeolimnologist—British Antarctic Survey.
2013	Stephen William Canham	Antarctic to 2013. Senior Buildings Engineer—British Antarctic Survey.
2013	Robert George Bingham	Arctic and Antarctic to 2013. Glaciologist— Natural Environment Research Council, Antarctic Funding Initiative; Polar Glaciologist and Geophysicist—University of Edinburgh.
2013	Phillippe Whitaker Francis Gribbon	Arctic to 1977. Arctic Explorer, Mountaineer and Scientist.
2013	David Kim Hempleman-Adams	Arctic and Antarctic to 2012. Polar Explorer and Ambassador.
2012	Steven Richard Colwell	Antarctic to 2012. Meteorologist, British Antarctic Survey.
2012	John Cameron Withers	Antarctic to 2011. Base Commander, British Antarctic Survey.
2012	Simon Martin Garrod	Antarctic to 2012. Polar Field Leader—British Antarctic Survey/Antarctic, Logistics and Expeditions.
2012	Terrence Vincent Callaghan	Arctic to 2012. Professor in Arctic Ecology, University of Sheffield. Director, Swedish Royal Academy of Science—Abisko Station.
2012	Tudor Morgan	Antarctic to 2012. Field Operations Manager—British Antarctic Survey, Operations Manager—United Kingdom Antarctic Heritage Trust.
2012	Edward Christopher John Clapp	Antarctic 1957–60. Radio Operator, Base Commander—Falkland Island Dependencies Survey.
2011	Paul William Cousens	Antarctic to 2011. Deputy Project Manager, British Antarctic Survey.
2011	Benjamin Richard Norrish	Antarctic to 2011. Vehicle Engineer, British Antarctic Survey.
2011	Michael Lance Curtis	Antarctic to 2011. Field Geologist, British Antarctic Survey.
2011	Michael James Bentley	Antarctic to 2011. Professor in Quaternary Environmental Change, Durham University.
2011	Christian Kevin David Jacobs	Antarctic to 2011. Field Facilities Manager, Antarctic Logistics and Expeditions.
2011	David Thomson Meldrum	Arctic & Antarctic to 2011. Polar Sciences Support Technician, Scottish Association for Marine Science.
2011	Michael John Hambrey	2nd Clasp. Arctic & Antarctic to 2011. Professor of Glaciology, Aberystwyth University.
2010	Duncan Evan Anderson	Antarctic to 2010. Chief Engineer, RRS James Clark Ross.
2010	David John Maxfield	Antarctic to 2010. Electronics Engineer, British Antarctic Survey.
2010	Andrew Charles McConnachie	Antarctic to 2010. Plant Technician, British Antarctic Survey.
2010	Teal Riley	Antarctic to 2010. Geologist, British Antarctic Survey.
2010	Peter Ward	Antarctic to 2010. Marine Research Scientist, British Antarctic Survey.
2010	Graham Phillip Chapman	Antarctic & Arctic to 2010. Master, RRS James Clark Ross.
2010	Martyn Tranter	Antarctic & Arctic to 2010. Professor of Physical Geography, Bristol University.
2010	Jonathan Ralph Ineson	Arctic & Antarctic to 2010. Geologist, Geological Survey of Denmark and Greenland.
2010	Douglas George Allan	2nd Clasp. Antarctic & Arctic to 2009. Cameraman, BBC Natural History Unit.

=== 2000s ===
Year	Recipient	Details
2009	John Richard Westland Hanson	Antarctic to 1999. Personnel Officer, British Antarctic Survey.
2009	Robert David Larter	Antarctic to 2009. Marine Geologist, British Antarctic Survey.
2009	Alan Peter Meredith	Antarctic to 2009. Chief Pilot, British Antarctic Survey.
2008	Derek Michael Forward	Antarctic to 2007. Chief Engineer, RRS Ernest Shackleton.
2008	Penelope Granger	Antarctic to 2008. Dental Officer, British Antarctic Survey.
2008	Lloyd Samuel Peck	Antarctic to 2008. Biologist, British Antarctic Survey.
2008	Richard Atkinson	Antarctic & Arctic to 2008. Field Assistant, Dog Driver and Polar Conservationist.
2008	Adrian John Fox	Antarctic & Arctic to 2008. Head of Mapping and Geographic Information Centre, British Antarctic Survey.
2008	Andrew Charles Clarke	2nd Clasp. Antarctic & Arctic to 2008. Head of Science Division and Research Scientist, British Antarctic Survey.
2007	Simon Brockington	Antarctic to 1999. Marine Assistant and Biologist.
2007	Peter Convey	Antarctic to 2006. Terrestrial Biologist.
2007	Alan Michael Carroll	Antarctic to 2006. Base Leader, Ionosphericist, Polar Historian and Conservationist.
2007	Victoria Jane Auld	Antarctic to 2007. Base Commander and Meteorologist.
2007	Russell Scott Ladkin	Antarctic to 2007. Instrument Engineer.
2007	Philip Timothy Leat	Antarctic to 2007. Research Geologist.
2007	David Francis Leatherdale	Antarctic to 2007. Line Pilot and Survey Pilot.
2007	Peter Charles Denis Lens	Antarctic to 2007. Communications Manager and IT Support Specialist.
2007	Robert Crawford Paterson	Antarctic & Arctic to 2007. Chief Officer, RRS James Clark Ross.
2006	Michael George Richardson	Antarctic to 2005. Zoologist, Base Leader and Head of Polar Regions, Foreign and Commonwealth Office.
2006	Patrick George Fielder	Antarctic to 2006. Plant Technician and Facilities Manager.
2006	Stephen Victor Hinde	Antarctic to 2006. Field Assistant and Winter Base Commander.
2006	Malcolm Inch	Antarctic to 2006. Marine Engineering Officer, RRS ErnestShackleton.
2006	Leslie Kitson	Antarctic to 2006. Aircraft Pilot and Training Captain BAS Flight.
2006	Thomas Anthony Lachlan-Cope	Antarctic to 2006. Polar Meteorologist.
2006	Jonathan Lowton Watkins	Antarctic to 2006. Marine Biologist and Ecologist.
2006	Geoffrey Francis Hattersley-Smith	Antarctic & Arctic to 1988. Geologist, Glaciologist, Base Leader and Polar Toponomist.
2006	Tavi Murray	Arctic & Antarctic to 2006. Glaciologist.
2005	Jonathan David Shanklin	Antarctic to 2004. Meteorologist.
2005	Andrew Thomas Barker	Antarctic to 2005. Communications Manager and Winter Base Commander.
2005	Hugh Francis Joseph Corr	Antarctic to 2005. Ice Radar Scientist.
2005	Antonio Gatti	Antarctic to 2005. Chief Officer and Acting Master RRS Ernest Shackleton.
2004	Michael Edward Patrick Gloistein	Antarctic to 2004. Radio Officer and Electro-Technical Officer (Communications)
2004	Matthew Robert Jobson	Antarctic to 2004. Carpenter and Builder.
2004	Steven Marshall	Antarctic to 2004. Plumber, Field Assistant and Base Commander.
2004	Nigel Douglas Pearson	Antarctic to 2004. Aircraft Pilot.
2004	Mark Stewart	Antarctic to 2004. Information Technology Support and Communications Manager
2004	Stephen George White	Antarctic to 2004. Head of Vehicles and Engineering Section.
2004	John Patrick Croxall	2nd Clasp. Head of Birds & Seals Section, Biological Sciences Division
2004	Douglas Gordon Bone	2nd Clasp. Antarctic to 2004. Marine Biologist.
2004	Rodney John Arnold	Antarctic to 2003. Field Operations Manager.
2004	Adrian Jenkins	Antarctic to 2003. Glaciologist.
2004	Keith William Nicholls	Antarctic to 2003. Oceanographer.
2004	David Glyn Vaughan	Antarctic to 2003. Glaciologist.
2004	Keith Makinson	Antarctic & Arctic to 2003. Drilling Engineer.
2004	Elizabeth Mary Morris	Antarctic & Arctic to 2003. Glaciologist.
2004	Allan Gill	2nd Clasp. Antarctic & Arctic to 1989. Polar Scientist and Explorer
2003	James Edward Butler Futtit Farrington	Antarctic 1944–45. Senior Radio Officer (since deceased).
2002	Simon Leigh Harley	Antarctic to 1993. Geologist. Geological studies in Prydz Bay and Enderby Land.
2001	Jane Elizabeth Francis	
2001	John Bryce Marshall	
2001	David Cowen Routledge	
2000	Matthew George Edworthy	Antarctic to 2000. Geologist.
2000	David William Ganiford	Antarctic to 2000. Generator Mechanic, Winter Base Commander and Station Support Manager.
2000	Gerard Henry Nicholson	Antarctic & Arctic to 2000. Aircraft Engineer and Head of Air Unit.
2000	Clive Edwin Johnson	Antarctic & Arctic to 2000. Field Assistant and Logistics Manager.
2000	Simon Richard Appleton Kelly	Arctic & Antarctic to 2000. Palaeontologist.
2000	Richard Ian Kressman	2nd Clasp. Antarctic to 1999. Electronics Engineer.
2000	Ronald Ian Lewis-Smith	2nd Clasp. Antarctic to 2000. Botanist and Ecologist.

== 20th century ==
=== 1990s ===
Year	Recipient	Details
1999	Martin Hutchinson Bell	Antarctic to 1999. Plant Operator and Winter Base Commander.
1999	Simon Neil Gill	Antarctic to 1999. Carpenter, Support Manager and Base Commander.
1999	Edward Charles King	Antarctic to 1999. Geophysicist.
1999	Stephen John Martin	Antarctic & Arctic to 1997. Boatman, Winter Base Commander and Expeditioner.
1999	David Mitchell	Antarctic & Arctic to 1997. Electrician, Base Commander and Expeditioner.
1998	John Nelson Norman	Antarctic to 1994. Medical Officer and Chief Medical Officer BAS Medical Unit.
1998	Mark Andrew Clilverd	Antarctic to 1995. Upper Atmospheric Physicist.
1998	John Reynolds Harper	Antarctic to 1998. Chief Officer R.R.S James Clark Ross.
1998	Robert Mulvaney	Antarctic to 1998. Glaciologist.
1998	Michael Charles Rose	Antarctic to 1998. Electronics Engineer.
1998	Paul Rose	Antarctic to 1998. Polar Guide and Base Commander.
1998	Edward John Wright	Antarctic & Arctic to 1995. Field Assistant, Mountaineering & Expedition Leader.
1998	Michael Roger Worland	Antarctic & Arctic to 1998. Research Technician & Research Scientist.
1998	Kenneth William Hankinson	Arctic & Antarctic to 1991. Joint Services Expedition Leader.
1997	Michael Ernest Dinn	Antarctic to 1996. Polar Guide and Base Commander.
1997	Leslie Peter Whittamore	Antarctic to 1997. Electrician and Base Commander.
1997	Dougal Jocelyn Goodman	Arctic and Antarctic to 1982. Glaciologist.
1997	Crispin Mark Jeremy Day	Arctic and Antarctic to 1997. Field Guide, Party Leader and Logistics Manager.
1997	Elizabeth Margaret Ethelwyn Harland	Arctic to 1992. General Assistant.
1997	Simon Paul Price	Arctic to 1997. Geologist and Deputy Leader, East Greenland Project.
1996	Nigel Brian Dean	Antarctic 1992-94. Diesel Mechanic.
1996	Steven Thomas Dow	Antarctic 1992-94. Plumber and Winter Base Commander.
1996	Steven Robert Cuthbertson	Antarctic 1993-95. Meteorologist and Communications Manager.
1996	Duncan Haigh	Antarctic 1994-95. Physicist and Winter Base Commander.
1996	Brian Mallon	Antarctic to 1995. Electrician and Winter Base Commander.
1996	Philip Stuart Anderson	Antarctic to 1996. Meteorologist.
1996	Stuart Andrew Bell	Antarctic to 1996. Electronics Technician and Radio Operator.
1996	Robert Wellesley Burton	Antarctic and Arctic to 1996. Meteorologist, Biological Assistant and Museum Curator.
1995	Neil Stephen Gilbert	Antarctic to 1994. Marine Biologist and Base Commander.
1995	David John Cutting	Antarctic to 1995. Chief Engineer Officer RRS James Clark Ross.
1995	Martin Clive Davey	Antarctic to 1995. Plant Ecologist and Winter Base Commander.
1995	Hector Ewan Macalister	Antarctic to 1995. Biological Field Technician and Base Manager.
1995	Russell Manning	Antarctic to 1995. Boatman and Winter Base Commander.
1995	Alan Henry Milne	Antarctic to 1995. Doctor of Medicine.
1995	John Martin Kimbrey	Antarctic to 1995. Warrant Officer 1st Class Royal Marines and Leader Joint Services Expedition, Smith Island 1994-95.
1995	John Kenneth Spottiswood	Antarctic to 1995. Major Royal Logistic Corps, and Deputy Leader Joint Services Expedition, Smith Island 1994-95.
1995	Andrew Gordon Whitham	Antarctic and Arctic to 1995. Geologist.
1994	Patrick John Cooper	Antarctic to 1993. Ionosphericist and Electronic Engineer.
1994	Andrew George Spearey	Antarctic to 1993. Tractor Mechanic, Winter Base Commander and Vehicles Manager.
1994	Simon Everard Taylor	Antarctic to 1994. Chief Engineer Officer RRS James Clark Ross.
1994	Julian Andrew Dowdeswell	Arctic to 1994. Glacier Geophysicist.
1994	Michael Adrian Stroud	Arctic and Antarctic to 1993. Doctor of Medicine and Research Scientist.
1994	John Richard Dudeney	2nd Clasp. Antarctic to 1994. Geospace Research Scientist.
1994	Ranulph Fiennes	2nd Clasp. Arctic and Antarctic to 1993. Polar Expedition Leader.
1994	Geoffrey Usher Somers	British Polar exploration and research to 1990. General Field Assistant, mountain guide and dog team driver.
1994	Andrew Mark Smith	To 1992. Glacier Geophysicist.
1994	Gregory Mark Wilkinson	To 1992. Winter Base Commander and Diving Officer.
1993	Sterling James Aldridge	Boatswain, RRS Bransfield.
1993	Andrew David Alsop	Aircraft Pilot.
1993	Michael Jeremy Stuart Burgan	Chief Officer RRS John Biscoe.
1993	Nicholas levers COX,	Arctic and Antarctic Base Commander.
1993	Ian William Lovegrove	Antarctic Base Commander.
1993	Peter Timothy Marquis	Antarctic Base Commander.
1993	Ashley Clarke Mortom	Antarctic Base Commander.
1993	Brian William Newham	Antarctic Base Commander.
1993	Maurice Joseph Paul O'Donnell	Senior Communications Officer.
1993	Barry John Peters	Communications Officer.
1993	Robin Charles Plumley	Chief Officer RRS James Clark Ross.
1993	Peter Radford Stark	Antarctic Base Commander.
1993	John Welsford Summers	Boatswain, RRS James Clark Ross.
1993	Norman Edwin Thomas	Marine Electrical Officer, RRS James Clark Ross.
1993	Jeffrey Allan Wearden	Antarctic Base Cook.
1993	Stuart James Lawrence	2nd Clasp. Master, RRS Bransfield.
1993	Alan Smith	2nd Clasp. Head of Building Section British Antarctic Survey.
1993	Margaret Ann Bradshaw	Silver. Antarctic. New Zealand.
1992	John Patrick Crox	Marine Ecologist, British Antarctic Survey.
1992	Verner Duncan Carse	Clasp. Expedition Leader, South Georgia Surveys 1951-57.
1991	Graeme Geoffrey Claridgw	Antarctic 1959-1990. New Zealand.
1991	Iain Bruce Campbell	Antarctic 1964-1990. New Zealand.
1991	John Alan MacDonald	Antarctic 1981-1990. New Zealand.
1991	Peter Frank Barker	Geophysicist. British Antarctic Survey.
1991	William Stanley Lawrence Wooley	Expedition Leader, East Greenland Expeditions.
1990	Sievewright, William Munro	Physicist / Personnel Officer, British Antarctic Survey.
1990	William Nigel Bonner	Biologist, British Antarctic Survey.
1990	Lewis, Gordon	Marine Electrical Officer, British Antarctic Survey.

=== 1980s ===
Year	Recipient	Details
1989	Brian Gerard GARDINER	Head of Radiation and OzoneSection, British Antarctic Survey.
1989	William Charles BLOCK	Head of Terrestrial Biology Section, British Antarctic Survey.
1989	Michael Ray GORMAN	Research Assistant, Research Associate, Scott Polar Research Institute.
1989	Michael John HAMBREY	Geological Consultant, ResearchAssociate, Scott Polar Research Institute.
1988	SALMON, Eric Michael Paul	Meteorologist, British Antarctic Survey.
1988	CHINN, Eric James	Base Commander, British Antarctic Survey.
1988	MCMANUS, Alan James	Cook and Winter BaseCommander, British Antarctic Survey.
1988	SQUIRE, Vernon Arthur,	Research Scientist/Mathematician, Scott Polar Research Institute.
1988	MOORE, Stuart Constantinos	Chief Technician/Development Engineer, Scott Polar Research Institute.
1988	SWAN, Robert	Expedition Leader, In The Footsteps Of Scott Expedition.
1988	MEAR, Roger,	Expedition Member, In The Footsteps Of Scott Expedition.
1988	WOOD, Gareth,	Expedition Member, In The Footsteps Of Scott Expedition.
1987	Alan Johnson ALLISON	Chief Engineer, British Antarctic Survey.
1987	Andrew Colin BAKER	Chief Officer, British Antarctic Survey.
1987	Nicholas Anthony BEER	Chief Officer, British Antarctic Survey.
1987	Robert Edward BOWLER	Diesel Mechanic and Base Commander, British Antarctic Survey.
1987	Robert Seymour CHANT	Chief Engineer, British Antarctic Survey.
1987	Christopher Robert ELLIOTT	Master, British Antarctic Survey.
1987	Eric Arthur HEATHORN	Chief Cook, Catering Officer, British Antarctic Survey.
1987	Christopher Charles JOHNSON	Third Engineer, British Antarctic Survey.
1987	John NEWMAN	Tractor and Diesel Mechanic, British Antarctic Survey.
1987	Edmund Malcolm Stuart PHELPS	Master, British Antarctic Survey.
1987	Robert WADE	Radio Operator, British Antarctic Survey.
1987	Hugh Magee O'GORMAN	Clasp. Radio Operator, British Antarctic Survey.
1987	John Richard FURSE, Commander R.N.	Expedition Leader, Scientific Coordinator, Ornithologist, Mountaineer, Joint Services Expedition to Brabant Island.
1987	Ian Edward ATKINS, Corporal R.A.F.	Mountaineer, Surveyor, Maintenance Engineer, Joint Services Expedition to Brabant Island.
1987	Gerald CORBETT, Leading Airman R.N	Photographer, Joint Services Expedition to Brabant Island.
1987	Michael John RINGE	Geologist, Skidoo Driver, Mountaineer, Joint Services Expedition to Brabant Island.
1987	THOMPSON, Howard Ernest	Electronics Engineer, British Antarctic Survey.
1987	TURTON, James Thomas Eric	Electronics Engineer, British Antarctic Survey.
1987	YEARBY, Keith Howard	Physicist, VLF Radio Waves, British Antarctic Survey.
1987	WHITE, Martin Guy	Marine Biologist, British Antarctic Survey.
1986	Sir Ranulph Twistleton-Wykeham-FIENNES, Bart.	Expedition Leader, Transglobe Expedition.
1986	Lady Virginia Twistleton-Wykeham-FiENNES	Radio Operator, Transglobe Expedition.
1986	Charles Reginald BURTON	General Assistant and Cook, Transglobe Expedition.
1986	Oliver Wilfrid Nicholas SHEPARD	Mechanic, Transglobe Expedition.
1986	David John DREWRY	Glaciology and Geophysics Researcher, Scott Polar Research Institute.
1986	Peter WADHAMS	Physicist, Scott Polar Research Institute.
1986	Leonard Raymond AIREY	Ionospheric Physicist and Base Commander, British Antarctic Survey.
1986	David Michael BURKITT	Boatman/General Assistant and Base Commander, British Antarctic Survey.
1986	Andrew Charles CLARKE	Marine Biologist, British Antarctic Survey.
1986	Roger Anthony Stuart CLAYTON	Geologist, British Antarctic Survey.
1986	John HALL	Diving Officer and Base Commander, British Antarctic Survey.
1986	Mark Peter David LEWIS	Meteorologist/Physicist and Base Commander, British Antarctic Survey.
1986	David John ORCHARD	Meteorologist, British Antarctic Survey.
1986	Michael Colin SHARP	Field Assistant and Base Commander, British Antarctic Survey.
1986	Philip STONE	Geologist, British Antarctic Survey.
1986	Garry STUDD	Aircraft Pilot, British Antarctic Survey.
1986	Nigel St. John YOUNG	Field Assistant, British Antarctic Survey.
1986	Ian Bruce COLLINGE	Biological Technician, British Antarctic Survey.
1986	Richard David CRABTREE	Glaciologist, British Antarctic Survey.
1986	James Alastair CRAME	Geologist Palaeontologist, British Antarctic Survey.
1986	Christopher Samuel McClure DOAKE	Glaciologist, British Antarctic Survey.
1986	John Cynan ELLIS-EVANS	Freshwater Biologist, British Antarctic Survey.
1986	Paul GOODALL-COPESTAKE	Biological Technician, British Antarctic Survey.
1986	David Iain Macpherson MACDONALD,	Geologist, British Antarctic Survey.
1986	Terence Seamus McCANN	Seal Biologist, British Antarctic Survey.
1986	Robert John PANKHURST	Geologist Geochronologist, British Antarctic Survey.
1986	Julian Gerald PAREN	Glaciologist, British Antarctic Survey.
1986	David Anthony PEEL	Glaciologist, British Antarctic Survey.
1986	John Robert POTTER	Glaciologist, British Antarctic Survey.
1986	Richard Andrew PRICE	Antarctic Marine Technician, British Antarctic Survey.
1986	Alan Stuart RODGER	Ionospheric Physicist, British Antarctic Survey.
1986	John Laidlaw SMELLIE	Geologist, British Antarctic Survey.
1986	Andrew John SMITH	Physicist, British Antarctic Survey.
1986	Bryan Cecil STOREY	Geologist, British Antarctic Survey.
1986	David Winston Harris WALTON	Antarctic Botanist, Environmental Scientist, British Antarctic Survey.
1986	Jonathan Launcelot William WALTON	Glaciologist, Surveyor, British Antarctic Survey.
1986	Inigo EVERSON	Clasp. Marine Biologist, British Antarctic Survey.
1986	Ronald Barry HEYWOOD	Clasp. Freshwater and Marine Biologist, British Antarctic Survey.
1986	David William Sharper LIMBERT	Clasp. Chief Meteorologist, British Antarctic Survey.
1986	Michael Robert Alexander THOMSON	Clasp. Geologist, British Antarctic Survey.
1985	George Ethelbert HEMMEN	Administrative Staff Royal Society to 1982
1985	Richard Ian KRESSMAN	To 1981. Ionospheric Project Engineer, British Antarctic Survey.
1985	Michael PINNOCK	To 1982. Ionospheric Engineer, British Antarctic Survey.
1985	Robert Keith HEADLAND	To 1982. Biological Assistant, British Antarctic Survey.
1984	Allan John DAWRANT	1975-76. Radio Technician, New Zealand National Antarctic Research Expeditions.
1984	James Sidney RANKIN	1976-77. Base Engineer, New Zealand National Antarctic Research Expeditions.
1984	Dr. David Norman Bryant SKINNER	1977-78. Geologist, New Zealand National Antarctic Research Expeditions.
1984	John Rueben THOMSON	1977-78. Base Engineer, New Zealand National Antarctic Research Expeditions.
1984	Kevin Mclntyre WEATHERALL	1976-77. Senior Technical Officer, New Zealand National Antarctic Research Expeditions.
1984	Michael Roger WING,	1975-76. Maintenance Officer, New Zealand National Antarctic Research Expeditions.
1983	Douglas George ALLAN	To 1981. Scientific Diver, British Antarctic Survey.
1983	Stuart James LAWRENCE	To 1981. Ship's Master, British Antarctic Survey.
1983	David Michael ROOTES	To 1981. Base Commander, British Antarctic Survey.
1982	Donald DETTMAN	To 1979. Senior Diesel Mechanic, Australian National Antarctic Research Expeditions.
1982	Michael KNOX-LITTLE	To 1979. Radio Operator, Australian National Antarctic Research Expeditions.
1982	David SHEEHY	To 1979. Glaciologist, Australian National Antarctic Research Expeditions.
1981	Douglas Gordon BONE	To 1978. Marine Biologist, British Antarctic Survey.
1981	John Edward Giles KERSHAW	To 1979. Aircraft Pilot, British Antarctic Survey.
1980	John Fergus ANCKORN	1973-74. Geologist, British Antarctic Survey.
1980	Peter Francis BUTLER	To 1974. Geophysicist, British Antarctic Survey.
1980	Julian Hartley PRIDDLE	1975-76. Freshwater Biologist, British Antarctic Survey.
1980	David Gordon SINGLETON	1972-73. Geologist, British Antarctic Survey.
1980	Martin Guy WHITE	To 1978. Marine Biologist, British Antarctic Survey.
1980	David Donaldson WYNN-WILLIAMS	1975-76. Microbiologist, British Antarctic Survey.

=== 1970s ===
Year	Recipient	Details
1979	Gregory HOFFMAN	1976. Senior Carpenter, Australian National Antarctic Research Expeditions.
1979	Geoffrey Francis MORGAN	1976. Plant Inspector, Australian National Antarctic Research Expeditions.
1979	Brian Gavin HARVEY	1977. Senior Diesel Mechanic, Australian National Antarctic Research Expeditions.
1979	Ian Lawrence MCINTOSH	1977. Physicist (Ionosphere), Australian National Antarctic Research Expeditions.
1979	Alan Douglas PARKER	1977. Officer-in-Charge, Australian National Antarctic Research Expeditions.
1979	Alan Normington COWAN,	1977. Medical Officer, Australian National Antarctic Research Expeditions.
1979	Barry William SEEDSMAN	1977. Officer-in-Charge, Australian National Antarctic Research Expeditions.
1979	Jeffrey Charles WILSON	1977. Glaciologist, Australian National Antarctic Research Expeditions.
1979	Victor George BARKELL	To 1978. Pilot, Australian National Antarctic Research Expeditions.
1979	Neal Warwick YOUNG	To 1977. Geologist, Australian National Antarctic Research Expeditions.
1979	Walter Brian HARLAND	To 1978. Glaciologist, geological exploration of Spitsbergen.
1979	Eric Kenneth Prentice BACK	1973-75. Meteorologist and Base Commander, British Antarctic Survey.
1979	Terence Michael WHITAKER	1971-73. Marine Biologist, British Antarctic Survey.
1978	Charles Michael BELL	1968-70. Geologist, British Antarctic Survey.
1978	Robert Walter BOSTELMANN	1972-73. Veterinary Surgeon, British Antarctic Survey.
1978	Frederick Michael BURNS	1968-70. Geophysicist, British Antarctic Survey.
1978	John Francis CARTER	1966-69. Diesel Mechanic, British Antarctic Survey.
1978	Thomas Gwynn DAVIES	1969-71. Geologist, British Antarctic Survey.
1978	Peter Hugh FITZGERALD	1971-73. Ionosphericist, British Antarctic Survey.
1978	David Donald William FLETCHER	1971-73. General Assistant, British Antarctic Survey.
1978	Paul William CURLING	1970-72. Surveyor, British Antarctic Survey.
1978	Michael Raymond PAWLEY	1971-72. General Assistant and Base Commander, British Antarctic Survey.
1978	Peter Alexander PRINCE,	1971-73. Biological Assistant, British Antarctic Survey.
1978	Ernest Brian SHELDON	To 1976. Meteorologist and General Assistant, and Base Commander, British Antarctic Survey.
1978	Alexander Gumming SKINNER	1968-70. Geologist, British Antarctic Survey.
1978	Alan SMITH	1966-67. General Assistant, British Antarctic Survey.
1978	Ian Flavell SMITH	1967-69. Geophysicist, British Antarctic Survey.
1978	Roger Charles Tindley,	1972-74. General Assistant, British Antarctic Survey.
1978	Andrew Chester WAGER,	To 1972. Glaciologist, British Antarctic Survey.
1978	Steven WORMALD	To 1973. Meteorologist and General Assistant, and Base Commander, British Antarctic Survey.
1976	Peter David Clarkson	1968-69. Geologist, British Antarctic Survey.
1976	Maurice John Cole	1960-72. Ship's Master, British Antarctic Survey.
1976	John Richard Dudeney	1967-68. Ionosphericist, British Antarctic Survey.
1976	William Alan Etchells	1967-68. Mechanic, British Antarctic Survey.
1976	Inigo Everson	1965-66. Marine Biologist, British Antarctic Survey.
1976	Richard Maitland Laws	1948-49. Biologist, British Antarctic Survey.
1976	Ronald Martin Lloyd	1966. Medical Officer, British Antarctic Survey.
1976	David William Matthews	1965-66. Geologist, British Antarctic Survey.
1976	Milne Murray Samuel	1965-66. Surveyor, British Antarctic Survey.
1976	Charles Graham Smith	1967-68. Geologist, British Antarctic Survey.
1976	Ronald Ian Lewis Smith	1966. Botanist, British Antarctic Survey.
1976	Robert Harold Thomas	1966-67. Glaciologist, British Antarctic Survey.
1976	Paul Ian Whiteman	1966. Engineer, British Antarctic Survey.
1976	Lawrence Edward Willey	1967-68. Geologist, British Antarctic Survey.
1976	Hugh Blackwell Evans	Posthumous (This award was recommended prior to his death) 1898-1900. Zoologist, Southern Cross Expedition.
1974	Joe Panipakuttuk	Posthumous. Silver. Arctic 1944. Presented 30 years after his participation in the St. Roch East-West transit of the Northwest Passage.
1974	Louis Edward MACEY	Clasp. 1971. Officer-in-Charge, MawsonStation.
1974	Ross McKenzie ANDERSON	1969. Glaciologist, Casey Station.
1974	Neil Leonard BRIGHTWELL	1968. Officer-in-Charge, Wilkes Station.
1974	William John CARTLEDGE	Plumber, Wilkes Station, 1962; Carpenter, Mawson Station, 1966; Senior Carpenter, Mawson Station, 1971.
1974	Maxwell John CORRY	Surveyor, Mawson Station, 1965; Officer-in-Charge and Glaciologist, Amery Station, 1968.
1974	John Oliver CRUISE	Miner, Mawson Station, 1971.
1974	Graeme James CURRIE	Radio Supervisor, Mawson Station, 1960; Supervising Technician (Radio), Wilkes Station, 1963 and 1967; Casey Station, 1969.
1974	Allan Laurence FOSTER	Electronics Engineer, MawsonStation, 1970.
1974	Stephen Richard HARBOUR	Senior Diesel Mechanic, Mawson Station, 1970 and 1971.
1974	Christopher Sladen HOPE	Electronics Engineer, Casey Station, 1971.
1974	Francis Robert JOHNSON	Radio Officer, Mawson Station, 1968; Radio Officer-in-Charge, Mawson Station, 1970.
1974	Raymond John MITCHELL	Mechanic-Driver, Wilkes Station, 1967; Senior Diesel Mechanic, Mawson Station, 1969.
1974	Robert Thomas NICHOLSON	Carpenter, Wilkes Station,1966; Senior Carpenter, Repstat (Casey), 1968; Senior Carpenter and Second-in-Charge, Mawson Station, 1970.
1974	Desmond Arthur Aloysius PARKER	Officer-in-Charge and Medical Officer, Davis Station, 1969.
1974	Maxwell Neil RUBELI	Surveyor, Mawson Station, 1968.
1974	Brian Paul RYDER	Radio Officer, Mawson Station, 1961; Wilkes Station, 1963 and 1965; Davis Station, 1971.
1974	Donald Franklin STYLES, M.B.E.	Assistant Director, Antarctic Division, Australian Department of External Affairs since 1957.
1974	Keith Douglas WATSON	Diesel Mechanic, Mawson Station, 1965; Senior Diesel Mechanic, Mawson Station, 1968; Plant Inspector, Mawson Station, 1970.
1972	Mr. Ian Philip JOHNSON	1963-74. New Zealand Expeditions to Antarctica.
1972	Harold Phillip LOWE	New Zealand Expeditions to Antarctica.
1972	William James WEBB	New Zealand Expeditions to Antarctica.
1971	Gordon Trevor BOWRA	1963-1964. Medical officer, British Antarctic Survey.
1971	Michael FLEET	1962-1963. Geologist, British Antarctic Survey.
1971	Ralph Ross HORNE	1963-1964. Geologist, British Antarctic Survey.
1971	Dudley Robert JEHAN	1963-1964. Meteorologist, British Antarctic Survey.
1971	Lewis Menne JUCKES	1964-1965. Geologist, British Antarctic Survey.
1971	Anthony Frank MARSH	1962-1964. Geologist, British Antarctic Survey.
1971	Hugh Magee O'GORMAN	1963-1964. Wireless Operator, British Antarctic Survey.
1971	Robert Geoffrey Boshier RENNER	1964. Geophysicist, British Antarctic Survey.
1971	Richard Frederick STOCKS	1964. Builder, British Antarctic Survey.
1971	Michael Robert Alexander THOMSON	1964-1965. Geologist, British Antarctic Survey.
1971	Thomas WOODFIELD	1955-1968. Master R.R.S.BRANSFIELD, British Antarctic Survey.
1971	Richard WORSFOLD	1963-1964. Geologist, British Antarctic Survey.

=== 1960s ===
Year	Recipient	Details
1969	Alastair Cameron BATTYE	Australian Expeditions to Antarctica.
1969	Stewart BELL, Royal Australian Air Force	Australian Expeditions to Antarctica.
1969	Kenneth Lyle BENNETT	Australian Expeditions to Antarctica.
1969	Ian George BIRD	Australian Expeditions to Antarctica.
1969	Henry Preston BLACK	Australian Expeditions to Antarctica.
1969	John BODA	Australian Expeditions to Antarctica.
1969	Grahame Murray BUDD	Australian Expeditions to Antarctica.
1969	William Francis BUDD	Australian Expeditions to Antarctica.
1969	John Richard CANHAM	Australian Expeditions to Antarctica.
1969	David Robert CARSTENS	Australian Expeditions to Antarctica.
1969	David Bevan CARTER	Australian Expeditions to Antarctica.
1969	Donald Francis CREIGHTON	Australian Expeditions to Antarctica.
1969	Robert Hugh EATHER	Australian Expeditions to Antarctica.
1969	William Walter EDWARD	Australian Expeditions to Antarctica.
1969	John Charles ELLIOTT	Australian Expeditions to Antarctica.
1969	Kevin Vincent FELTON, Royal Australian Air Force	Australian Expeditions to Antarctica.
1969	Noel Edwards FOLEY	Australian Expeditions to Antarctica.
1969	Mark James FORECAST	Australian Expeditions to Antarctica.
1969	Maurice John FREEMAN	Australian Expeditions to Antarctica.
1969	John Edward GIDDINGS	Australian Expeditions to Antarctica.
1969	James Ronald HARROP	Australian Expeditions to Antarctica.
1969	Malcolm HAY	Australian Expeditions to Antarctica.
1969	Kenneth Edward HICKS	Australian Expeditions to Antarctica.
1969	Geoffrey Charles HULCOMBE	Australian Expeditions to Antarctica.
1969	James Charles KICHENSIDE	Australian Expeditions to Antarctica.
1969	Malcolm KIRTON	Australian Expeditions to Antarctica.
1969	Ian Hamilton LANDON-SMITH	Australian Expeditions to Antarctica.
1969	Phillip Garth LAW	Australian Expeditions to Antarctica.
1969	Sydney George LITTLE	Australian Expeditions to Antarctica.
1969	Desmond James LUGG	Australian Expeditions to Antarctica.
1969	John McGHEE	Australian Expeditions to Antarctica.
1969	Peter James McGRATH	Australian Expeditions to Antarctica.
1969	William Allen McLAREN	Australian Expeditions to Antarctica.
1969	Raymond McMAHON	Australian Expeditions to Antarctica.
1969	John MANNING	Australian Expeditions to Antarctica.
1969	Cyril Victor MORGAN	Australian Expeditions to Antarctica.
1969	Raymond Arthur O'LEARY	Australian Expeditions to Antarctica.
1969	Trevor OLROG	Australian Expeditions to Antarctica.
1969	Peter Ivan ORMAY	Australian Expeditions to Antarctica.
1969	Murray Leigh PFITZNER	Australian Expeditions to Antarctica.
1969	Richard Anthony RUKER	Australian Expeditions to Antarctica.
1969	Richard Alan SAXTON	Australian Expeditions to Antarctica.
1969	Donald Lynton SEEDSMAN	Australian Expeditions to Antarctica.
1969	Kenneth John SHENNAN	Australian Expeditions to Antarctica.
1969	Neville Robert SMETHURST	Australian Expeditions to Antarctica.
1969	Geoffrey Denys Probyn SMITH	Australian Expeditions to Antarctica.
1969	Ivan Neville THOMAS	Australian Expeditions to Antarctica.
1969	Ian TOD	Australian Expeditions to Antarctica.
1969	David Scott TRAIL	Australian Expeditions to Antarctica.
1969	Norman Edward TROTT	Australian Expeditions to Antarctica.
1969	Kevin George WALKER	Australian Expeditions to Antarctica.
1969	Anthony WARRINER	Australian Expeditions to Antarctica.
1969	Gunter Ernest WELLER	Australian Expeditions to Antarctica.
1969	John Stanley Marsden WILLIAMS	Australian Expeditions to Antarctica.
1969	Edward Robert WISHART	Australian Expeditions to Antarctica.
1969	William Francis YOUNG	Australian Expeditions to Antarctica.
1969	Brian Casimir ZICHY-WOINARSKI	Australian Expeditions to Antarctica.
1969	Zdenck SOUCEK	Posthumous. Australian Expeditions to Antarctica.
1969	Albert Leon BURROWS	New Zealand Expeditions to Antarctica.
1969	Colin Maxwell CLARK	New Zealand Expeditions to Antarctica.
1969	Malcolm Roding James FORD	New Zealand Expeditions to Antarctica.
1969	James Francis GRAVESON	New Zealand Expeditions to Antarctica.
1969	Hilary John HARRINGTON	New Zealand Expeditions to Antarctica.
1969	Adrian Goodenough HAYTER	New Zealand Expeditions to Antarctica.
1969	Arnold John HEINE	New Zealand Expeditions to Antarctica.
1969	Walter William HERBERT	New Zealand Expeditions to Antarctica.
1969	Ronald William HEWSON	New Zealand Expeditions to Antarctica.
1969	Peter John HUNT	New Zealand Expeditions to Antarctica.
1969	Brian Maxwell JUDD	New Zealand Expeditions to Antarctica.
1969	Geoffrey Alan Munro KING	New Zealand Expeditions to Antarctica.
1969	Arthur George LEWIS	New Zealand Expeditions to Antarctica.
1969	William Raymond LOGIE	New Zealand Expeditions to Antarctica.
1969	David Reginald Cecil LOWE	New Zealand Expeditions to Antarctica.
1969	William Robert LUCY	New Zealand Expeditions to Antarctica.
1969	David Graham MASSAM	New Zealand Expeditions to Antarctica.
1969	Garth John MATTERSON	New Zealand Expeditions to Antarctica.
1969	Peter Miles OTWAY	New Zealand Expeditions to Antarctica.
1969	Kevin Patrick PAIN	New Zealand Expeditions to Antarctica.
1969	Michael Maynard PREBBLE	New Zealand Expeditions to Antarctica.
1969	Athol Renouf ROBERTS	New Zealand Expeditions to Antarctica.
1969	Kenneth James SALMON	New Zealand Expeditions to Antarctica.
1969	Brian Philip SANDFORD	New Zealand Expeditions to Antarctica.
1969	Maurice James SHEEHAN	New Zealand Expeditions to Antarctica.
1969	Robert Baden THOMSON	New Zealand Expeditions to Antarctica.
1969	Keith Charles WISE	New Zealand Expeditions to Antarctica.
1969	Peter Alexander YEATES	New Zealand Expeditions to Antarctica.
1969	Rutherglen Murray ROBB	Posthumous. New Zealand Expeditions to Antarctica.
1969	Allan GILL	British Trans-Arctic Expedition 1968-69.
1969	Kenneth Hurrell HEDGES	British Trans-Arctic Expedition 1968-69.
1969	Walter William HERBERT	2nd Clasp. British Trans-Arctic Expedition 1968-69.
1969	Roy Martindale KOERNER	British Trans-Arctic Expedition 1968-69.
1967	Jeremy Thomas BAILEY	Posthumous. 1965. Physicist. British Antarctic Survey.
1967	David Peter WILD	Posthumous. 1964-1965. Surveyor, British Antarctic Survey.
1967	John Kershaw WILSON	Posthumous. 1965. Medical Officer, British Antarctic Survey.
1967	Neil AITKENHEAD	1960-1961. Geologist, British Antarctic Survey.
1967	Adrian ALLEN	1960-1961. Geophysicist, British Antarctic Survey.
1967	Dennis Alexander ARDUS	1960-1961. Glaciologist, British Antarctic Survey.
1967	Samuel Charles Bernard BLAKE	1956-1958, 1961-1963. Wireless Operator Mechanic, British Antarctic Survey.
1967	Peter Robert BOND	1960-1962. Pilot, British Antarctic Survey.
1967	Howard Edward CHAPMAN	1960-1962. Surveyor, British Antarctic Survey.
1967	John Crabbe CUNNINGHAM	1955-1956, 1960-1965. Base Leader and General Assistant, British Antarctic Survey.
1967	Noel Yorston DOWNHAM	1959-1964. General Assistant and Base Leader, British Antarctic Survey.
1967	Kenneth Anthony EDWARDS	1961-1963. Surveyor, British Antarctic Survey.
1967	David Hawksley ELLIOT	1961-1963. Geologist, British Antarctic Survey.
1967	Ian Ledgard FOTHERGILL	1959-1962. Meteorologist and Base Leader, British Antarctic Survey.
1967	Arthur Gilmour FRASER	1960-1961. Geologist, British Antarctic Survey.
1967	Ronald Barry HEYWOOD	1961-1963. Zoologist, British Antarctic Survey.
1967	Benjamin HODGES	1961-1963. Field Assistant, British Antarctic Survey.
1967	Colin JOHNSON	1957-1958, 1960-1961. Wireless Operator and Base Leader, British Antarctic Survey.
1967	Peter KENNETT	1962-1963. Geophysicist, British Antarctic Survey.
1967	George Kennedy MACLEOD	1956-1958, 1961-1963. General Assistant and Base Leader, British Antarctic Survey.
1967	Robert John METCALFE	1960-1963. Surveyor, British Antarctic Survey.
1967	Philip Humphrey Hardwick NELSON	1960-1961. Geologist, British Antarctic Survey.
1967	Lionel James SHIRTCLIFFE	1954-1955, 1961-1963. Meteorological and General Assistant, and Base Leader, British Antarctic Survey.
1967	Maurice Reginald SUMNER	1959-1963. Meteorologist and Base Leader, British Antarctic Survey.
1967	Thomas Robert SUMNER	1960-1961. Aircraft Fitter, British Antarctic Survey.
1967	Brian James TAYLOR	1961-1962. Geologist, British Antarctic Survey.
1967	Peter John TILBROOK	1961-1963. Zoologist and Base Leader, British Antarctic Survey.
1967	Ronald TINDAL	1958-1960, 1962-1964. General Assistant, British Antarctic Survey.
1967	Alan Frederic WRIGHT	1961-1963. Surveyor, British Antarctic Survey.
1967	Robert Roy EDWARDS	1964 to 1966. In recognition of his hazardous flying duties in support of the Royal Naval and British Antarctic Surveys.
1963	Stanley Edward Black	Posthumous. 1956-1958. Meteorologist, Falkland Islands Dependencies Survey.
1963	David Statham	Posthumous. 1957-1958. Meteorologist, Falkland Islands Dependencies Survey.
1963	Geoffrey Stride	Posthumous. 1957-1958. Mechanic, Falkland Islands Dependencies Survey.
1963	Angus Bruce Erskine	Clasp. 1956-58. Base Leader and Surveyor, Falkland Islands Dependencies Survey.
1963	Charles Frank Le Feuvre	Clasp. 1958-1961. Wireless Operator, Falkland Islands Dependencies Survey.
1963	Michael James Blackwell	1959-1960. Senior Scientific Officer, Falkland Islands Dependencies Survey.
1963	Robin Curtis	1957-58. Geologist, Falkland Islands Dependencies Survey.
1963	Anthony Graham Davies	1958-1961. Medical Officer, Falkland Islands Dependencies Survey.
1963	Joseph Charles Farman	1956-1959. Senior Physicist and BaseLeader, Falkland Islands Dependencies Survey.
1963	Brian Leonard Hodson Foote	1957-1959. Surveyor and BaseLeader, Falkland Islands Dependencies Survey.
1963	Peter Derek Forster	1957-1959. Surveyor and Base Leader, Falkland Islands Dependencies Survey.
1963	Peter McCausland Gibbs	1957-1959. Surveyor and Base Leader, Falkland Islands Dependencies Survey.
1963	Denis Charles Goldring	1957-1959. Geologist, Falkland Islands Dependencies Survey.
1963	Peter Hugh Grimley	1960-1961. Geologist, Falkland Islands Dependencies Survey.
1963	Ian Francis Glynne Hampton	1958-1961. Physiologist, Falkland Islands Dependencies Survey.
1963	Bryan Holmes	1957-1958. Surveyor, Falkland Islands Dependencies Survey.
1963	Arthur Keith Hoskins	1957-1960. Geologist, Falkland Islands Dependencies Survey.
1963	Captain William Johnstone	1950-1961. Master of the R.R.S.John Biscoe, Falkland Islands Dependencies Survey.
1963	Roy Martindale Koerner	1957-1960. Senior Meteorologist and Glaciologist, Falkland Islands Dependencies Survey.
1963	Donald McCalma,	1957-1960. Base Leader and Surveyor, Falkland Islands Dependencies Survey.
1963	Ronald Miller,	1956-1958. General Assistant and Base Leader, Falkland Islands Dependencies Survey.
1963	William Mitchell	1958-1961. Diesel Electrical Mechanic, Falkland Islands Dependencies Survey.
1963	Cyril Aubrey Murray	1958-1961. Surveyor and Base Leader, Falkland Islands Dependencies Survey.
1963	Neil Wallace Morison Orr	1958-1961. Medical Officer and Base Leader, Falkland Islands Dependencies Survey.
1963	Brinley Richard Roberts	1956-1959. Wireless Operator, Falkland Islands Dependencies Survey.
1963	Hugh Walter Simpson	1956-1958. Medical Officer, Falkland Islands Dependencies Survey.
1963	Henry Turner Wyatt	1957-1959. Medical Officer, Falkland Islands Dependencies Survey.
1961	Alfred Amphlett	Senior Diesel Engineer, Royal Society Antarctic Expedition for the International Geophysical Year.
1961	Leslie William Barclay	Member of Ionospheric Group, Royal Society Antarctic Expedition for the International Geophysical Year.
1961	William Henry Bellchambers	Leader of Ionospheric Group, Royal Society Antarctic Expedition for the International Geophysical Year.
1961	Ivor Christopher Beney	Diesel Engineer, Royal Society Antarctic Expedition for the International Geophysical Year.
1961	Andrew Blackie	Meteorologist, Royal Society Antarctic Expedition for the International Geophysical Year.
1961	Philip Michael Brenan	Astronomer, Royal Society Antarctic Expedition for the International Geophysical Year.
1961	Bertram Kier Brooker	Medical Officer, Royal Society Antarctic Expedition for the International Geophysical Year.
1961	James Michael Crowther Burton	Meteorologist, Royal Society Antarctic Expedition for the International Geophysical Year.
1961	David Lawrence Morton Cansfield.	Member of Ionospheric Group, Royal Society Antarctic Expedition for the International Geophysical Year.
1961	Leonard Constantine	Assistant Cook, Royal Society Antarctic Expedition for the International Geophysical Year.
1961	Henry Edward George Dyer	Senior Wireless Operator, Royal Society Antarctic Expedition for the International Geophysical Year.
1961	Malcolm John Edwards	Senior Cook, Royal Society Antarctic Expedition for the International Geophysical Year.
1961	Bernard Godfrey Ellis	Meteorologist, Royal Society Antarctic Expedition for the International Geophysical Year.
1961	Edward John Gane	Senior Wireless Mechanic, Royal Society Antarctic Expedition for the International Geophysical Year.
1961	David Pratt Harrison	Astronomer, Royal Society Antarctic Expedition for the International Geophysical Year.
1961	Joseph MacDowall	Leader and Meteorologist, Royal Society Antarctic Expedition for the International Geophysical Year.
1961	John Appleton Smith	Meteorologist, Royal Society Antarctic Expedition for the International Geophysical Year.
1961	Gwynne Meyler Thomas	Auroral Physicist, Royal Society Antarctic Expedition for the International Geophysical Year.
1961	David Thomas Tribble	Meteorologist, Royal Society Antarctic Expedition for the International Geophysical Year.
1961	Derek George Ward	Meteorologist, Royal Society Antarctic Expedition for the International Geophysical Year.
1961	Douglas Walter Leckie	1956. Pilot, Mawson, Australian National Antarctic Research Expedition to Mawson.
1961	Hugh Overend Wilson	1958. Pilot, Mawson, Australian National Antarctic Research Expedition to Mawson and Davis.
1961	Peter Wylie King	Second Clasp. 1958. Radio Officer, Mawson, Australian National Antarctic Research Expedition to Mawson and Davis.
1961	Royston Reginald Arnel	Clasp. 1958. Geophysical Assistant, Mawson, Australian National Antarctic Research Expedition to Mawson and Davis.
1961	Frederick Winton Elliott	Clasp. 1958. Weather Observer, Davis and Mawson, Australian National Antarctic Research Expedition to Mawson and Davis.
1961	Lionel George Gardner	Clasp. 1958. Diesel Mechanic, Davis, Australian National Antarctic Research Expedition to Mawson and Davis.
1961	Ian Leonard Adams	1958. Officer-in-Charge, Mawson, Australian National Antarctic Research Expedition to Mawson and Davis.
1961	James Blair	1958. Senior Diesel Mechanic, Mawson, Australian National Antarctic Research Expedition to Mawson and Davis.
1961	John Roger Blake	1958. Auroral Physicist, Mawson, Australian National Antarctic Research Expedition to Mawson and Davis.
1961	Alfons Bolza	1958. Weather Observer, Mawson, Australian National Antarctic Research Expedition to Mawson and Davis.
1961	Raymond Alexander Borland	1958. Meteorologist, Mawson, Australian National Antarctic Research Expedition to Mawson and Davis.
1961	Duncan Alexander Brown	1958. Radio Operator, Mawson, Australian National Antarctic Research Expedition to Mawson and Davis.
1961	Eric John Burnett	1958. Physicist, Mawson, Australian National Antarctic Research Expedition to Mawson and Davis.
1961	Dr. James Edward Gray Channon	1958. Medical Officer, Mawson, Australian National Antarctic Research Expedition to Mawson and Davis.
1961	Philip Kenyon Chapman	1958. Auroral Physicist, Mawson, Australian National Antarctic Research Expedition to Mawson and Davis.
1961	Bruce Graydon Cook	1958. Geophysicist, Mawson, Australian National Antarctic Research Expedition to Mawson and Davis.
1961	Graham Kent Downer	1958. Electrical Fitter, Mawson, Australian National Antarctic Research Expedition to Mawson and Davis.
1961	Desmond John Evans	1958. Diesel Mechanic, Mawson, Australian National Antarctic Research Expedition to Mawson and Davis.
1961	Henri Jean-Louis Fischer	1958. Cook, Mawson, Australian National Antarctic Research Expedition to Mawson and Davis.
1961	Maxwell John Flutter	1958. Weather Observer, Davis and Mawson, Australian National Antarctic Research Expedition to Mawson and Davis.
1961	Ivan Laurence Grove	1958. Pilot, Mawson, Australian National Antarctic Research Expedition to Mawson and Davis.
1961	Eric Edwin Jesson	1958. Seismic Geophysicist, Mawson, Australian National Antarctic Research Expedition to Mawson and Davis.
1961	Graham Alexander Knuckey	1958. Surveyor, Mawson, Australian National Antarctic Research Expedition to Mawson and Davis.
1961	Ian Roderick McLeod	1958. Geologist, Mawson, Australian National Antarctic Research Expedition to Mawson and Davis.
1961	Ossie Maguire	1958. Radio Technician, Davis and Mawson, Australian National Antarctic Research Expedition to Mawson and Davis.
1961	Stuart Aubrey Manning	1958. Air Frame Fitter, Mawson, Australian National Antarctic Research Expedition to Mawson and Davis.
1961	Robert Eric Thomas Oldfield	1958. Radio Officer, Mawson, Australian National Antarctic Research Expedition to Mawson and Davis.
1961	Alan Keith Richardson	1958. Engine Fitter, Davis and Mawson, Australian National Antarctic Research Expedition to Mawson and Davis.
1961	Frank Aswell Smith	1958. Diesel Mechanic, Mawson, Australian National Antarctic Research Expedition to Mawson and Davis.
1961	Elliott Sydney Trigwell	1958. Radio Supervisor, Davis, Australian National Antarctic Research Expedition to Mawson and Davis.
1961	Peter Albert Trost	1958. Cosmic Ray Physicist, Mawson, Australian National Antarctic Research Expedition to Mawson and Davis.
1961	Helmut Tschaffert	1958. Weather Observer, Mawson, Australian National Antarctic Research Expedition to Mawson and Davis.
1961	Peter Bryan Turner	1958. Weather Observer/Radio Operator, Davis, Australian National Antarctic Research Expedition to Mawson and Davis.
1961	Dudley Raymond Twigg	1958. Radio Supervisor, Mawson, Australian National Antarctic Research Expedition to Mawson and Davis.
1960	William Robert John DINGLE	Clasp. Officer-in-Charge, Davis, Australian National Antarctic Research Expedition to Mawson and Davis.
1960	Peter Wylie KING	Clasp. 1958. Radio Officer, Mawson, Australian National Antarctic Research Expedition to Mawson and Davis.
1960	Nils Tender LIED	Clasp. 1957. Weather Observer and Assistant Radio Officer, Davis, Australian National Antarctic Research Expedition to Mawson and Davis.
1960	Bruce Harry STINEAR	Clasp. 1957. Geologist, Davis and Mawson, Australian National Antarctic Research Expedition to Mawson and Davis.
1960	Royston Reginald ARNEL	1957. Radio Officer, Mawson, Australian National Antarctic Research Expedition to Mawson and Davis.
1960	Peter Hugh CLEMENCE	1957. Senior Pilot, Mawson, Australian National Antarctic Research Expedition to Mawson and Davis.
1960	Neville Joseph COLLINS	1957. Senior Diesel Mechanic, Mawson, Australian National Antarctic Research Expedition to Mawson and Davis.
1960	Ephraim David FIELD	1957. Cook, Mawson, Australian National Antarctic Research Expedition to Mawson and Davis.
1960	Morris Maxwell FISHER	1957. Surveyor, Mawson, Australian National Antarctic Research Expedition to Mawson and Davis.
1960	Morley James GOODSPEED	1957. Seismic Geophysicist, Mawson, Australian National Antarctic Research Expedition to Mawson and Davis.
1960	Francis Thomas HANNAN	1957. Weather Officer, Mawson, Australian National Antarctic Research Expedition to Mawson and Davis.
1960	Alan Charles HAWKER	1957. Radio Supervisor, Davis, Australian National Antarctic Research Expedition to Mawson and Davis.
1960	Bernard IZABELLE	1957. Weather Observer, Mawson, Australian National Antarctic Research Expedition to Mawson and Davis.
1960	David Hubert JOHNS	1957. Cosmic Ray Physicist, Mawson, Australian National Antarctic Research Expedition to Mawson and Davis.
1960	Douglas Malcolm JOHNSTON	1957. Second Pilot, Mawson, Australian National Antarctic Research Expedition to Mawson and Davis.
1960	Reginald Thomas LEE	1957. Diesel Mechanic, Mawson, Australian National Antarctic Research Expedition to Mawson and Davis.
1960	William Charles LUCAS	1957. Diesel Mechanic, Davis, Australian National Antarctic Research Expedition to Mawson and Davis.
1960	Keith Benson MATHER	1957. Physicist-in-Charge, Mawson, Australian National Antarctic Research Expedition to Mawson and Davis.
1960	Malcolm MELLOR	1957. Glaciologist, Mawson, Australian National Antarctic Research Expedition to Mawson and Davis.
1960	Neville Windeyer MEREDITH	1957. Engine Fitter, Mawson, Australian National Antarctic Research Expedition to Mawson and Davis.
1960	Carl Sigurd NILSSON	1957. Radio Physicist, Mawson, Australian National Antarctic Research Expedition to Mawson and Davis.
1960	Richard Ronald PICKERING	1957. Airframe Fitter, Mawson, Australian National Antarctic Research Expedition to Mawson and Davis.
1960	John David PINN	1957. Geophysicist, Mawson, Australian National Antarctic Research Expedition to Mawson and Davis.
1960	Alexander Hardie SANDILANDS	1957. Radio Officer, Mawson, Australian National Antarctic Research Expedition to Mawson and Davis.
1960	Bernard Edward SHAW	1957. Radio Supervisor, Mawson, Australian National Antarctic Research Expedition to Mawson and Davis.
1960	John Eric SHAW	1957. Radio Physicist, Mawson, Australian National Antarctic Research Expedition to Mawson and Davis.
1960	Graeme Trevor WHEELER	1957. Weather Observer, Mawson, Australian National Antarctic Research Expedition to Mawson and Davis.
1960	Richard Lyall WILLING	1957. Medical Officer, Mawson, Australian National Antarctic Research Expedition to Mawson and Davis.

=== 1950s ===
Year	Recipient	Details
1958	Murdo Finlayson TAIT	Clasp. Silver. Antarctic 1955. Meteorological Observer, HopeBay.
1958	William Ellery ANDERSON	Antarctic 1955. Base Leader and Meteorologist, Hope Bay.
1958	Donald ATKINSON	Antarctic 1955. Diesel Electric Mechanic, Horseshoe Island.
1958	James Arthur EXLEY	Antarctic 1955. Geologist, Horseshoe Island.
1958	Peter Ralph HOOPER	Antarctic 1955. Base Leader and Geologist, Anvers Island.
1958	Norman Arthur George LEPPARD	Antarctic 1954-55. Assistant Surveyor, Hope Bay.
1958	Derek John Hatherill SEARLE	Antarctic 1955. Surveyor, Horseshoe Island.
1958	Robert Julian Faussitt TAYLOR	Antarctic 1954-55. Dog Physiologist, Hope Bay.
1958	Ronald Francis WORSWICK	Antarctic 1955. Meteorologist, Hope Bay.
1958	Kenneth AMY	Carpenter, Royal Society Antarctic Expedition for the International Geophysical Year 1957-1958.
1958	Ronald EVANS	Senior Wireless Operator, Royal Society Antarctic Expedition for the International Geophysical Year 1957-1958.
1958	Leslie Frederick MORRIS	Carpenter, Royal Society Antarctic Expedition for the International Geophysical Year 1957-1958.
1958	Robin Arthur SMART	Leader and Medical Officer, Royal Society Antarctic Expedition for the International Geophysical Year 1957-1958.
1958	Vemon Bruce GERARD	New Zealand Antarctic Expedition for the International Geophysical Year 1957-1958.
1958	Trevor HATHERTON	New Zealand Antarctic Expedition for the International Geophysical Year 1957-1958.
1958	John Gerard HUMPHRIES	New Zealand Antarctic Expedition for the International Geophysical Year 1957-1958.
1958	Clayton Ernest INGHAM	New Zealand Antarctic Expedition for the International Geophysical Year 1957-1958.
1958	Michael William LANGEVAD	New Zealand Antarctic Expedition for the International Geophysical Year 1957-1958.
1958	William James Peter MACDONALD	New Zealand Antarctic Expedition for the International Geophysical Year 1957-1958.
1958	Reginald Herbert ORR	New Zealand Antarctic Expedition for the International Geophysical Year 1957-1958.
1958	Herbert Neil SANDFORD	New Zealand Antarctic Expedition for the International Geophysical Year 1957-1958.
1958	Kenneth Victor BLAIKLOCK	2nd Clasp. Antarctic 1956-1958. Commonwealth Trans-Antarctic Expedition.
1958	Vivian Ernest FUCHS	Clasp. Antarctic 1956-1958. Commonwealth Trans-Antarctic Expedition.
1958	Richard BROOKE	Clasp. Antarctic 1956-1958. Commonwealth Trans-Antarctic Expedition.
1958	Desmond Edgar Lemnal HOMARD	Clasp. Antarctic 1956-1958. Commonwealth Trans-Antarctic Expedition.
1958	Harold LISTER	Clasp. Antarctic 1956-1958. Commonwealth Trans-Antarctic Expedition.
1958	George Walter MARSH	Clasp. Antarctic 1956-1958. Commonwealth Trans-Antarctic Expedition.
1958	David George STRATTON	Clasp. Antarctic 1956-1958. Commonwealth Trans-Antarctic Expedition.
1958	Edmund Percival HILLARY	Antarctic 1956-1958. Commonwealth Trans-Antarctic Expedition.
1958	Harry Herbert AYRES	Antarctic 1956-1958. Commonwealth Trans-Antarctic Expedition.
1958	Ronald Walter BALHAM	Antarctic 1956-1958. Commonwealth Trans-Antarctic Expedition.
1958	James Gordon BATES	Antarctic 1956-1958. Commonwealth Trans-Antarctic Expedition.
1958	Ernest Selwyn BUCKNELL	Antarctic 1956-1958. Commonwealth Trans-Antarctic Expedition.
1958	Roy Albert CARLYON	Antarctic 1956-1958. Commonwealth Trans-Antarctic Expedition.
1958	John Richard CLAYDON	Antarctic 1956-1958. Commonwealth Trans-Antarctic Expedition.
1958	William Joseph CRANFIELD	Antarctic 1956-1958. Commonwealth Trans-Antarctic Expedition.
1958	Murray Hamilton DOUGLAS	Antarctic 1956-1958. Commonwealth Trans-Antarctic Expedition.
1958	Murray Roland ELLIS	Antarctic 1956-1958. Commonwealth Trans-Antarctic Expedition.
1958	John Edward GAWN	Antarctic 1956-1958. Commonwealth Trans-Antarctic Expedition.
1958	Rainer GOLDSMITH	Antarctic 1956-1958. Commonwealth Trans-Antarctic Expedition.
1958	Bernard Maurice GUNN	Antarctic 1956-1958. Commonwealth Trans-Antarctic Expedition.
1958	Gordon Murray HASLOP	Antarctic 1956-1958. Commonwealth Trans-Antarctic Expedition.
1958	Peter Harry JEFFRIES	Antarctic 1956-1958. Commonwealth Trans-Antarctic Expedition.
1958	Johannes Jacobus LA GRANGE	Antarctic 1956-1958. Commonwealth Trans-Antarctic Expedition.
1958	Ralph Anthony LENTON	Antarctic 1956-1958. Commonwealth Trans-Antarctic Expedition.
1958	John Harding LEWIS	Antarctic 1956-1958. Commonwealth Trans-Antarctic Expedition.
1958	Wallace George LOWE	Antarctic 1956-1958. Commonwealth Trans-Antarctic Expedition.
1958	Joseph Holmes MILLER	Antarctic 1956-1958. Commonwealth Trans-Antarctic Expedition.
1958	Peter David MULGREW	Antarctic 1956-1958. Commonwealth Trans-Antarctic Expedition.
1958	David Lynn PRATT	Antarctic 1956-1958. Commonwealth Trans-Antarctic Expedition.
1958	John Geoffrey Drewe PRATT	Antarctic 1956-1958. Commonwealth Trans-Antarctic Expedition.
1958	Allan Frederick ROGERS	Antarctic 1956-1958. Commonwealth Trans-Antarctic Expedition.
1958	Philip Jon STEPHENSON	Antarctic 1956-1958. Commonwealth Trans-Antarctic Expedition.
1958	Reginald Horace Anthony STEWART	Antarctic 1956-1958. Commonwealth Trans-Antarctic Expedition.
1958	Laurence Walter TARR	Antarctic 1956-1958. Commonwealth Trans-Antarctic Expedition.
1958	Guyon WARREN	Antarctic 1956-1958. Commonwealth Trans-Antarctic Expedition.
1958	Peter WESTON	Antarctic 1956-1958. Commonwealth Trans-Antarctic Expedition.
1958	Ellis WILLIAMS	Antarctic 1956-1958. Commonwealth Trans-Antarctic Expedition.
1958	Gordon Lindsay ABBS	Antarctic 1956. Radio Officer, Australian National Antarctic Research Expedition to Mawson.
1958	Patrick Neil ALBION	Antarctic 1956. Radio Officer, Australian National Antarctic Research Expedition to Mawson.
1958	William Gordon BEWSHER	Antarctic 1956. Officer-in-Chiarge, Australian National Antarctic Research Expedition to Mawson.
1958	John Stuart BUNT	Antarctic 1956. Biologist, Australian National Antarctic Research Expedition to Mawson.
1958	Mervyn Valdamar CHRISTENSEN	Antarctic 1956. Meteorological Observer, Australian National Antarctic Research Expedition to Mawson.
1958	Noel Munro COOPER	Antarctic 1956. Diesel Mechanic, Australian National Antarctic Research Expedition to Mawson.
1958	Donald Alexander DOWIE	Antarctic 1956. Medical Officer, Australian National Antarctic Research Expedition to Mawson.
1958	Lionel George GARDNER	Antarctic 1956. Senior Diesel Mechanic, Australian National Antarctic Research Expedition to Mawson.
1958	John Alfred HOLLINGSHEAD,	Antarctic 1956. Radio Technician, Australian National Antarctic Research Expedition to Mawson.
1958	Robin Mainwaring JACKLYN	Antarctic 1956. Physicist, Australian National Antarctic Research Expedition to Mawson.
1958	Geoffrey Raymond JOHANSEN	Antarctic 1956., Airframe Fitter, Australian National Antarctic Research Expedition to Mawson.
1958	Sydney Lorrimar KIRKBY	Antarctic 1956. Surveyor, Australian National Antarctic Research Expedition to Mawson.
1958	Nils Tonder LIED	Antarctic 1956. Meteorological Observer, Australian National Antarctic Research Expedition to Mawson.
1958	John Alexander MACKENZIE	Antarctic 1956. Cook, Australian National Antarctic Research Expedition to Mawson.
1958	James William Parker MCCARTHY	Antarctic 1956. Meteorologist, Australian National Antarctic Research Expedition to Mawson.
1958	Peter Malcolm MCGREGOR	Antarctic 1956. Geophysicist, Australian National Antarctic Research Expedition to Mawson.
1958	John Alex SEATON	Antarctic 1956. Second Pilot, Australian National Antarctic Research Expedition to Mawson.
1958	Gerald Joseph SUNDBERG	Antarctic 1956. Engine Fitter, Australian National Antarctic Research Expedition to Mawson.
1957	David Geoffrey DALGLIESH	Clasp. Antarctic 1956. Leader and Medical Officer, Advance Party of the Royal Society Antarctic Expedition for the International Geophysical Year.
1957	Kenneth Ernest Charles POWELL	Clasp. Antarctic 1956. Senior Diesel Mechanic, Advance Party of the Royal Society Antarctic Expedition for the International Geophysical Year.
1957	Angus Robin Franklin DALGLIESH	Antarctic 1956. General Duties, Advance Party of the Royal Society Antarctic Expedition for the International Geophysical Year.
1957	Stanley EVANS	Antarctic 1956. Scientist, Advance Party of the Royal Society Antarctic Expedition for the International Geophysical Year.
1957	Frank LE FEUVRE	Antarctic 1956. Wireless Operator, Advance Party of the Royal Society Antarctic Expedition for the International Geophysical Year.
1957	David William Sharper LIMBERT	Antarctic 1956. Meteorologist, Advance Party of the Royal Society Antarctic Expedition for the International Geophysical Year.
1957	George Ronald LUSH	Antarctic 1956. General Mechanical Engineer, Advance Party of the Royal Society Antarctic Expedition for the International Geophysical Year.
1957	Douglas Roland Otway PRIOR	Antarctic 1956. Carpenter, Advance Party of the Royal Society Antarctic Expedition for the International Geophysical Year.
1957	John East RAYMOND	Antarctic 1956. Senior Carpenter, Advance Party of the Royal Society Antarctic Expedition for the International Geophysical Year.
1957	George Ernest WATSON	Antarctic 1956. Chief Scientist, Advance Party of the Royal Society Antarctic Expedition for the International Geophysical Year.
1956	Robert William ALLISON	Antarctic 1955 to 1956. Australian National Antarctic Research Expedition to Mawson.
1956	John Mayston BECHERVAISE	Antarctic 1955 to 1956. Officer-in-Charge, Australian National Antarctic Research Expedition to Mawson.
1956	Peter W. CROHN	Antarctic 1955 to 1956. Geologist, Australian National Antarctic Research Expedition to Mawson.
1956	Frederick Winton ELLIOTT	Antarctic 1955 to 1956. Meteorological Observer, Australian National Antarctic Research Expedition to Mawson.
1956	Alan Stanley GOWLETT	Antarctic 1955 to 1956. Engineer, Australian National Antarctic Research Expedition to Mawson.
1956	Leon Neville Eugene JENNINGS-FOX	Antarctic 1955 to 1956. Meteorological Observer, Australian National Antarctic Research Expedition to Mawson.
1956	Robert Harding LACEY	Antarctic 1955 to 1956. surveyor, Australian National Antarctic Research Expedition to Mawson.
1956	Eric Leslie MACKLIN, Radio Telegraphist	Antarctic 1955 to 1956. Radio Telegraphist, Australian National Antarctic Research Expedition to Mawson.
1956	Richard George McNAIR	Antarctic 1955 to 1956. Cook, Australian National Antarctic Research Expedition to Mawson.
1956	Wilfrid Hugh OLDHAM	Antarctic 1955 to 1956. Geophysicist, Australian National Antarctic Research Expedition to Mawson.
1956	Neville Ronsley PARSONS	Antarctic 1955 to 1956. Physicist, Australian National Antarctic Research Expedition to Mawson.
1956	Alfred Davidson RIDDELL	Antarctic 1955 to 1956. Carpenter, Australian National Antarctic Research Expedition to Mawson.
1956	Peter John Randall SHAW	Antarctic 1955 to 1956. Meteorologist, Australian National Antarctic Research Expedition to Mawson.
1956	Frits Adriaan VAN HULSSEN	Antarctic 1955 to 1956. Radio Technician, Australian National Antarctic Research Expedition to Mawson.
1956	John Livingstone WARD	Antarctic 1955 to 1956. Radio Telegraphist, Australian National Antarctic Research Expedition to Mawson.
1956	Alan William REECE	Clasp. Antarctic 1950-1952. Geologist, Norwegian—British—Swedish Antarctic Expedition.
1956	John Ellis JELBART	Posthumous. Antarctic 1951. Physicist, Norwegian—British—Swedish Antarctic Expedition.
1956	Arthur QUAR	Antarctic 1950-1951. Radio Technician, Norwegian—British—Swedish Antarctic Expedition.
1956	Gordon de Quetteville ROBIN	Antarctic 1950-1952. Senior Physicist, Norwegian—British—Swedish Antarctic Expedition.
1956	Ernest Frederick ROOTS	Antarctic Senior Geologist, 1950-1952. Norwegian—British—Swedish Antarctic Expedition.
1956	Charles SWITHINBANK	Antarctic 1950-1952. Glaciologist, Norwegian—British—Swedish Antarctic Expedition.
1956	Robert George DOVERS	Clasp. Antarctic 1954-1955. Leader and Surveyor, Australian National Antarctic Research Expedition to Mawson.
1956	William Robert John DINGLE	Antarctic 1954-1955. Meteorologist, Australian National Antarctic Research Expedition to Mawson.
1956	Jeffrey Desmond GLEADELL	Antarctic 1954-1955. Cook, Australian National Antarctic Research Expedition to Mawson.
1956	William HARVEY	Antarctic 1954-1955. Carpenter, Australian National Antarctic Research Expedition to Mawson.
1956	Lewis Edward MACEY	Antarctic 1954-1955. Technical Superintendent, Australian National Antarctic Research Expedition to Mawson.
1956	John RUSSELL	Antarctic 1954-1955. Engineer, Australian National Antarctic Research Expedition to Mawson.
1956	Bruce Harry STINEAR	Antarctic 1954-1955. Geologist, Australian National Antarctic Research Expedition to Mawson.
1956	William John STORER	Antarctic 1954-1955. Wireless Telegraphist, Australian National Antarctic Research Expedition to Mawson.
1956	Robert Olveston SUMMERS	Antarctic 1954-1955. Medical Officer and Biologist, Australian National Antarctic Research Expedition to Mawson.
1955	Kenneth Victor BLAIKLOCK	Clasp. Antarctic 1952-1953. Surveyor, Hope Bay, Falkland Islands Dependencies Survey.
1955	Geoffrey Herbert BROOKFIELD	Antarctic 1953-1954. Meteorological Observer, Hope Bay, Falkland Islands Dependencies Survey.
1955	John Allen COLEY	Antarctic 1952-1953. Meteorological Assistant, Hope Bay, Falkland Islands Dependencies Survey.
1955	Ernest William Bruce HILL	Antarctic 1952. Diesel Electric Mechanic, Hope Bay, Falkland Islands Dependencies Survey.
1955	Brian David HUNT	Antarctic 1952. Meteorological Assistant, Hope Bay, Falkland Islands Dependencies Survey.
1955	Brian KEMP	Antarctic 1952-1953. Meteorological Assistant, Hope Bay, Falkland Islands Dependencies Survey.
1955	Peter Wylie KING	Antarctic 1952-1953. Wireless Operator Mechanic, HopeBay, Falkland Islands Dependencies Survey.
1955	George Walter MARSH	Antarctic 1952-1953. Base Leader and Medical Officer, Hope Bay, Falkland Islands Dependencies Survey.
1955	Kenneth Ernest Charles POWELL	Antarctic 1953-1954. Diesel Electric Mechanic, Hope Bay, Falkland Islands Dependencies Survey.
1955	Anthony John STANDRING	Antarctic 1953-1954. Geologist, Hope Bay, Falkland Islands Dependencies Survey.
1955	Robert STONELEY	Antarctic 1952. Geologist, Hope Bay, Falkland Islands Dependencies Survey.
1955	David George STRATTON	Antarctic 1952-1953. Assistant Surveyor, Hope Bay, Falkland Islands Dependencies Survey.
1955	Murdo Finlayson TAIT	Antarctic 1949-1953. Meteorological Observer, Argentine Islands 1949-1950, and Hope Bay 1952-1953, Falkland Islands Dependencies Survey.
1955	Michael John UNWIN	Antarctic 1952. Meteorological Observer, Hope Bay, Falkland Islands Dependencies Survey.
1955	Robert George DOVERS	Antarctic 1952. Surveyor and Australian Observer, French Antarctic Expeditions to Adelie Land.
1955	Fritz LOEWE	Antarctic 1951. Glaciologist and Official Australian Observer, French Antarctic Expeditions to Adelie Land.
1954	Richard Alexander HAMILTON	Clasp. Arctic 1952-1953. Chief Scientist and Second-in-Command, British North Greenland Expedition, July 1952 to August 1954
1954	John Stanley AGAR	Arctic 1952-1953. Radio Officer, British North Greenland Expedition, July 1952 to August 1954
1954	Keith Charles ARNOLD	Arctic 1952-1953. Surveyor, British North Greenland Expedition, July 1952 to August 1954.
1954	Michael Edward Borg BANKS	Arctic 1952-1953. Officer-in-Charge of a vehicle team, British North Greenland Expedition, July 1952 to August 1954.
1954	Sidney Peter BOARDMAN	Arctic 1952-1954. Vehicle Mechanic, British North Greenland Expedition, July 1952 to August 1954.
1954	Richard BRETT-KNOWLES	Arctic 1952-1953. Assistant Scientist and Radio Officer, Second Year, British North Greenland Expedition, July 1952 to August 1954.
1954	Francis Richard BROOKE	Arctic 1952-1954. Surveyor, British North Greenland Expedition, July 1952 to August 1954
1954	Robert John Maurice BRUCE	Arctic 1953-1954. Seismic Operator, British North Greenland Expedition, July 1952 to August 1954
1954	Colin Bruce Bradley BULL	Arctic 1952-1954. Geophysicist and Senior Scientist, Second Year, British North Greenland Expedition, July 1952 to August 1954
1954	George Frederick CADD,	Arctic 1952-1953. Seismic Operator, British North Greenland Expedition, July 1952 to August 1954
1954	Herbert Randle DEAN	Arctic 1952-1954. Senior Radio Operator, British North Greenland Expedition, July 1952 to August 1954
1954	Bruce ERSKINE	Arctic 1952-1954. Officer-in-Charge of sledge dogs, British North Greenland Expedition, July 1952 to August 1954
1954	George Raymond FLETCHER	Arctic 1953-1954. Member of a vehicle team, British North Greenland Expedition, July 1952 to August 1954
1954	Edgar Lemnal HOMARD	Arctic 1953-1954. Vehicle Mechanic, British North Greenland Expedition, July 1952 to August 1954
1954	Edward Owen JONES	Arctic 1952-1954. Officer-in-Charge central ice-cap station, and vehicle team, British North Greenland Expedition, July 1952 to August 1954
1954	Harold Ellis LEWIS	Arctic 1952-1953. Physiologist, British North Greenland Expedition, July 1952 to August 1954
1954	Harold LISTER	Arctic 1952-1954. Senior Glaciologist, British North Greenland Expedition, July 1952 to August 1954
1954	John Potter MASTERTON	Arctic 1952-1954. Medical Officer, British North Greenland Expedition, July 1952 to August 1954
1954	Ronald William MORETON	Arctic 1952-1954. Stores and Equipment Officer, British North Greenland Expedition, July 1952 to August 1954
1954	John William OAKLEY	Arctic 1952-1954. Vehicle Mechanic, British North Greenland Expedition, July 1952 to August 1954
1954	Stanley PATERSON	Arctic 1953-1954. Physicist, British North Greenland Expedition, July 1952 to August 1954
1954	James Douglas PEACOCK	Arctic 1952-1953. Senior Geologist, British North Greenland Expedition, July 1952 to August 1954
1954	Graham ROLLITT	Arctic 1952-1954. Meteorologist and Second-in-Command, Second Year, British North Greenland Expedition, July 1952 to August 1954
1954	Cortlandt James Woore SIMPSON	Arctic 1952-1954. Leader, British North Greenland Expedition, July 1952 to August 1954
1954	Charles George Malcolm SLESSER,	Arctic 1952-1953. Assistant(Physicist and Surveyor, British North Greenland Expedition, July 1952 to August 1954
1954	Earl TAYLOR	Arctic 1952-1954. Radio Operator, British North Greenland Expedition, July 1952 to August 1954
1954	Peter Francis TAYLOR	Arctic 1952-1954. Assistant Glaciologist, British North Greenland Expedition, July 1952 to August 1954
1954	James Douglas WALKER	Arctic 1952-1953. Officer-in-Charge of vehicles, British North Greenland Expedition, July 1952 to August 1954
1954	Peter John WYLLIE	Arctic 1952-1954. Geologist, British North Greenland Expedition, July 1952 to August 1954
1954	James Slessor MARR	Antarctic 1944. Base Leader, Port Lockroy, Falkland Islands Dependencies Survey (Operation Tabarin)
1953	Oliver BURD	Posthumous. Silver. Antarctic 1947-1948. Meteorologist, Argentine Islands and Hope Bay, Falkland Islands Dependencies Survey.
1953	Michael Campbell GREEN	Posthumous. Silver. Antarctic 1948. Silver. Geologist, Hope Bay, Falkland Islands Dependencies Survey.
1953	Edward William BINGHAM	Clasp. Silver. Antarctic 1946. Base Leader, Marguerite Bay, Falkland Islands Dependencies Survey.
1953	Raymond John ADIE	Antarctic 1947-1949. Silver. Geologist, Hope and Marguerite Bays, Falkland Islands Dependencies Survey.
1953	James Darby ANDREW	Antarctic 1946. Silver. Medical Officer, Hope Bay, Falkland Islands Dependencies Survey.
1953	Lewis ASHTON	Antarctic 1944-1945. Silver. Carpenter, Port Lockroy and Hope Bay, Falkland Islands Dependencies Survey.
1953	Eric Hatfield BACK	Antarctic 1944-1945. Silver. Medical Officer and Meteorologist, Port Lockroy and Hope Bay, Falkland Islands Dependencies Survey.
1953	Alfred Thomas BERRY	Antarctic 1944-1945. Silver. Purser, Port Lockroy and Hope Bay, Falkland Islands Dependencies Survey.
1953	Kenneth Victor BLAIKLOCK	Antarctic 1948-1949. Silver. Surveyor, Marguerite Bay, Falkland Islands Dependencies Survey.
1953	John BLYTH	Antarctic 1945. Silver. Cook, Hope Bay, Falkland Islands Dependencies Survey.
1953	Colin Chalmers BROWN	Antarctic 1948-1949. Silver. Surveyor, Marguerite Bay, Falkland Islands Dependencies Survey.
1953	Arthur Richard Cecil BUTSON, A.M., M.A., M.D.	Antarctic 1947. Silver. Medical Officer, Marguerite Bay, Falkland Islands Dependencies Survey.
1953	Michael Anthony CHOYCE	Antarctic 1946-1947. Silver. Meteorologist, Cape Geddes and Hope Bay, Falkland Islands Dependencies Survey.
1953	William Noble CROFT	Posthumous. Antarctic 1946. Silver. Geologist, Hope Bay, Falkland Islands Dependencies Survey.
1953	David Geoffrey DALGLEISH	Antarctic 1948-1949. Silver. Medical Officer, Marguerite Bay, Falkland Islands Dependencies Survey.
1953	Gwion DAVIES	Antarctic 1944-1945. Silver. Scientific Assistant, Port Lockroy and Hope Bay, Falkland Islands Dependencies Survey.
1953	Thomas DONNOCHIE	Antarctic 1945. Silver. Wireless Operator, Hope Bay, Falkland Islands Dependencies Survey.
1953	Frank Kenneth ELLIOTT	Antarctic 1947-1948. Silver. Base Leader, Hope Bay, Falkland Islands Dependencies Survey.
1953	William Robert FLETT	Antarctic 1944-1945. Silver. Geologist, Deception Island and Hope Bay, Falkland Islands Dependencies Survey.
1953	Samuel John FRANCIS	Antarctic 1946-1947. Silver. Surveyor, Hope Bay, Falkland Islands Dependencies Survey.
1953	Reginald Leonard FREEMAN	Antarctic 1946-1947. Silver. Surveyor, Hope Bay, Falkland Islands Dependencies Survey.
1953	Vivian Ernest FUCHS	Antarctic 1948-1949. Silver. Base Leader and Geologist, Marguerite Bay, Falkland Islands Dependencies Survey.
1953	John Sydney Rodney HUCKLE	Antarctic 1947-1949. Silver. Assistant, Deception Island and Marguerite Bay, Falkland Islands Dependencies Survey.
1953	David Pelham JAMES	Antarctic 1945. Silver. Surveyor, Hope Bay, Falkland Islands Dependencies Survey.
1953	Brian JEFFORD	Antarctic 1948-1949. Silver. Surveyor, Hope and Admiralty Bays, Falkland Islands Dependencies Survey.
1953	Harold David JONES	Antarctic 1947-1949. Silver. Aircraft Mechanic, Marguerite Bay, Falkland Islands Dependencies Survey.
1953	John Raymond Foggan JOYCE	Antarctic 1946. Silver. Geologist, Marguerite Bay, Falkland Islands Dependencies Survey.
1953	Ivan Mackenzie LAMB	Antarctic 1944-1945. Silver. Botanist, Port Lockroy and Hope Bay, Falkland Islands Dependencies Survey.
1953	Kenneth Alexander McLEOD	Antarctic 1947. Silver. Meteorologist, Marguerite Bay, Falkland Islands Dependencies Survey.
1953	Stephen St. Clair McNEILE	Antarctic 1948. Silver. Surveyor, Hope Bay, Falkland Islands Dependencies Survey.
1953	Norman Bertram MARSHALL	Antarctic 1945. Silver. Zoologist, Hope Bay, Falkland Islands Dependencies Survey.
1953	Douglas Percy MASON	Antarctic 1946-1947. Silver. Surveyor, Marguerite Bay, Falkland Islands Dependencies Survey.
1953	John MATHESON	Antarctic 1944-1945. Silver. Boatswain, Port Lockroy and Hope Bay, Falkland Islands Dependencies Survey.
1953	Derwent Newman NICHOLSON	Antarctic 1947. Silver. Handyman, Hope Bay, Falkland Islands Dependencies Survey.
1953	John Laurence O'HARE	Antarctic 1948. Silver. Wireless Telegraphist, Hope Bay, Falkland Islands Dependencies Survey.
1953	Patrick O'SULLIVAN	Antarctic 1946. Silver. Assistant, Hope Bay, Falkland Islands Dependencies Survey.
1953	Kenelm Somerset PIERCE-BUTLER	Antarctic 1946-1947. Silver. Base Leader and Meteorologist, Marguerite Bay, Falkland Islands Dependencies Survey.
1953	Terence RANDALL	Antarctic 1947-1949. Silver. Wireless Telegraphist, Marguerite Bay, Falkland Islands Dependencies Survey.
1953	Alan William REECE	Antarctic 1946. Silver. Meteorologist, Hope Bay, Falkland Islands Dependencies Survey.
1953	John Michael ROBERTS	Antarctic 1947. Silver. Medical Officer, Hope Bay, Falkland Islands Dependencies Survey.
1953	Victor RUSSELL	Antarctic 1945-1946. Silver. Base Leader and Surveyor, Hope Bay, Falkland Islands Dependencies Survey.
1953	W. Michael SADLER	Antarctic 1946. Silver. Assistant, Marguerite Bay, Falkland Islands Dependencies Survey.
1953	Willoughby de Carle SALTER	Antarctic 1946. Silver. Meteorologist, Marguerite Bay, Falkland Islands Dependencies Survey.
1953	William Joseph Lambert SLADEN	Antarctic 1948. Silver. Medical Officer and Biologist, Hope Bay, Falkland Islands Dependencies Survey.
1953	Robert Stewart SLESSOR	Antarctic 1946. Silver. Medical Officer, Marguerite Bay, Falkland Islands Dependencies Survey.
1953	Stuart Hopton SMALL	Antarctic 1946-1947. Silver. Wireless Telegraphist, Hope Bay, Falkland Islands Dependencies Survey.
1953	James Terence SMITH	Antarctic 1947. Silver. Handyman, Hope Bay, Falkland Islands Dependencies Survey.
1953	Robert Edward SPIVEY	Antarctic 1948-1949. Silver. Assistant, Marguerite Bay, Falkland Islands Dependencies Survey.
1953	Bernard STONEHOUSE	Antarctic 1947-1949. Silver. Biologist, Marguerite Bay, Falkland Islands Dependencies Survey.
1953	Andrew TAYLOR	Antarctic 1944-1945. Silver. Base Leader and Surveyor, Port Lockroy and Hope Bay, Falkland Islands Dependencies Survey.
1953	William Harvie THOMSON	Antarctic 1947. Silver. Pilot, Marguerite Bay, Falkland Islands Dependencies Survey.
1953	John Eliot TONKIN	Antarctic 1946-1947. Silver. Navigator, Marguerite Bay, Falkland Islands Dependencies Survey.
1953	Patrick Arnold TOYNBEE	Antarctic 1948-1949. Silver. Pilot, Marguerite Bay, Falkland Islands Dependencies Survey.
1953	William Richard WALLIN	Antarctic 1946-1947. Silver. Handyman, Hope Bay, Falkland Islands Dependencies Survey.
1953	Eric William Kevin WALTON	Antarctic 1946-1947. Silver. Engineer, Marguerite Bay, Falkland Islands Dependencies Survey.

=== 1940s ===
Year	Recipient	Details
1946	Henry Asbjorn LARSEN	Clasp. Silver. Arctic. R.C.M.P. Steamship St. Roch, which made a cruise of over a year in Arctic waters exploring the North-West Passage.
1946	George William PETERS	Clasp. Silver. Arctic. R.C.M.P. Steamship St. Roch, which made a cruise of over a year in Arctic waters exploring the North-West Passage.
1946	Patrick George HUNT	Clasp. Silver. Arctic. R.C.M.P. Steamship St. Roch, which made a cruise of over a year in Arctic waters exploring the North-West Passage.
1946	Kames Milne DIPLOCK	Silver. Arctic. R.C.M.P. Steamship St. Roch, which made a cruise of over a year in Arctic waters exploring the North-West Passage.
1946	Rudolf Thorvald JOHNSEN	Silver. Arctic. R.C.M.P. Steamship St. Roch, which made a cruise of over a year in Arctic waters exploring the North-West Passage.
1946	Ole ANDREASEN	Silver. Arctic. R.C.M.P. Steamship St. Roch, which made a cruise of over a year in Arctic waters exploring the North-West Passage.
1946	William Michael CASHIN	Silver. Arctic. R.C.M.P. Steamship St. Roch, which made a cruise of over a year in Arctic waters exploring the North-West Passage.
1946	Kohn Stanley McKENZiE	Silver. Arctic. R.C.M.P. Steamship St. Roch, which made a cruise of over a year in Arctic waters exploring the North-West Passage.
1946	Frank MATTHEWS	Silver. Arctic. R.C.M.P. Steamship St. Roch, which made a cruise of over a year in Arctic waters exploring the North-West Passage.
1946	George Bryden DICKENS	Silver. Arctic. R.C.M.P. Steamship St. Roch, which made a cruise of over a year in Arctic waters exploring the North-West Passage.
1946	Lloyd George RUSSILL	Silver. Arctic. R.C.M.P. Steamship St. Roch, which made a cruise of over a year in Arctic waters exploring the North-West Passage.
1942	H. A. Larsen,	Silver. Arctic 1940-1942. Master and Navigator, R.C.M.P. schooner St. Roch.
1942	M. F. Foster	Silver. Arctic 1940-1942. First Engineer, R.C.M.P. schooner St. Roch.
1942	F. S. Farrar	Silver. Arctic 1940-1942. Mate, R.C.M.P. schooner St. Roch.
1942	E. C. Hadley	Silver. Arctic 1940-1942. Wireless Operator, R.C.M.P. schooner St. Roch.
1942	G. W. Peters	Silver. Arctic 1940-1942. Second Engineer, R.C.M.P. schooner St. Roch.
1942	A. J. Chartrand	Posthumous. Silver. Arctic 1940-1942. Deck Hand, R.C.M.P. schooner St. Roch.
1942	P. G. Hunt	Silver. Arctic 1940-1942. Deck Hand, R.C.M.P. schooner St. Roch.
1942	W. J. Parry	Silver. Arctic 1940-1942. Cook, R.C.M.P. schooner St. Roch.
1942	Alexander Richard Glen	Silver. Arctic 1935-36. Oxford University Arctic Expedition to NorthEast Land in 1935 and 1936.
1942	Robert Moss	Silver. Arctic 1935-36. Oxford University Arctic Expedition to NorthEast Land in 1935 and 1936.
1942	Noel Andrew	Silver. Arctic 1935-36. Oxford University Arctic Expedition to NorthEast Land in 1935 and 1936.
1942	Arthur Stuart Talbot Godfrey	Silver. Arctic 1935-36. Oxford University Arctic Expedition to NorthEast Land in 1935 and 1936.
1942	Amherst Barrow Whatman	Silver. Arctic 1935-36. Oxford University Arctic Expedition to NorthEast Land in 1935 and 1936.
1942	Richard A. Hamilton	Silver. Arctic 1935-36. Oxford University Arctic Expedition to NorthEast Land in 1935 and 1936.
1942	David B. Keith	Silver. Arctic 1935-36. Oxford University Arctic Expedition to NorthEast Land in 1935 and 1936.
1942	Archibald Dunlop-Mackenzie	Silver. Arctic 1935-36. Oxford University Arctic Expedition to NorthEast Land in 1935 and 1936.
1942	John W. Wright	Silver. Arctic 1935-36. Oxford University Arctic Expedition to NorthEast Land in 1935 and 1936.
1941	All the following, from 1941, are "for good services between the years 1925-1939, in the Royal Research Ships "Discovery II" and "William Scoresby""	
1941	William Ault Horton	Posthumous. Clasp. Bronze. Royal Research Ships Discovery II and William Scoresby.
1941	James William Slessor Marr	Bronze. Clasp. H.M. Ships Discovery II and William Scoresby.
1941	George Ayres	Bronze. Clasp. Able Seaman (then Netman), H.M.S Discovery II.
1941	John Matheson	Bronze. Clasp. Boatswain (then Boatswain's Mate), H.M.S. Discovery II.
1941	William Melvin Carey	Posthumous. Bronze. H.M.S. Discovery II.
1941	Eustace Rolf Gunther	Posthumous. Bronze. Royal Research Ships Discovery II and William Scoresby.
1941	Dennis Noble Daley	Posthumous. Bronze. Fireman, H.M.S. Discovery II.
1941	John Colman Cook	Bronze. Leading Fireman, H.M. Ships Discovery and Discovery II.
1941	John Miller Chaplin	Bronze.
1941	Richard Laurence Vere Shannon	Bronze. H.M.S. William Scoresby.
1941	Ronald Clifford Freaker	Bronze. H.M.S. William Scoresby.
1941	Kirk wood	Bronze. H.M.S. Discovery II.
1941	Richard Arthur Blyth Ardley	Bronze. H.M.S. Discovery II.
1941	Leonard-Charles Hill	Bronze. H.M. Ships Discovery II and William Scoresby.
1941	Frederick Macfie	Bronze. H.M. Ships Discovery II and William Scoresby.
1941	Alfred Laidlaw Nelson	Bronze. H.M.S. Discovery II.
1941	Richard Walker	Bronze. H.M.S. Discovery II.
1941	Claude Reginald Underwood Boothby	Bronze. H.M.S. William Scoresby
1941	Thomas Herbert Beveridge Oates	Bronze. H.M. Ships Discovery II and William Scoresby.
1941	David Roy	Bronze. H.M.S. William Scoresby
1941	Edward Hillis Marshall	Bronze. H.M. Ships Discovery and Discovery II.
1941	Archibald John Clowes	Bronze. H.M.S. Discovery II.
1941	George Edward Raven Deacon	Bronze. H.M. Ships Discovery II and William Scoresby.
1941	Francis Charles Fraser	Bronze. H.M. Ships Discovery and Discovery II.
1941	Walter Frederick Fry	Bronze. H.M.S. Discovery II
1941	John Erik Hamilton	Bronze. H.M.S. Discovery.
1941	Thomas John Hart	Bronze. H.M. Ships Discovery II and William Scoresby.
1941	Henry Franceys Porter Herdman	Bronze. H.M. Ships Discovery and Discovery II.
1941	David Dilwyn John	Bronze. H.M. Ships Discovery II and William Scoresby.
1941	Stanley Wells Kemp	Bronze. H.M. Ships Discovery II and William Scoresby.
1941	Alec Hibburd Laurie	Bronze. H.M. Ships Discovery II and William Scoresby.
1941	Neil Alison Macintosh	Bronze. H.M. Ships Discovery II and William Scoresby.
1941	Francis Downes Ommanney	Bronze. H.M.S. Discovery II
1941	George William Rayner	Bronze. H.M. Ships Discovery II and William Scoresby.
1941	Alfred Saunders	Bronze. H.M.S. Discovery II
1941	Bernard Dales	Bronze. H.M.S. William Scoresby.
1941	Robert George Gourlay	Bronze. H.M. Ships Discovery and Discovery II.
1941	Gilbert Stuart Hunter	Bronze. H.M.S. William Scoresby.
1941	Andrew Nicol Porteous	Bronze. H.M. Ships Discovery and Discovery II.
1941	Frank Douglas Swan	Bronze. H.M. Ships Discovery II and William Scoresby.
1941	John Fleming Warnock	Bronze. H.M.S. William Scoresby.
1941	Sydney Austin Bainbridge,	Bronze. Junior Assistant Purser (then Writer), H.M.S. Discovery II.
1941	Alfred Thomas Berry	Bronze. Chief Steward, H.M.S. Discovery II.
1941	Heinrich Bockel	Bronze. Fireman, H.M.S. Discovery II.
1941	Albert Thomas Braillard	Bronze. Able Seaman, H.M.S. Discovery II.
1941	Alfred Charles Briggs	Bronze. Able Seaman, H.M.Ships Discovery and Discovery II.
1941	Cecil Douglas Buchanan	Bronze. Artificer Engineer, H.M. Ships Discovery II and William Scoresby.
1941	John Cargill	Bronze. Able Seaman (then Boatswain), H.M. Ships Discovery, Discovery II and William Scoresby.
1941	W. O. Clark	Bronze. Stoker, H.M.S. William Scoresby.
1941	Norman Frank Cobbett	Bronze. Able Seaman, H.M.S. Discovery II.
1941	John Richard Connolly	Bronze. 3rd Officer (then Ordinary Seaman), H.M.S. Discovery II.
1941	John Edward Dobson	Bronze. Ordinary Seaman, H.M.S. Discovery II.
1941	James Edward Butler Farrington	Bronze. Telegraphist, H.M.S. William Scoresby.
1941	Charles Gobart	Bronze. Assistant Steward, H.M.S. Discovery II.
1941	James Grant	Bronze. Carpenter, H.M.S. Discovery II.
1941	William Henry Hellyer	Bronze. Assistant Steward, H.M.S. William Scoresby.
1941	Walter J. Hewitt	Bronze. Fireman, H.M.S. Discovery II.
1941	Edwin Charles Hum	Bronze. Sailor, H.M.S. William Scoresby.
1941	James Charles Jameson	Bronze. Able Seaman, H.M. Ships Discovery II and William Scoresby,.
1941	Harold Alfred Johns	Bronze. Able Seaman, H.M.S.Discovery II.
1941	William Reid Johnston	Bronze. Able Seaman, H.M.S. William Scoresby.
1941	Herbert Lloyd Jones	Bronze. Fireman, H.M.S. Discovery II.
1941	William Rhodes Clarke Kebbell	Bronze. Chief Cook, H.M. Ships Discovery II and William Scoresby.
1941	Duncan Kennedy	Bronze. Boatswain (then Netman), H.M.S. Discovery II.
1941	Charles Edward Jack Lashmar	Bronze. Able Seaman, H.M.S. Discovery II.
1941	John Livermore	Bronze. Mess.Boy, H.M.S. Discovery II.
1941	Robert Wood Mackay	Bronze. Scientific Assistant, H.M.S. Discovery II.
1941	John Donald Mackenzie	Bronze. Able Seaman, H.M.S. Discovery II.
1941	Leonard George Marshall	Bronze. Stoker, H.M.S. William Scoresby.
1941	Walter Marshall	Bronze. Able Seaman (then Leading Fireman), H.M.S. William Scoresby.
1941	James Russell Matheson	Bronze. Fireman, H.M.S. Discovery II.
1941	William Mathieson	Bronze. Fireman, H.M.S. William Scoresby.
1941	Daniel Milford	Bronze. Sailor, H.M.S. Discovery II.
1941	Leslie John Miller	Bronze. Assistant Steward, H.M.S. Discovery II.
1941	Arthur Moore	Bronze. Boatswain's Mate, H.M.S. Discovery II.
1941	Harold Vale Moreton	Bronze. Able Seaman (then Boatswain's Mate), H.M.S. Discovery II.
1941	Albert Edward Morris	Bronze. Telegraphist, H.M.S. Discovery II.
1941	Allan Arthur Osgood	Bronze. Able Seaman, H.M.S. Discovery II.
1941	Arthur Parry	Bronze. Able Seaman, H.M.S. Discovery II.
1941	George McKay Patience	Bronze. Able Seaman, H.M.S. Discovery II.
1941	William Arthur Peachey	Bronze. Fireman, H.M.S. Discovery II.
1941	James Purvis	Bronze. Able Seaman, H.M. Ships Discovery and Discovery II.
1941	Joseph Reid	Bronze. Able Seaman, H.M. Ships Discovery II and William Scoresby.
1941	Jerry Ryan	Bronze. Greaser, H.M.S. Discovery II.
1941	Edward William Saddler	Bronze. Second Steward, H.M.S. Discovery II.
1941	Horace William Sandford	Bronze. Fireman, H.M. Ships Discovery, Discovery II and William Scoresby.
1941	Frank Albert Smedley	Bronze. Chief Cook, H.M.S. Discovery II.
1941	D. Stegmann	Bronze. Able Seaman, H.M. Ships Discovery II and William Scoresby.
1941	Albert Edward Stevens	Bronze. Assistant Purser (then Writer), H.M.S. Discovery II.
1941	William Suffield	Bronze. Boatswain, H.M.S. Discovery II.
1941	James Sutherland	Bronze. Engine Room Artificer, H.M.S. William Scoresby.
1941	Leslie Taylor	Bronze. Ordinary Seaman, H.M.S. William Scoresby.
1941	Leonard Henry Thomas	Bronze., Greaser (then Fireman), H.M.S. Discovery II.
1941	Victor Vidulich	Bronze. Fireman, H.M.S. Discovery II.
1941	William White	Bronze. Able Seaman, H.M.S. William Scoresby.
1941	John Whittaker	Bronze. Steward, H.M.S. William Scoresby.
1941	Albert Edward Wyatt	Bronze. Assistant Steward (then Steward), H.M. Ships Discovery II and William Scoresby.

=== 1930s ===
Year	Recipient	Details
1939	George Colin Lawder Bertram, Ph.D.	Silver. Antarctic, 1935-1937. British Graham Land Expedition, 1935-1937.
1939	Verner Duncan Carse	Silver. Antarctic, 1935-1937. British Graham Land Expedition, 1935-1937.
1939	Norman Arthur L. Gurney	Silver. Antarctic, 1935-1937. British Graham Land Expedition, 1935-1937.
1939	The Reverend William Launcelot Scott Fleming	Silver. Antarctic, 1935-1937. British Graham Land Expedition, 1935-1937.
1939	James Hamilton Martin	Silver. Antarctic, 1935-1937. British Graham Land Expedition, 1935-1937.
1939	Captain Ian Forbes Meiklejohn, Royal Corps of Signals	Silver. Antarctic, 1935-1937. British Graham Land Expedition, 1935-1937.
1939	Commander (E) Hugh Mainwaring Millett, R.N.	Silver. Antarctic, 1935-1937. British Graham Land Expedition, 1935-1937.
1939	James Inglis Moore	Silver. Antarctic, 1935-1937. British Graham Land Expedition, 1935-1937.
1939	Brian Birley Roberts	Silver. Antarctic, 1935-1937. British Graham Land Expedition, 1935-1937.
1939	Lieutenant-Commander Robert Edward Dudley Ryder, R.N.	Silver. Antarctic, 1935-1937. British Graham Land Expedition, 1935-1937.
1939	Captain Lisle Charles Dudley Ryder, Royal Norfolk Regiment	Silver. Antarctic, 1935-1937. British Graham Land Expedition, 1935-1937.
1939	Surgeon-Commander Edward William Bingham, M.B., B.Ch., R.N.	Clasp. Silver. Antarctic, 1935-1937. British Graham Land Expedition, 1935-1937.
1939	Wilfred Edward Hampton	Clasp. Silver. Antarctic, 1935-1937. British Graham Land Expedition, 1935-1937.
1939	Quintin Theodore Petroc Molesworth Riley	Clasp. Silver. Antarctic, 1935-1937. British Graham Land Expedition, 1935-1937.
1939	John Riddoch Rymill	Clasp. Silver. Antarctic, 1935-1937. British Graham Land Expedition, 1935-1937.
1939	Alfred Stephenson	Clasp. Silver. Antarctic, 1935-1937. British Graham Land Expedition, 1935-1937.
1934	John K. Davis	Clasp. Bronze. Antarctic, 1929-30. British Australian and New Zealand Antarctic Research Expedition, 1929–1931.
1934	Instructor Commander Morton H. Moyes, B.Sc., R.A.N.	Clasp. Bronze. Antarctic, 1929-30. British, Australian and New Zealand Antarctic Research Expedition, 1929-1931.
1934	William R. Colbeck, R.N.R.	Bronze. Antarctic, 1929-31. British, Australian and New Zealand Antarctic Research Expedition, 1929-1931. (Substituted for notification in the Gazette dated 1 May 1934.)
1934	George Ayres	Bronze. Antarctic, 1929-30. British, Australian and New Zealand Antarctic Research Expedition, 1929-1931.
1934	Allan J. Bartlett	Bronze. Antarctic, 1929-30. British, Australian and New Zealand Antarctic Research Expedition, 1929-1931.
1934	Flight Lieutenant Stuart A. C. Campbell, R.A.A.F.	Bronze. Antarctic, 1929-30. British, Australian and New Zealand Antarctic Research Expedition, 1929-1931.
1934	John B. Child	Bronze. Antarctic, 1929-30. British, Australian and New Zealand Antarctic Research Expedition, 1929-1931.
1934	Flying Officer Eric Douglas, R.A.A.F.	Bronze. Antarctic, 1929-30. British, Australian and New Zealand Antarctic Research Expedition, 1929-1931.
1934	Robert A. Falla, M.A.	Bronze. Antarctic, 1929-30. British, Australian and New Zealand Antarctic Research Expedition, 1929-1931.
1934	Harold O. Fletcher	Bronze. Antarctic, 1929-30. British, Australian and New Zealand Antarctic Research Expedition, 1929-1931.
1934	Wilfrid J. Griggs	Bronze. Antarctic, 1929-30. British, Australian and New Zealand Antarctic Research Expedition, 1929-1931.
1934	Alfred Howard, M.Sc.	Bronze. Antarctic, 1929-30. British, Australian and New Zealand Antarctic Research Expedition, 1929-1931.
1934	James F. Hurley	Bronze. Antarctic, 1929-30. British, Australian and New Zealand Antarctic Research Expedition, 1929-1931.
1934	William W. Ingram, M.O., M.D., Ch.B.	Bronze. Antarctic, 1929-30. British, Australian and New Zealand Antarctic Research Expedition, 1929-1931.
1934	Professor Thomas H. Johnston, D.Sc.	Bronze. Antarctic, 1929-30. British, Australian and New Zealand Antarctic Research Expedition, 1929-1931.
1934	W. H. Letten	Bronze. Antarctic, 1929-30. British, Australian and New Zealand Antarctic Research Expedition, 1929-1931.
1934	James H. Martin	Bronze. Antarctic, 1929-30. British, Australian and New Zealand Antarctic Research Expedition, 1929-1931.
1934	John Matheson	Bronze. Antarctic, 1929-30. British, Australian and New Zealand Antarctic Research Expedition, 1929-1931.
1934	Sir Douglas Mawson, O.B.E., D.Sc., F.R.S.	Bronze. Antarctic, 1929-30. British, Australian and New Zealand Antarctic Research Expedition, 1929-1931.
1934	Kenneth N. Mackenzie	Bronze. Antarctic, 1929-30. British, Australian and New Zealand Antarctic Research Expedition, 1929-1931.
1934	John J. Miller	Bronze. Antarctic, 1929-30. British, Australian and New Zealand Antarctic Research Expedition, 1929-1931.
1934	Ritchie G. Simmers, M.Sc.	Bronze. Antarctic, 1929-30. British, Australian and New Zealand Antarctic Research Expedition, 1929-1931.
1934	Bernard F. Welch	Bronze. Antarctic, 1929-30. British, Australian and New Zealand Antarctic Research Expedition, 1929-1931.
1934	Arthur J. Williams, Chief Petty Officer Telegraphist, R.N.	Bronze. Antarctic, 1929-30. British, Australian and New Zealand Antarctic Research Expedition, 1929-1931.
1934	C. Degerfeldt	Bronze. Antarctic, 1929-30. British, Australian and New Zealand Antarctic Research Expedition, 1929-1931.
1934	Frank G. Dungey	Bronze. Antarctic, 1929-30. British, Australian and New Zealand Antarctic Research Expedition, 1929-1931.
1934	Harry V. Gage	Bronze. Antarctic, 1929-30. British, Australian and New Zealand Antarctic Research Expedition, 1929-1931.
1934	Richard W. Hampson	Bronze. Antarctic, 1929-30. British, Australian and New Zealand Antarctic Research Expedition, 1929-1931.
1934	James T. Kyle	Bronze. Antarctic, 1929-30. British, Australian and New Zealand Antarctic Research Expedition, 1929-1931.
1934	James W. S. Marr, M.A., B.Sc.	Bronze. Antarctic, 1929-30. British, Australian and New Zealand Antarctic Research Expedition, 1929-1931.
1934	Kenneth McLennan	Bronze. Antarctic, 1929-30. British, Australian and New Zealand Antarctic Research Expedition, 1929-1931.
1934	F. Leonard Marsland	Bronze. Antarctic, 1929-30. British, Australian and New Zealand Antarctic Research Expedition, 1929-1931.
1934	John A. Park	Bronze. Antarctic, 1929-30. British, Australian and New Zealand Antarctic Research Expedition, 1929-1931.
1934	Clarence H. V. Selwood	Bronze. Antarctic, 1929-30. British, Australian and New Zealand Antarctic Research Expedition, 1929-1931.
1934	W. Simpson	Bronze. Antarctic, 1929-30. British, Australian and New Zealand Antarctic Research Expedition, 1929-1931.
1934	Stanley R. Smith	Bronze. Antarctic, 1929-30. British, Australian and New Zealand Antarctic Research Expedition, 1929-1931.
1934	F. Sones	Bronze. Antarctic, 1929-30. British, Australian and New Zealand Antarctic Research Expedition, 1929-1931.
1934	Raymond C. Tomlinson	Bronze. Antarctic, 1929-30. British, Australian and New Zealand Antarctic Research Expedition, 1929-1931.
1934	Frank Best	Bronze. Antarctic, 1930-31. British, Australian and New Zealand Antarctic Research Expedition, 1929-1931.
1934	Ernest Bond	Bronze. Antarctic, 1930-31. British, Australian and New Zealand Antarctic Research Expedition, 1929-1931.
1934	William E. Crosby	Bronze. Antarctic, 1930-31. British, Australian and New Zealand Antarctic Research Expedition, 1929-1931.
1934	A. Henriksen	Bronze. Antarctic, 1930-31. British, Australian and New Zealand Antarctic Research Expedition, 1929-1931.
1934	William E. Howard	Bronze. Antarctic, 1930-31. British, Australian and New Zealand Antarctic Research Expedition, 1929-1931.
1934	Alexander L. Kennedy	Bronze. Antarctic, 1930-31. British, Australian and New Zealand Antarctic Research Expedition, 1929-1931.
1934	Norman C. Mateer	Bronze. Antarctic, 1930-31. British, Australian and New Zealand Antarctic Research Expedition, 1929-1931.
1934	Murde C. Morrison	Bronze. Antarctic, 1930-31. British, Australian and New Zealand Antarctic Research Expedition, 1929-1931.
1934	Lieutenant Karl E. Oom, R.A.N.	Bronze. Antarctic, 1930-31. British, Australian and New Zealand Antarctic Research Expedition, 1929-1931.
1934	Louis Parviainen	Bronze. Antarctic, 1930-31. British, Australian and New Zealand Antarctic Research Expedition, 1929-1931.
1934	David Peacock	Bronze. Antarctic, 1930-31. British, Australian and New Zealand Antarctic Research Expedition, 1929-1931.
1934	Josiah J. Pill	Bronze. Antarctic, 1930-31. British, Australian and New Zealand Antarctic Research Expedition, 1929-1931.
1934	William F. Porteus.	Bronze. Antarctic, 1930-31. British, Australian and New Zealand Antarctic Research Expedition, 1929-1931.
1934	John E. Reed	Bronze. Antarctic, 1930-31. British, Australian and New Zealand Antarctic Research Expedition, 1929-1931.
1934	George J. Rhodes	Bronze. Antarctic, 1930-31. British, Australian and New Zealand Antarctic Research Expedition, 1929-1931.
1934	Arthur M. Stanton	Bronze. Antarctic, 1930-31. British, Australian and New Zealand Antarctic Research Expedition, 1929-1931.
1934	Fred. G. Ward	Bronze. Antarctic, 1930-31. British, Australian and New Zealand Antarctic Research Expedition, 1929-1931.
1934	Joseph Williams.	Bronze. Antarctic, 1930-31. British, Australian and New Zealand Antarctic Research Expedition, 1929-1931.
1932	Henry George Watkins (deceased)	Silver. Arctic, 1930-31. British Arctic Air Route Expedition, 1930-1931.
1932	Surgeon Lieutenant Edward William Bingham, M.B., R.N.	Silver. Arctic, 1930-31. British Arctic Air Route Expedition, 1930-1931.
1932	Frederick Spencer Chapman	Silver. Arctic, 1930-31. British Arctic Air Route Expedition, 1930-1931.
1932	Augustine Courtauld	Silver. Arctic, 1930-31. British Arctic Air Route Expedition, 1930-1931.
1932	Flight Lieutenant Henry Iliffe Cozens, R.A.F.	Silver. Arctic, 1930-31. British Arctic Air Route Expedition, 1930-1931.
1932	Flight Lieutenant Narbrough Hughes D'Aeth, R.A.F	Silver. Arctic, 1930-31. British Arctic Air Route Expedition, 1930-1931.
1932	William Edward Hampton	Silver. Arctic, 1930-31. British Arctic Air Route Expedition, 1930-1931.
1932	Captain Percy Lemon, Royal Corps of Signals (deceased)	Silver. Arctic, 1930-31. British Arctic Air Route Expedition, 1930-1931.
1932	Lieutenant Martin Lindsay, Royal Scots Fusiliers	Silver. Arctic, 1930-31. British Arctic Air Route Expedition, 1930-1931.
1932	Quintin Riley	Silver. Arctic, 1930-31. British Arctic Air Route Expedition, 1930-1931.
1932	John Robert (sic) Rymill	Silver. Arctic, 1930-31. British Arctic Air Route Expedition, 1930-1931. [Middle name is actually Riddoch]
1932	James Maurice Scott	Silver. Arctic, 1930-31. British Arctic Air Route Expedition, 1930-1931.
1932	Alfred Stephenson	Silver. Arctic, 1930-31. British Arctic Air Route Expedition, 1930-1931.
1932	Lawrence Richard Wager	Silver. Arctic, 1930-31. British Arctic Air Route Expedition, 1930-1931.

=== 1910s ===
Year	Recipient	Details
1917	Thomas Crean, R.N.	Clasp. Silver. Antarctic 1914-1916. 3rd Officer, Endurance, Imperial Trans-Antarctic Expedition 1914-1916.
1917	Dr. Robert Selby Clark	Silver. Antarctic 1914-1916. Biologist, Endurance, Imperial Trans-Antarctic Expedition 1914-1916.
1917	Alfred Cheetham	Clasp. Silver. Antarctic 1914-1916. 3rd Officer, Endurance, Imperial Trans-Antarctic Expedition 1914-1916.
1917	John Lachlan Cope	Silver. Antarctic 1914-1916. Surgeon, Imperial Trans-Antarctic Expedition 1914-1916.
1917	C. Adrian Donnelly	Silver. Antarctic 1914-1916. 2nd Engineer, Aurora, Imperial Trans-Antarctic Expedition 1914-1916.
1917	Lionel Greenstreet	Silver. Antarctic 1914-1916. Chief Officer, Endurance, Imperial Trans-Antarctic Expedition 1914-1916.
1917	Irvine O. Gaze	Silver. Antarctic 1914-1916. In Charge of Stores, Aurora, Imperial Trans-Antarctic Expedition 1914-1916.
1917	Huberht Taylor Hudson	Silver. Antarctic 1914-1916. Navigating Officer, Endurance, Imperial Trans-Antarctic Expedition 1914-1916.
1917	Leonard Duncan Albert Hussey	Silver. Antarctic 1914-1916. Meteorologist, Endurance, Imperial Trans-Antarctic Expedition 1914-1916.
1917	James Francis Hurley	Clasp. Silver. Antarctic 1914-1916. Photo Recorder, Endurance, Imperial Trans-Antarctic Expedition 1914-1916.
1917	Victor George Hayward	Posthumous. Silver. Antarctic 1914-1916. Store Keeper, Aurora, Imperial Trans-Antarctic Expedition 1914-1916.
1917	Lionel A. Hooke	Silver. Antarctic 1914-1916. Wireless Operator, Aurora, Imperial Trans-Antarctic Expedition 1914-1916.
1917	Reginald William James	Silver. Antarctic 1914-1916. Physicist, Endurance, Imperial Trans-Antarctic Expedition 1914-1916.
1917	Andrew Keith Jack	Silver. Antarctic 1914-1916. Biologist, Aurora, Imperial Trans-Antarctic Expedition 1914-1916.
1917	Ernest Edward Mills Joyce	Clasp. Silver. Antarctic 1914-1916. In Charge of Sledge Dogs, Aurora, Imperial Trans-Antarctic Expedition 1914-1916.
1917	Alexander John henry Kerr	Silver. Antarctic 1914-1916. 2nd Engineer, Endurance, Imperial Trans-Antarctic Expedition 1914-1916.
1917	Thomas Hans Orde-Lees	Silver. Antarctic 1914-1916. Motor Engineer, Endurance, Imperial Trans-Antarctic Expedition 1914-1916.
1917	Alfred H. Larkman	Silver. Antarctic 1914-1916. Chief Engineer, Aurora, Imperial Trans-Antarctic Expedition 1914-1916.
1917	Alexander Hepburne Macklin	Silver. Antarctic 1914-1916. Surgeon, Endurance, Imperial Trans-Antarctic Expedition 1914-1916.
1917	James Archibald McIlroy	Silver. Antarctic 1914-1916. Surgeon, Endurance, Imperial Trans-Antarctic Expedition 1914-1916.
1917	George Edward Marston	Clasp. Silver. Antarctic 1914-1916. Artist, Endurance, Imperial Trans-Antarctic Expedition 1914-1916.
1917	Aeneas Lionel Acton Mackintosh	Posthumous. Silver. Antarctic 1914-1916. Commander, Land Party, Aurora, Imperial Trans-Antarctic Expedition 1914-1916.
1917	Clarence Charles Mauger	Silver. Antarctic 1914-1916. Carpenter, Aurora, Imperial Trans-Antarctic Expedition 1914-1916.
1917	Aubrey Howard Ninnis	Silver. Antarctic 1914-1916. In Charge of Motors, Aurora, Imperial Trans-Antarctic Expedition 1914-1916.
1917	James Paton	Clasp. Silver. Antarctic 1914-1916. Boatswain, Aurora, Imperial Trans-Antarctic Expedition 1914-1916.
1917	Lewis Raphael Rickinson	Silver. Antarctic 1914-1916. Chief Engineer, Endurance, Imperial Trans-Antarctic Expedition 1914-1916.
1917	Richard Walter Richards	Silver. Antarctic 1914-1916. Physicist, Endurance, Imperial Trans-Antarctic Expedition 1914-1916.
1917	Sir Ernest Henry Shackleton	Clasp. Silver. Antarctic 1914-1916. Leader, Endurance, Imperial Trans-Antarctic Expedition 1914-1916.
1917	Joseph Russell Stenhouse	Silver. Antarctic 1914-1916. Master, Aurora, Imperial Trans-Antarctic Expedition 1914-1916.
1917	Alexander Stevens	Silver. Antarctic 1914-1916. Biologist, Aurora, Imperial Trans-Antarctic Expedition 1914-1916.
1917	Rev. Arnold Patrick Spencer-Smith	Posthumous. Silver. Antarctic 1914-1916. Photographer, Aurora, Imperial Trans-Antarctic Expedition 1914-1916.
1917	Leslie J. F. Thomson	Silver. Antarctic 1914-1916. 1st Mate, Aurora, Imperial Trans-Antarctic Expedition 1914-1916.
1917	John Robert Francis Wild	Clasp. Silver. Antarctic 1914-1916. Second-in-Command, Endurance, Imperial Trans-Antarctic Expedition 1914-1916.
1917	Frank Arthur Worsley	Silver. Antarctic 1914-1916. Master, Endurance, Imperial Trans-Antarctic Expedition 1914-1916.
1917	James Mann Wordie	Silver. Antarctic 1914-1916. Chief Scientist, Endurance, Imperial Trans-Antarctic Expedition 1914-1916.
1917	Henry Ernest Wild	Silver. Antarctic 1914-1916. In Charge of Stores, Aurora, Imperial Trans-Antarctic Expedition 1914-1916.
1917	Sydney Atkin	Silver. Antarctic 1914-1916. Able Seaman, Aurora, Imperial Trans-Antarctic Expedition 1914-1916.
1917	William Lincoln Bakewell	Bronze. Antarctic 1914-1916. Able Seaman, Endurance, Imperial Trans-Antarctic Expedition 1914-1916.
1917	Perce Blackborow	Bronze. Antarctic 1914-1916. Able Seaman, Aurora, Imperial Trans-Antarctic Expedition 1914-1916.
1917	Arthur Downing	Bronze. Antarctic 1914-1916. Able Seaman, Aurora, Imperial Trans-Antarctic Expedition 1914-1916.
1917	Charles Glidden	Bronze. Antarctic 1914-1916. Ordinary Seaman, Aurora, Imperial Trans-Antarctic Expedition 1914-1916.
1917	S. Grady	Bronze. Antarctic 1914-1916. Fireman, Aurora, Imperial Trans-Antarctic Expedition 1914-1916.
1917	Charles Green	Bronze. Antarctic 1914-1916. Cook & Baker, Endurance, Imperial Trans-Antarctic Expedition 1914-1916.
1917	Walter Ernest How	Bronze. Antarctic 1914-1916. Able Seaman, Endurance, Imperial Trans-Antarctic Expedition 1914-1916.
1917	William Kavanagh	Bronze. Antarctic 1914-1916. Able Seaman, Aurora, Imperial Trans-Antarctic Expedition 1914-1916.
1917	Timothy McCarthy	Bronze. Antarctic 1914-1916. Able Seaman, Endurance, Imperial Trans-Antarctic Expedition 1914-1916.
1917	Thomas Frank McLeod	Bronze. Antarctic 1914-1916. Able Seaman, Endurance, Imperial Trans-Antarctic Expedition 1914-1916.
1917	William Mugridge	Bronze. Antarctic 1914-1916. Fireman, Aurora, Imperial Trans-Antarctic Expedition 1914-1916.
1917	Edwin Thomas Wise	Bronze. Antarctic 1914-1916. Cook, Aurora, Imperial Trans-Antarctic Expedition 1914-1916.
1917	A. Warren	Bronze. Antarctic 1914-1916. Able Seaman, Aurora, Imperial Trans-Antarctic Expedition 1914-1916.
1917	W Aylward	Bronze. Antarctic 1914-1916. 3rd Mate, Aurora, Imperial Trans-Antarctic Expedition 1914-1916.
1917	W Brock	Bronze. Antarctic 1914-1916. Able Seaman, Aurora, Imperial Trans-Antarctic Expedition 1914-1916.
1917	W Da Kim	Bronze. Antarctic 1914-1916. 2nd Engineer, Aurora, Imperial Trans-Antarctic Expedition 1914-1916.
1917	John King Davis	Clasp. Bronze. Antarctic 1914-1916. Master, Aurora, Imperial Trans-Antarctic Expedition 1914-1916.
1917	Clarence Peterson de la Motte	Clasp. Bronze. Antarctic 1914-1916. 1st Mate, Aurora, Imperial Trans-Antarctic Expedition 1914-1916.
1917	Frederic Jacob Gillies	Clasp. Bronze. Antarctic 1914-1916. Chief Engineer, Aurora, Imperial Trans-Antarctic Expedition 1914-1916.
1917	Walter Henry Hannam	Clasp. Bronze. Antarctic 1914-1916. Donkeyman, Aurora, Imperial Trans-Antarctic Expedition 1914-1916.
1917	William Kavanagh	Clasp. Bronze. Antarctic 1914-1916. Able Seaman, Aurora, Imperial Trans-Antarctic Expedition 1914-1916.
1917	A. de Gras	Bronze. Antarctic 1914-1916. 2nd Mate, Aurora, Imperial Trans-Antarctic Expedition 1914-1916.
1917	W. MacKinnon	Bronze. Antarctic 1914-1916. Able Seaman, Aurora, Imperial Trans-Antarctic Expedition 1914-1916.
1917	M. McNeil	Bronze. Antarctic 1914-1916. Able Seaman, Aurora, Imperial Trans-Antarctic Expedition 1914-1916.
1917	Ewan McDonald	Bronze. Antarctic 1914-1916. Able Seaman, Aurora, Imperial Trans-Antarctic Expedition 1914-1916.
1917	F. G. Middleton	Bronze. Antarctic 1914-1916. Surgeon, Aurora, Imperial Trans-Antarctic Expedition 1914-1916.
1917	Morton Henry Moyes	Clasp. Bronze. Antarctic 1914-1916. 4th Mate, Aurora, Imperial Trans-Antarctic Expedition 1914-1916.
1917	E. Murphy	Bronze. Antarctic 1914-1916. Fireman, Aurora, Imperial Trans-Antarctic Expedition 1914-1916.
1917	Aubrey Howard Ninnis	Clasp. Bronze. Antarctic 1914-1916. Purser, Aurora, Imperial Trans-Antarctic Expedition 1914-1916.
1917	James Paton	Clasp. Bronze. Antarctic 1914-1916. Boatswain, Aurora, Imperial Trans-Antarctic Expedition 1914-1916.
1917	W. Peacock	Bronze. Antarctic 1914-1916. Able Seaman, Aurora, Imperial Trans-Antarctic Expedition 1914-1916.
1917	J. Rafferty	Bronze. Antarctic 1914-1916. Fireman, Aurora, Imperial Trans-Antarctic Expedition 1914-1916.
1917	M. P. Robertson	Bronze. Antarctic 1914-1916. 2nd Steward, Aurora, Imperial Trans-Antarctic Expedition 1914-1916.
1917	T. W. Ryan	Bronze. Antarctic 1914-1916. Wireless Operator, Aurora, Imperial Trans-Antarctic Expedition 1914-1916.
1917	T. Smith	Bronze. Antarctic 1914-1916. Fireman, Aurora, Imperial Trans-Antarctic Expedition 1914-1916.
1917	H. d. Vorgeli	Bronze. Antarctic 1914-1916. Chief Cook, Aurora, Imperial Trans-Antarctic Expedition 1914-1916.
1917	A. Webster	Bronze. Antarctic 1914-1916. Chef Steward, Aurora, Imperial Trans-Antarctic Expedition 1914-1916.
1915	George Frederick Ainsworth	Silver. Antarctic, 1912-14. Meteorologist, Australasian Antarctic Expedition 1911-1914.
1915	Lt. Edward Frederick Robert Bage, Royal Australian Engineers	Silver. Antarctic, 1912-14. Astronomer, Australasian Antarctic Expedition 1911-1914.
1915	Francis Howard Bickerton	Silver. Antarctic, 1912-14. In Charge of Air-Tractor Sledge, Australasian Antarctic Expedition 1911-1914.
1915	John Hamilton Blair	Silver. Antarctic, 1912-14. Chief Officer, Australasian Antarctic Expedition 1911-1914.
1915	Leslie Russell Blake	Silver. Antarctic, 1912-14. Geologist, Australasian Antarctic Expedition 1911-1914.
1915	John H. Close	Silver. Antarctic, 1912-14. Assistant Collector, Australasian Antarctic Expedition 1911-1914.
1915	Percival Edward Correll	Silver. Antarctic, 1912-14. Mechanic, Australasian Antarctic Expedition 1911-1914.
1915	John King Davis	Clasp. Silver. Antarctic, 1912-14. Master, Second-in-Command, Australasian Antarctic Expedition 1911-1914.
1915	Clarence Peterson de la Motte	Silver. Antarctic, 1912-14. Third Officer, Australasian Antarctic Expedition 1911-1914.
1915	Charles Dovers	Silver. Antarctic, 1912-14. Cartographer, Australasian Antarctic Expedition 1911-1914.
1915	Frederic Jacob Gillies	Silver. Antarctic, 1912-14. Chief Engineer, Australasian Antarctic Expedition 1911-1914.
1915	Percival Gray	Silver. Antarctic, 1912-14. Second Officer, Australasian Antarctic Expedition 1911-1914.
1915	Harold Hamilton	Silver. Antarctic, 1912-14. Biologist, Australasian Antarctic Expedition 1911-1914.
1915	Walter Henry Hannam	Silver. Antarctic, 1912-14. Wireless Operator, Australasian Antarctic Expedition 1911-1914.
1915	Charles Turnbull Harrisson	Silver. Antarctic, 1912-14. Biologist, Australasian Antarctic Expedition 1911-1914.
1915	Charles Archibald Hoadley	Silver. Antarctic, 1912-14. Geologist, Australasian Antarctic Expedition 1911-1914.
1915	Alfred James Hodgeman	Silver. Antarctic, 1912-14. Cartographer, Australasian Antarctic Expedition 1911-1914.
1915	John George Hunter	Silver. Antarctic, 1912-14. Chief Biologist, Australasian Antarctic Expedition 1911-1914.
1915	James Francis Hurley	Silver. Antarctic, 1912-14. Official Photographer, Australasian Antarctic Expedition 1911-1914.
1915	Sidney Harry Jeffryes	Silver. Antarctic, 1912-14. Wireless Operator, Australasian Antarctic Expedition 1911-1914.
1915	Dr Sydney Evan Jones	Silver. Antarctic, 1912-14. Medical Officer, Australasian Antarctic Expedition 1911-1914.
1915	Alexander Lorimer Kennedy	Silver. Antarctic, 1912-14. Magnetician, Australasian Antarctic Expedition 1911-1914.
1915	Charles Francis Laseron	Silver. Antarctic, 1912-14. Taxidermist, Australasian Antarctic Expedition 1911-1914.
1915	Cecil Thomas Madigan	Silver. Antarctic, 1912-14. Meteorologist, Australasian Antarctic Expedition 1911-1914.
1915	Sir Douglas Mawson	Clasp. Silver. Antarctic, 1912-14. In Command of Expedition, Australasian Antarctic Expedition 1911-1914.
1915	Dr Archibald Lang McLean	Silver. Antarctic, 1912-14. Chief Medical Officer, Australasian Antarctic Expedition 1911-1914.
1915	O. McNeice	Silver. Antarctic, 1912-14. Crew, Australasian Antarctic Expedition 1911-1914.
1915	Dr Xavier Guillaume Mertz	Posthumous. Silver. Antarctic, 1912-14. In Charge of Dogs, Australasian Antarctic Expedition 1911-1914.
1915	Morton Henry Moyes	Silver. Antarctic, 1912-14. Meteorologist, Australasian Antarctic Expedition 1911-1914.
1915	Herbert Dyce Murphy	Silver. Antarctic, 1912-14. In Charge of Stores, Australasian Antarctic Expedition 1911-1914.
1915	Lt. Belgrave Edward Sutton Ninnis, Royal Fusiliers	Posthumous. Silver. Antarctic, 1912-14. In Charge of Dogs, Australasian Antarctic Expedition 1911-1914.
1915	Charles A. Sandell	Silver. Antarctic, 1912-14. Wireless Operator, Australasian Antarctic Expedition 1911-1914.
1915	Frank Leslie Stillwell	Silver. Antarctic, 1912-14. Geological Collector, Australasian Antarctic Expedition 1911-1914.
1915	Andrew Dougal Watson	Silver. Antarctic, 1912-14. Geologist, Australasian Antarctic Expedition 1911-1914.
1915	Eric Norman Webb	Silver. Antarctic, 1912-14. Chief Magnetician, Australasian Antarctic Expedition 1911-1914.
1915	Dr. Leslie Hatton Whetter	Silver. Antarctic, 1912-14. Surgeon, Australasian Antarctic Expedition 1911-1914.
1915	John Robert Francis Wild	Silver. Antarctic, 1912-14. Chief of Queen Mary Land Party, Australasian Antarctic Expedition 1911-1914.
1915	Frederick Douglas Fletcher	Silver. Antarctic, 1912-14. Chief Officer, Australasian Antarctic Expedition 1911-1914.
1913	Captain Robert Falcon Scott, C.V.O., D.Sc., R.N. (deceased)	Clasp. Silver. Antarctic, 1910-13. British Antarctic Expedition.
1913	Commander Edward Ratcliffe Garth Russell Evans, C.B., R.N.	Silver. Antarctic, 1910-13. British Antarctic Expedition.
1913	Commander Harry Lewin Lee Pennell, R.N.	Silver. Antarctic, 1910-13. British Antarctic Expedition.
1913	Commander Victor Lindsey Arbuthnot Campbell, R.N.	Silver. Antarctic, 1910-13. British Antarctic Expedition.
1913	Lieutenant Henry Edward de Parny Rennick, R.N.	Clasp. Silver. Antarctic, 1910-13. British Antarctic Expedition.
1913	Lieutenant Henry Robertson Bowers, R.I.M.(deceased).	Clasp. Silver. Antarctic, 1910-13. British Antarctic Expedition.
1913	Commander Wilfrid Montague Bruce, R.N.R.	Clasp. Silver. Antarctic, 1910-13. British Antarctic Expedition.
1913	Captain Lawrence E. G. Oates, 6th Inniskilling Dragoons (deceased)	Silver. Antarctic, 1910-13. British Antarctic Expedition.
1913	Surgeon George Murray Levick, R.N.	Silver. Antarctic, 1910-13. British Antarctic Expedition.
1913	Surgeon Edward Leicester Atkinson, R.N.	Silver. Antarctic, 1910-13. British Antarctic Expedition.
1913	Assistant Paymaster Francis Randall Hugo Drake, R.N.	Silver. Antarctic, 1910-13. British Antarctic Expedition.
1913	Edward Adrian Wilson, M.A., M.B. (deceased)	Clasp. Silver. Antarctic, 1910-13. British Antarctic Expedition.
1913	George C. Simpson, D.Sc.	Silver. Antarctic, 1910-13. British Antarctic Expedition.
1913	T. Griffith Taylor, B.A., B.Sc., B.E	Silver. Antarctic, 1910-13. British Antarctic Expedition.
1913	Edward W. Nelson.	Silver. Antarctic, 1910-13. British Antarctic Expedition.
1913	Dennis G. Lillie, M.A.	Silver. Antarctic, 1910-13. British Antarctic Expedition.
1913	Frank Debenham, B.A., B.Sc.	Silver. Antarctic, 1910-13. British Antarctic Expedition.
1913	Charles S. Wright, B.A	Silver. Antarctic, 1910-13. British Antarctic Expedition.
1913	Raymond E. Priestley	Clasp. Silver. Antarctic, 1910-13. British Antarctic Expedition.
1913	Herbert G. Ponting, F.R.G.S.	Silver. Antarctic, 1910-13. British Antarctic Expedition.
1913	Cecil H. Meares.	Silver. Antarctic, 1910-13. British Antarctic Expedition.
1913	Bernard C. Day	Clasp. Silver. Antarctic, 1910-13. British Antarctic Expedition.
1913	Apsley Cherry-Garrard, B.A.	Silver. Antarctic, 1910-13. British Antarctic Expedition.
1913	Tryggve Gran	Silver. Antarctic, 1910-13. British Antarctic Expedition.
1913	Francis Edward Charles Davies, Acting Carpenter, R.N.	Silver. Antarctic, 1910-13. British Antarctic Expedition.
1913	William Williams, R.N.	Silver. Antarctic, 1910-13. British Antarctic Expedition.
1913	William A. Horton, R.N.	Silver. Antarctic, 1910-13. British Antarctic Expedition.
1913	Alfred B. Cheetham, R.N.R.	Silver. Antarctic, 1910-13. British Antarctic Expedition.
1913	W. W. Archer	Silver. Antarctic, 1910-13. British Antarctic Expedition.
1913	W. Lashley, R.N.	Clasp. Silver. Antarctic, 1910-13. British Antarctic Expedition.
1913	Thomas Clissold	Silver. Antarctic, 1910-13. British Antarctic Expedition.
1913	Edgar Evans, R.N. (deceased)	Clasp. Silver. Antarctic, 1910-13. British Antarctic Expedition.
1913	Robert Forde, R.N.	Silver. Antarctic, 1910-13. British Antarctic Expedition.
1913	Thomas Crean, R.N.	Clasp. Silver. Antarctic, 1910-13. British Antarctic Expedition.
1913	Thomas S. Williamson, R.N.	Clasp. Silver. Antarctic, 1910-13. British Antarctic Expedition.
1913	Patrick Keohane, R.N.	Silver. Antarctic, 1910-13. British Antarctic Expedition.
1913	George P. Abbott, R.N.	Silver. Antarctic, 1910-13. British Antarctic Expedition.
1913	Frank V. Browning, R.N.	Silver. Antarctic, 1910-13. British Antarctic Expedition.
1913	Harry Dickason, R.N.	Silver. Antarctic, 1910-13. British Antarctic Expedition.
1913	Frank J. Hooper	Silver. Antarctic, 1910-13. British Antarctic Expedition.
1913	Frederick Parsons, R.N.	Silver. Antarctic, 1910-13. British Antarctic Expedition.
1913	William L. Heald	Clasp. Silver. Antarctic, 1910-13. British Antarctic Expedition.
1913	Arthur S. Bailey, R.N.	Silver. Antarctic, 1910-13. British Antarctic Expedition.
1913	Albert Balson, R.N.	Silver. Antarctic, 1910-13. British Antarctic Expedition.
1913	Joseph Leese, R.N.	Silver. Antarctic, 1910-13. British Antarctic Expedition.
1913	John Hugh Mather, R.N.V.R.	Silver. Antarctic, 1910-13. British Antarctic Expedition.
1913	Thomas F. McLeod	Silver. Antarctic, 1910-13. British Antarctic Expedition.
1913	Mortimer McCarthy	Silver. Antarctic, 1910-13. British Antarctic Expedition.
1913	Charles Williams	Silver. Antarctic, 1910-13. British Antarctic Expedition.
1913	William McDonald	Silver. Antarctic, 1910-13. British Antarctic Expedition.
1913	James Paton	Silver. Antarctic, 1910-13. British Antarctic Expedition.
1913	Robert Brissenden, R.N. (deceased)	Silver. Antarctic, 1910-13. British Antarctic Expedition.
1913	Edward A. McKenzie, R.N.	Silver. Antarctic, 1910-13. British Antarctic Expedition.
1913	William Burton, R.N.	Silver. Antarctic, 1910-13. British Antarctic Expedition.
1913	Angus McDonald	Silver. Antarctic, 1910-13. British Antarctic Expedition.
1913	Thomas McGillion	Silver. Antarctic, 1910-13. British Antarctic Expedition.
1913	W. H. Neale	Silver. Antarctic, 1910-13. British Antarctic Expedition.
1913	Anton Omelchenko	Silver. Antarctic, 1910-13. British Antarctic Expedition.
1913	Demetri Gerof	Silver. Antarctic, 1910-13. British Antarctic Expedition.
1913	James R. Denniston	Bronze. Antarctic, 1910-13. British Antarctic Expedition.
1913	Robert Oliphant	Bronze. Antarctic, 1910-13. British Antarctic Expedition.
1913	William Knowles	Bronze. Antarctic, 1910-13. British Antarctic Expedition.
1913	James Skelton	Bronze. Antarctic, 1910-13. British Antarctic Expedition.
1913	Bernard J. Stone, R.N.	Bronze. Antarctic, 1910-13. British Antarctic Expedition.
1913	Charles Lammas	Bronze. Antarctic, 1910-13. British Antarctic Expedition.

=== 1900s ===
Year	Recipient	Details
1909	Ernest Henry Shackleton, C.V.O.	Clasp. Silver. Antarctic, 1907-1909. British Antarctic Expedition.
1909	Lieutenant Jameson Boyd Adams, R.N.R.	Silver. Antarctic, 1907-1909. British Antarctic Expedition.
1909	Dr. Eric Stewart Marshall	Silver. Antarctic, 1907-1909. British Antarctic Expedition.
1909	Professor Tannatt William Edgeworth David, F.R.S.	Silver. Antarctic, 1907-1909. British Antarctic Expedition.
1909	James Murray	Silver. Antarctic, 1907-1909. British Antarctic Expedition.
1909	Douglas Mawson	Silver. Antarctic, 1907-1909. British Antarctic Expedition.
1909	Raymond Edward Priestley	Silver. Antarctic, 1907-1909. British Antarctic Expedition.
1909	Dr. Alistair Forbes Mackay	Silver. Antarctic, 1907-1909. British Antarctic Expedition.
1909	Sir Philip Lee Brocklehurst, Baronet	Silver. Antarctic, 1907-1909. British Antarctic Expedition.
1909	Aeneas Lionel Acton Mackintosh	Silver. Antarctic, 1907-1909. British Antarctic Expedition.
1909	George Edward Marston	Silver. Antarctic, 1907-1909. British Antarctic Expedition.
1909	Bernard C. Day	Silver. Antarctic, 1907-1909. British Antarctic Expedition.
1909	Albert Borlase Armitage	Silver. Antarctic, 1907-1909. British Antarctic Expedition.
1909	W. Roberts	Silver. Antarctic, 1907-1909. British Antarctic Expedition.
1909	Ernest Edward Mills Joyce	Clasp. Silver. Antarctic, 1907-1909. British Antarctic Expedition.
1909	John Robert Francis Wild	Clasp. Silver. Antarctic, 1907-1909. British Antarctic Expedition.
1909	Sub-Lieutenant Rupert G. England, R.N.R.	Clasp. Bronze. Antarctic, 1907-1909. British Antarctic Expedition.
1909	F. P. Evans	Bronze. Antarctic, 1907-1909. British Antarctic Expedition.
1909	John King Davis	Bronze. Antarctic, 1907-1909. British Antarctic Expedition.
1909	A. E. Harboard	Bronze. Antarctic, 1907-1909. British Antarctic Expedition.
1909	A. Cheetham	Clasp. Bronze. Antarctic, 1907-1909. British Antarctic Expedition.
1909	G. Bilsby	Clasp. Bronze. Antarctic, 1907-1909. British Antarctic Expedition.
1909	E. Ellis	Bronze. Antarctic, 1907-1909. British Antarctic Expedition.
1909	H. Bull	Bronze. Antarctic, 1907-1909. British Antarctic Expedition.
1909	W. Ansell	Bronze. Antarctic, 1907-1909. British Antarctic Expedition.
1909	S. Riches	Bronze. Antarctic, 1907-1909. British Antarctic Expedition.
1909	J. Paton	Clasp. Bronze. Antarctic, 1907-1909. British Antarctic Expedition.
1909	J. Montague	Bronze. Antarctic, 1907-1909. British Antarctic Expedition.
1909	W. A. R. Michell	Bronze. Antarctic, 1907-1909. British Antarctic Expedition.
1909	H. Dunlop	Bronze. Antarctic, 1907-1909. British Antarctic Expedition.
1904	Lieut. Albert Borlase Armitage, R.N.R.	Silver. Antarctic 1902-1904. Navigator, Second-in-Command, Discovery, British National Antarctic Expedition.
1904	P.O. David Silver Allan R.N.	Silver. Antarctic 1902-1904. Petty Officer 1st Class, Discovery, British National Antarctic Expedition.
1904	Lieut. Michael Barne, R.N.	Silver. Antarctic 1902-1904. 2nd Lieutenant, Discovery, British National Antarctic Expedition.
1904	Louis Charles Bernacchi	Silver. Antarctic 1902-1904. Physicist, British National Antarctic Expedition.
1904	Pte. Arthur Henry Blissett, R.M.	Silver. Antarctic 1902-1904. Wardroom Servant, Discovery, British National Antarctic Expedition.
1904	P.O. Jacob Cross, R.N.	Silver. Antarctic 1902-1904. Petty Officer, Discovery, British National Antarctic Expedition. .
1904	George Beaver Croucher, R.N.	Silver. Antarctic 1902-1904. Able Seaman, Discovery, British National Antarctic Expedition. .
1904	Thomas Crean, R.N.	Silver. Antarctic 1902-1904. Able Seaman, Discovery, British National Antarctic Expedition. .
1904	Charles Clarke	Silver. Antarctic 1902-1904. Ship's Cook, Discovery, British National Antarctic Expedition.
1904	Frederick Ernest Dailey, R.N.	Silver. Antarctic 1902-1904. Carpenter, Discovery, British National Antarctic Expedition.
1904	James Henry Dellbridge, R.N.	Silver. Antarctic 1902-1904. Second Engineer, Discovery, British National Antarctic Expedition.
1904	James William Dell, R.N.	Silver. Antarctic 1902-1904. Able Seaman, Discovery, British National Antarctic Expedition.
1904	James Duncan	Bronze. Antarctic 1902-1904. Carpenter's Mate, Discovery, British National Antarctic Expedition.
1904	P.O. Edgar Evans	Silver. Antarctic 1902-1904. Petty Officer, Discovery, British National Antarctic Expedition. .
1904	Hartley Travers Ferrar	Silver. Antarctic 1902-1904. Geologist, British National Antarctic Expedition.
1904	P.O. Thomas Alfred Feather, R.N.	Silver. Antarctic 1902-1904. Boatswain, Discovery, British National Antarctic Expedition.
1904	Charles Reginald Ford, R.N.	Silver. Antarctic 1902-1904. Chief Steward, Discovery, British National Antarctic Expedition.
1904	Thomas Vere Hodgeson	Silver. Antarctic 1902-1904. Naturalist, British National Antarctic Expedition.
1904	William Lofthouse Heald	Silver. Antarctic 1902-1904. Seaman, Discovery, British National Antarctic Expedition.
1904	Jesse Handsley	Silver. Antarctic 1902-1904. Seaman, Discovery, British National Antarctic Expedition.
1904	Clarence Howard Hare	Bronze. Antarctic 1902-1904. Domestic, Discovery, British National Antarctic Expedition.
1904	P.O. Ernest Edward Mills Joyce, R.N.	Silver. Antarctic 1902-1904. British National Antarctic Expedition.
1904	Reginald Koettlitz	Silver. Antarctic 1902-1904. Surgeon/Doctor, British National Antarctic Expedition.
1904	P.O. Thomas Kennar, R.N.	Silver. Antarctic 1902-1904. Petty Officer 2nd Class, Discovery, British National Antarctic Expedition.
1904	Chief Stoker William Lashly, R.N.	Silver. Antarctic 1902-1904. Leading Stoker, Discovery, British National Antarctic Expedition.
1904	Sub-Lieut. George Francis Arthur Mulock, R.N.	Silver. Antarctic 1902-1904. British National Antarctic Expedition.
1904	William McFarlane, Petty Officer Cl. 1 R.N.	Bronze. Antarctic 1902-1904. Petty Officer, Hydrographer, Discovery, British National Antarctic Expedition. .
1904	Arthur Pilbeam, R.N.	Silver. Antarctic 1902-1904. Leading Seaman, British National Antarctic Expedition.
1904	Frank Plumley, R.N.	Silver. Antarctic 1902-1904. Stoker, Discovery, British National Antarctic Expedition.
1904	Arthur Lester Quartley	Silver. Antarctic 1902-1904. Leading Stoker, Discovery, British National Antarctic Expedition.
1904	Lieut. Charles William Rawson Royds, R.N.	Silver. Antarctic 1902-1904. 1st Lieutenant, Discovery, British National Antarctic Expedition.
1904	Capt. Robert Falcon Scott R.N.	Silver. Antarctic 1902-1904. Leader, British National Antarctic Expedition. .
1904	Sub-Lieut. Ernest Henry Shackleton, R.N.R.	Silver. Antarctic 1902-1904. 3rd Lieutenant, Discovery, British National Antarctic Expedition.
1904	Lieut. Reginald W. Skelton, R.N.	Silver. Antarctic 1902-1904. Chief Engineer, Discovery, British National Antarctic Expedition.
1904	P.O. William Smyth, R.N.	Silver. Antarctic 1902-1904. Petty Officer, Discovery, British National Antarctic Expedition.
1904	Gilbert Scott	Silver. Antarctic 1902-1904. Steward, Discovery, British National Antarctic Expedition.
1904	George T. Vince, R. N.	Posthumous. Bronze. Antarctic 1902-1904. Able Seaman, Discovery, British National Antarctic Expedition. .
1904	Edward A. Wilson	Silver. Antarctic 1902-1904. Assistant Surgeon, Discovery, British National Antarctic Expedition.
1904	John Robert Francis Wild, R.N.	Silver. Antarctic 1902-1904. Able Seaman, British National Antarctic Expedition.
1904	Thomas Soulsby Williamson	Silver. Antarctic 1902-1904. Able Seaman, Discovery, British National Antarctic Expedition.
1904	William Isaac Weller	Silver. Antarctic 1902-1904. Dog Handler, British National Antarctic Expedition.
1904	Thomas Whitfield, R.N.	Silver. Antarctic 1902-1904. Stoker, Discovery, British National Antarctic Expedition.
1904	John D. Walker, R.N.	Posthumous. Bronze. Antarctic 1902-1904. Seaman, Discovery, British National Antarctic Expedition.
1904	G. Bilsby	Bronze. Antarctic 1902-1904. Carpenter, Morning, British National Antarctic Expedition.
1904	L. Burgess	Bronze. Antarctic 1902-1904. Able Seaman, Morning, British National Antarctic Expedition.
1904	F. W. Burton	Bronze. Antarctic 1902-1904. Able Seaman, Morning, British National Antarctic Expedition.
1904	A. Beaumont	Bronze. Antarctic 1902-1904. Able Seaman, Morning, British National Antarctic Expedition.
1904	Lieut. W. Colbeck, R.N.	Bronze. Antarctic 1902-1904. Commander, Morning, British National Antarctic Expedition.
1904	Alfred Cheetham	Bronze. Antarctic 1902-1904. Boatswain, Morning, British National Antarctic Expedition.
1904	A. Casement	Bronze. Antarctic 1902-1904. Able Seaman, Morning, British National Antarctic Expedition.
1904	James Arthur Chester	Bronze. Antarctic 1902-1904. Able Seaman, Morning, British National Antarctic Expedition.
1904	Midshipman G. S. Doorly, R.N.R.	Bronze. Antarctic 1902-1904. 3rd Officer, Morning, British National Antarctic Expedition.
1904	G. A. Davidson	Bronze. Antarctic 1902-1904. Surgeon, Morning, British National Antarctic Expedition.
1904	R. G. A. England	Bronze. Antarctic 1902-1904. 1st Officer, Morning, British National Antarctic Expedition.
1904	Lieut. Edgar Ratcliffe Garth Russell Evans, R.N.	Bronze. Antarctic 1902-1904. 2nd Officer, Morning, British National Antarctic Expedition.
1904	J. T. Good	Bronze. Antarctic 1902-1904. Boatswain's Mate, Morning, British National Antarctic Expedition.
1904	W. Hender	Bronze. Antarctic 1902-1904. Able Seaman, Morning, British National Antarctic Expedition.
1904	F. W. Kemp	Bronze. Antarctic 1902-1904. Fireman, Morning, British National Antarctic Expedition.
1904	G. R. W. Leary	Bronze. Antarctic 1902-1904. Able Seaman, Morning, British National Antarctic Expedition.
1904	Lieut. George Francis Arthur Mulock, R.N.	Bronze. Antarctic 1902-1904. 4th Officer, Morning, British National Antarctic Expedition.
1904	J. D. Morrison	Bronze. Antarctic 1902-1904. Engineer, Morning, British National Antarctic Expedition.
1904	W. J. Marsh	Bronze. Antarctic 1902-1904. 2nd Engineer, Morning, British National Antarctic Expedition.
1904	D. Nelson	Bronze. Antarctic 1902-1904. Fireman, Morning, British National Antarctic Expedition.
1904	A. N. Pepper	Bronze. Antarctic 1902-1904. Midshipman, Morning, British National Antarctic Expedition.
1904	J. Paton	Bronze. Antarctic 1902-1904. Able Seaman, Morning, British National Antarctic Expedition.
1904	George William Rolfe	Bronze. Antarctic 1902-1904. Sailmaker, Morning, British National Antarctic Expedition.
1904	O. Riley	Bronze. Antarctic 1902-1904. Able Seaman, Morning, British National Antarctic Expedition.
1904	F. L. A. Somerville	Bronze. Antarctic 1902-1904. Midshipman, Morning, British National Antarctic Expedition.
1904	A. Aiken	Bronze. Antarctic 1903-1904. Boatswain, Terra Nova, British National Antarctic Expedition.
1904	William Clark	Bronze. Antarctic 1903-1904. Assistant Cook, Terra Nova, British National Antarctic Expedition.
1904	J. Cooper	Bronze. Antarctic 1903-1904. Able Seaman, Terra Nova, British National Antarctic Expedition.
1904	T. Cosgrove	Bronze. Antarctic 1903-1904. Able Seaman, Terra Nova, British National Antarctic Expedition.
1904	J. Cairns	Bronze. Antarctic 1903-1904. Able Seaman, Terra Nova, British National Antarctic Expedition.
1904	J. Clark	Bronze. Antarctic 1903-1904. Able Seaman, Terra Nova, British National Antarctic Expedition.
1904	R. Christie	Bronze. Antarctic 1903-1904. Able Seaman, Terra Nova, British National Antarctic Expedition.
1904	R. W. Day	Bronze. Antarctic 1903-1904. 3rd Mate, Able Seaman, Terra Nova, British National Antarctic Expedition.
1904	J. Dair	Bronze. Antarctic 1903-1904. Able Seaman, Terra Nova, British National Antarctic Expedition.
1904	A. J. Elms	Bronze. Antarctic 1903-1904. 2nd Mate, Terra Nova, British National Antarctic Expedition.
1904	D. H. Frederick	Bronze. Antarctic 1903-1904. Able Seaman, Terra Nova, British National Antarctic Expedition.
1904	J. Frederick	Bronze. Antarctic 1903-1904. Fireman, Terra Nova, British National Antarctic Expedition.
1904	J. Grant	Bronze. Antarctic 1903-1904. Cook, Terra Nova, British National Antarctic Expedition.
1904	A. P. Jackson	Bronze. Antarctic 1903-1904. Chief Mate, Terra Nova, British National Antarctic Expedition.
1904	G. Lawrance	Bronze. Antarctic 1903-1904. Able Seaman, Terra Nova, British National Antarctic Expedition.
1904	H. McKay	Bronze. Antarctic 1903-1904. Master, Terra Nova, British National Antarctic Expedition.
1904	C McGregor	Bronze. Antarctic 1903-1904. 3rd Engineer, Terra Nova, British National Antarctic Expedition.
1904	E. Morrison	Bronze. Antarctic 1903-1904. Sailmaker, Terra Nova, British National Antarctic Expedition.
1904	Alexander Morrell	Bronze. Antarctic 1903-1904. Able Seaman, Terra Nova, British National Antarctic Expedition.
1904	A. McNeil	Bronze. Antarctic 1903-1904. Able Seaman, Terra Nova, British National Antarctic Expedition.
1904	D. J. Milne	Bronze. Antarctic 1903-1904. Fireman, Terra Nova, British National Antarctic Expedition.
1904	J. Reilly	Bronze. Antarctic 1903-1904. Able Seaman, Terra Nova, British National Antarctic Expedition.
1904	W. C. Souter	Bronze. Antarctic 1903-1904. Surgeon, Terra Nova, British National Antarctic Expedition.
1904	A. Sharp	Bronze. Antarctic 1903-1904. Chief Engineer, Terra Nova, British National Antarctic Expedition.
1904	W. Smith	Bronze. Antarctic 1903-1904. 2nd Engineer, Terra Nova, British National Antarctic Expedition.
1904	J. A. Shearer	Bronze. Antarctic 1903-1904. Assistant Steward, Terra Nova, British National Antarctic Expedition.
1904	A. Smith	Bronze. Antarctic 1903-1904. Carpenter, Terra Nova, British National Antarctic Expedition.
1904	A. Smith	Bronze. Antarctic 1903-1904. Carpenter's Mate, Terra Nova, British National Antarctic Expedition.
1904	B. Stannistreet	Bronze. Antarctic 1903-1904. Able Seaman, Terra Nova, British National Antarctic Expedition.
1904	M. Strachan	Bronze. Antarctic 1903-1904. Able Seaman, Terra Nova, British National Antarctic Expedition.
1904	S. Tasman	Bronze. Antarctic 1903-1904. Able Seaman, Terra Nova, British National Antarctic Expedition.
