= Penola =

Penola may refer to the following:

== Places ==
Antarctica

- Penola Island
- Penola Strait

Australia

- Penola, South Australia, a town and locality
- Penola Conservation Park, a protected area in South Australia
- Hundred of Penola, a cadastral unit in South Australia

United States

- Penola, Virginia, an unincorporated community in Virginia

== Ships ==
- Penola, a sailing ship used for the British Graham Land expedition
- SS Penola, a steamship

== Other ==
- Penola (fly), a genus of flies in the family Sphaeroceridae
- Penola Catholic College, a secondary school in Victoria, Australia
