= Quintin Riley =

British explorer & soldier (1905-1980)

Lieutenant-Commander Quintin Riley
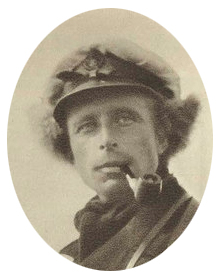
- Born: 27 October 1905; Little Petherick, Cornwall, England
- Died: 25 December 1980 (aged 75)
- Education: Lancing College
- Alma mater: Pembroke College, Cambridge
- Occupations: Explorer & soldier
- Known for: Riley Glacier, Antarctica
- Father: Athelstan Riley
- Military career
- Allegiance: United Kingdom
- Branch: Royal Navy
- Service years: 1938-1945
- Rank: Lieutenant-Commander
- Unit: No. 30 Commando
- Conflicts: World War II

Quintin Theodore Petroc Molesworth Riley (27 October 1905 – 25 December 1980) was a British Arctic explorer who was awarded the Polar Medal.

== Biography ==
Quintin Riley was born in 1905 in Little Petherick, Cornwall, the youngest son of the eminent Anglo-Catholic layman, Athelstan Riley. He was educated at Lancing College, where he met Gino Watkins (1907–1932). He continued his education at Pembroke College, Cambridge, where he graduated in 1927.

In 1930–31 Riley joined the British Arctic Air Route Expedition as a meteorologist. This expedition consisted in a team of fourteen men led by Watkins with the mission to survey and monitor weather conditions in the little explored east coast of Greenland. Barely a year later Riley returned to Greenland with the smaller 1932-33 East Greenland Expedition, led by Watkins as well. He was one of the only three remaining team members following Watkin's death at Tuttilik Fjord.

Riley next joined the 1934-1937 British Graham Land Expedition led by his former Greenland teammate John Rymill. In 1938 Riley joined the Royal Naval Volunteer Reserve and became active in Norway and Iceland – among other places – during World War II. Towards the end of WW2, Riley was appointed Commanding Officer of No. 30 Commando – the brainchild of Commander Ian Fleming.

Riley died in a road accident on Christmas Day 1980 while he was living in retirement in Essex.

== Honours ==
The Riley Glacier in Palmer Land, Antarctica, was named after him.

== See also ==
- Arctic exploration
- Freddie Spencer Chapman
