= Penola (yacht) =

Antarctic exploration vessel

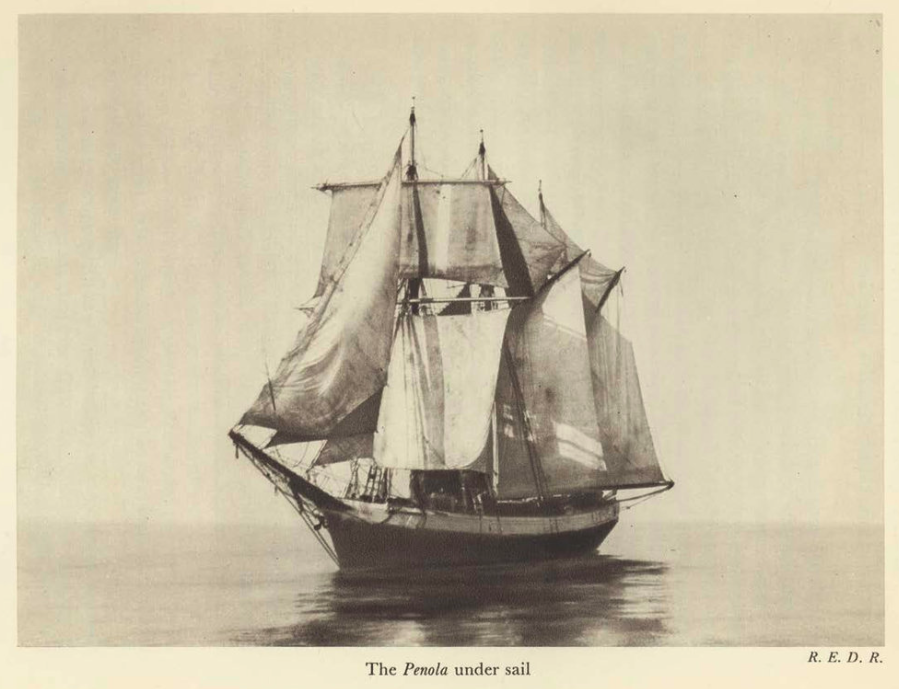
Research yacht Penola under sail

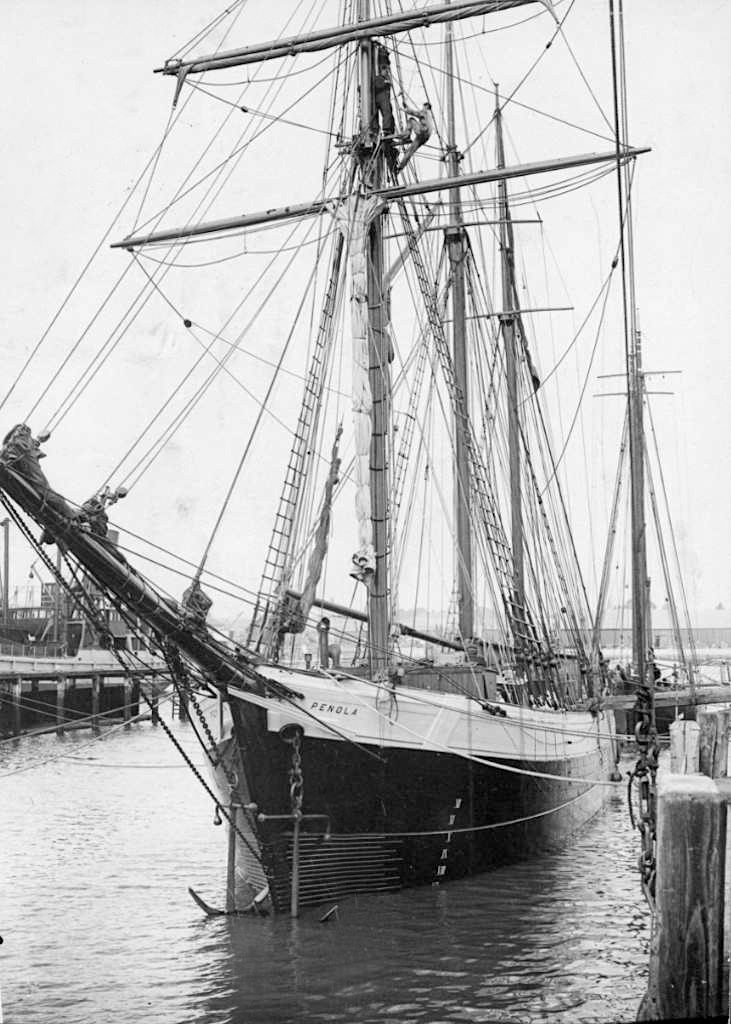
Research yacht Penola at dock

The Penola, originally laid down in Finisterre, Brittany, was a fishing schooner named Alcyon, and was later acquired by John Rymill for the British Graham Land Expedition to the Antarctic Peninsula in 1934.

Constructed in 1905 and launched in 1908 from the yard of E. Conne Kerity in France, this vessel boasted specifications well-suited for polar voyages. She measured 106 feet (32 m) at the waterline, had a beam of 24 feet (7.3 m), and a draft of 11 feet 6 inches (3.51 m), amounting to a tonnage of around 138 tons. In terms of her rigging, the ship was designed as a three-masted topsail schooner.

At some point she was purchased and converted into a private yacht named Navaho. For enhanced maneuverability and power, she was outfitted with two 50-horsepower Junkers diesel engines. Upon her acquisition for the expedition, Rymill renamed the vessel after his family farm, Penola, located in South Australia.

Given its robust construction, the Penola was inherently well-adapted for the challenges of the polar seas, and it had an impressive carrying capacity relative to her size.

The Penola (capable of a modest 4 knots) was the main transportation and most of the party travelled from England via the Falkland Islands and South Georgia to Antarctica in this vessel. The aircraft and dogs as well as a large part of the stores were, however, brought separately by a research ship, the RRS Discovery II.

In transit, an inspection of the Penola revealed that the timbers on which the engines were placed had warped while travelling through the tropics. Despite repairs, the engines began to move as the Penola sailed from the Falklands. The ship returned to collect concrete (so that a solid foundation could be made for engines when time allowed) and then set a course for Antarctica under sail. Penola reached Port Lockroy on 22 January 1935.

The expeditionary crew, predominantly amateur, consisted of 16 men led by John Rymill, an Australian, who also acted as surveyor and second pilot. The shore party of nine included several Cambridge graduates, some of whom had acquired experience of polar conditions in Greenland as members of the British Arctic Air Route Expedition led by Gino Watkins. Although the expedition's ship was mainly powered by sail, few of the crew members had sailing experience.

The exploration of south Graham Land was a problem considered by Gino Watkins after his return from Greenland in 1931, but he was unable to raise the necessary funds, and was forced to abandon the project. He returned to Greenland, accompanied by Riley, Chapman, and myself, and was drowned there. Thus it fell to the lot of his followers to carry on the work in the south. On returning to England at the conclusion of the Greenland expedition, I immediately set about organizing one to Graham Land. Four of my old companions from the Watkins expeditions agreed to join me: W. E. Hampton, who came as second-in-command and chief pilot; Surgeon Lieutenant-Commander E.W. Bingham, Royal Navy, doctor and in charge of dogs; Alfred Stephenson, chief surveyor and meteorologist; and Q. Riley, whose jobs were many, as he was commissariat officer, meteorologist, and in charge of the expedition motor boat. The expedition numbered sixteen altogether and was divided into two parties - the shore party and the ship's party.

— John Rymill, JSTOR

== Antarctic crew ==
- John Rymill, Expedition leader
- W.E. Hampton, Second-in-command and chief pilot
- Alfred Stephenson, Chief surveyor and meteorologist
- Colin Bertram, Biologist
- Ian Forbes Meiklejohn, Radio officer
- Brian Birley Roberts, CMG, Ornithologist
- Launcelot Fleming, KCVO, Geologist and chaplain
- Quintin Riley, Meteorologist
- E.W. Bingham, Expedition doctor
- Robert Ryder, RN, VC, Captain of the Penola
- Hugh Mainwaring Millet, RN, Chief Engineer of the Penola
- J.I. Moore, MBE, Second engineer
- J.H. Martin, Penola's mate
- L.C.D. Ryder, Second mate
- N. Gurney, Seaman
- Duncan Carse, Seaman

The budget for the three-year expedition was limited to the remarkably low sum of £20,000 (about £1.6M in 2023 terms), which had to include the cost of their ship and an aeroplane. It was only possible to finance BGLE with this constraint because all personnel were unpaid or were serving naval men on secondment.

== Notable crew members ==
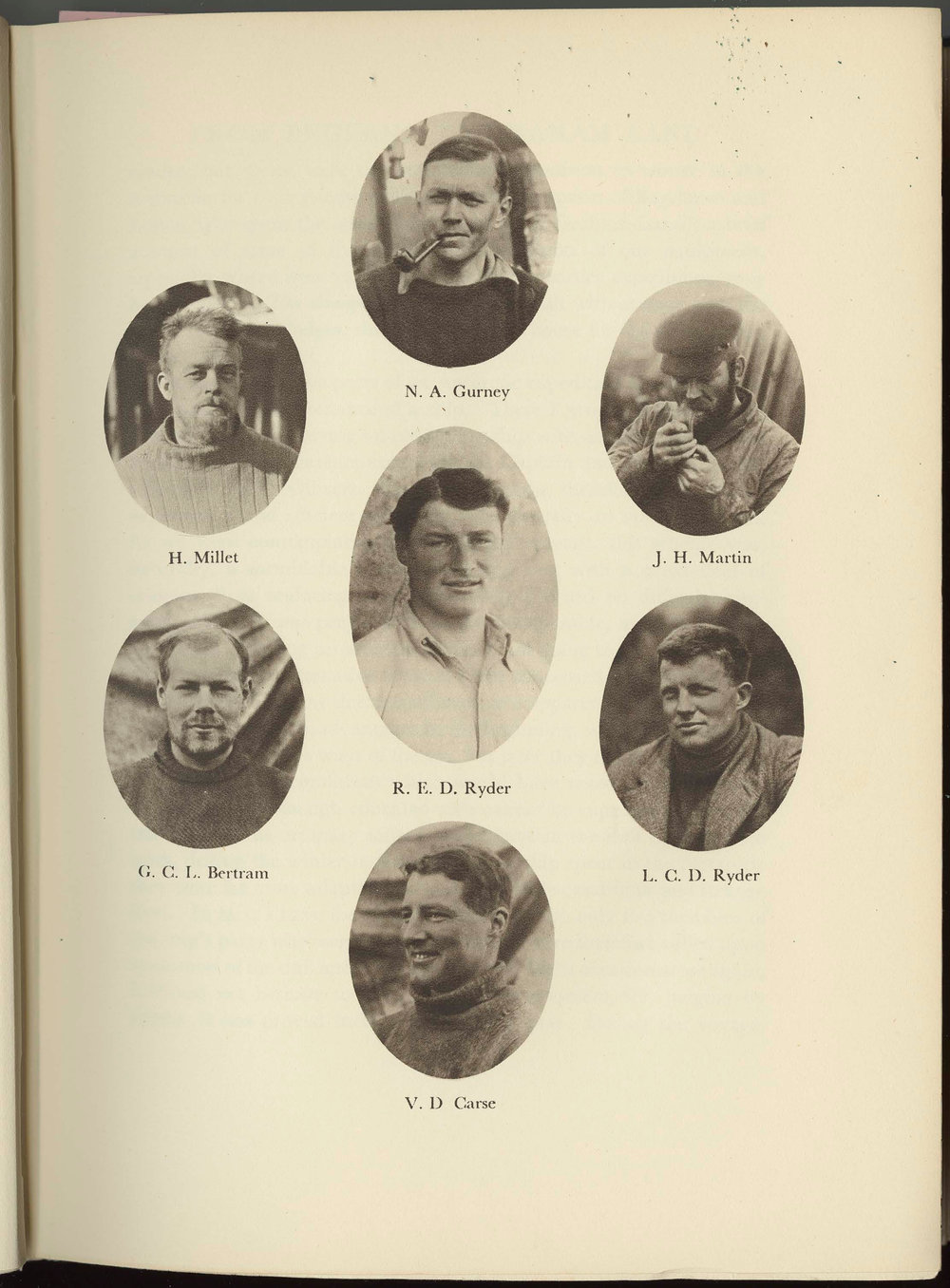
Nine of the sixteen members of the crew of the Penola.

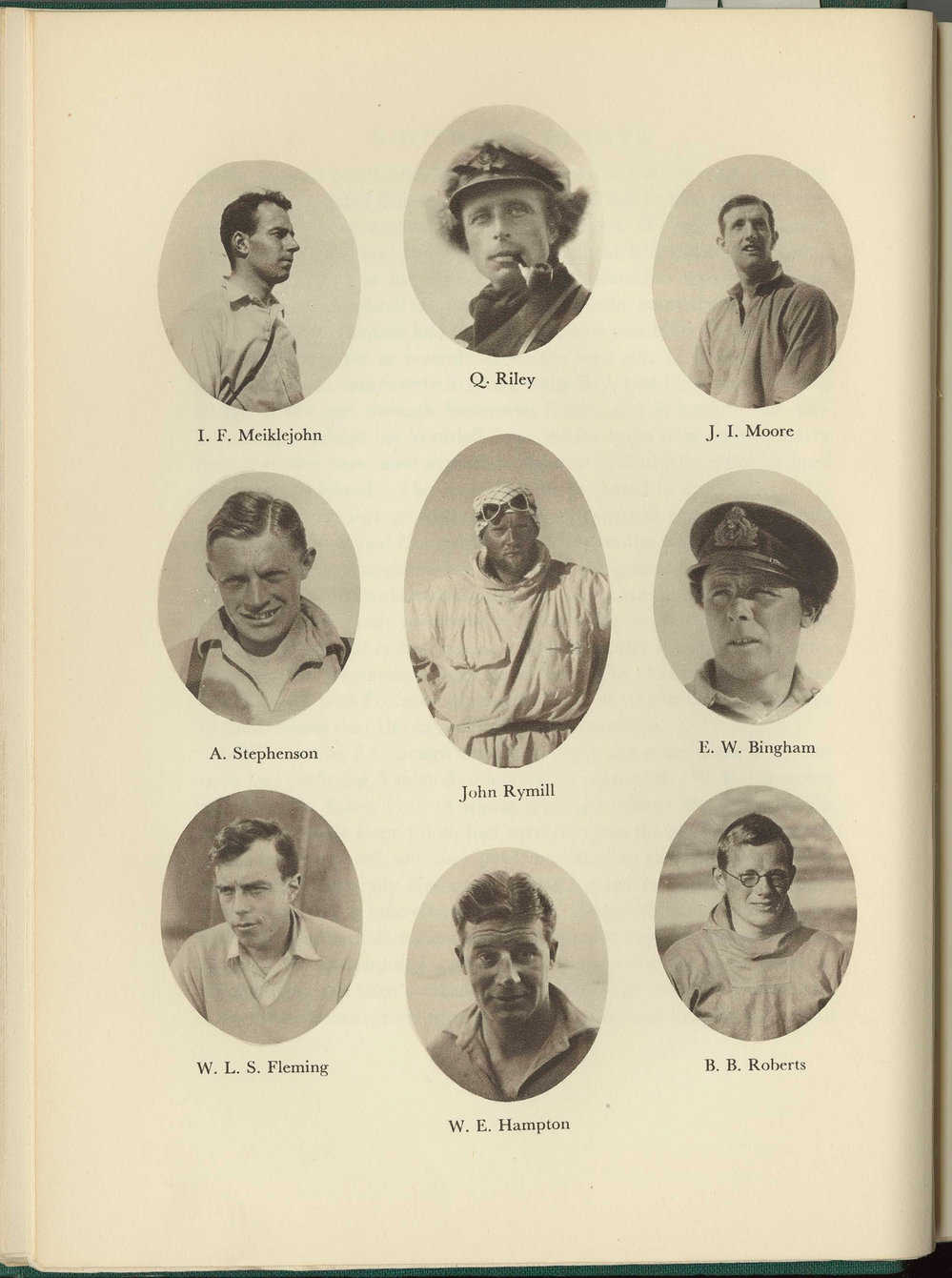
Seven of the sixteen members of the crew of the Penola.

- Colin Bertram initially carried out the task of marine biologist on the expedition ship Penola but then exchanged roles with the shore biologist.
- Ian Forbes Meiklejohn was born in 1907, he was educated at Wellington College and Royal Military Academy, Woolwich. In 1927 he was commissioned in the Royal Corps of Signals, advancing to the rank of lieutenant. He was seconded to the British Graham Land Expedition, 1934-1937 (leader John Rymill), as wireless officer in addition to operating the camera during aerial surveys. The UK Antarctic Place-Names Committee named the Meiklejohn Glacier after him in 1954.
- William Launcelot Scott Fleming was a British Anglican bishop. He was the Bishop of Portsmouth and later the Bishop of Norwich. He was also noted as a geologist and explorer. Part-time director of the Scott Polar Research Institute from 1946 to 1949.
- Edward W. Bingham went to Antarctica with the 1934-1937 British Graham Land Expedition, led by his former BAARE teammate John Rymill, as medical officer aboard the Penola. He was also in charge of the dog sled teams.
- Robert Ryder ("Red") was a naval officer, recipient of the Victoria Cross, and sailing master, was born at Dehra Dun in Northern India on 16 February 1908 to Colonel Charles Henry Dudley Ryder (b.1868 d.1945) CB, CIE, DSO, Surveyor General of India, and Ida Josephine Grigg (b.1872 m.1892 d.1948). He was a great-grandson of Henry Ryder (successively Bishop of Gloucester, from 1815, and Bishop of Lichfield and Coventry, from 1824) – who was the youngest son of Nathaniel Ryder, First Baron Harrowby. He was the Captain of the Penola and considered mastering the seamanship skills required by the Penola to have been his greatest achievement.
- Hugh Mainwaring Millett was born in Gibraltar in 1903, the son of Helen Millett née Cavenagh (1877–1918) and Thompson Horatio Millett (1870–1920), a Royal Navy paymaster. Millett was responsible for the expedition's engines, an important and technically challenging task. A fellow member of the expedition described him as “a man of great mechanical ingenuity”, in the circumstances no doubt highly valued.
- Lisle Charles Dudley Ryder was educated at Cheltenham College and Sandhurst Military College and received a commission in the Royal Norfolk Regiment in 1922. He was seconded to the British Graham Land expedition to the Antarctic (1934 to 1937). He sailed on this expedition as a second mate. His younger brother Robert Ryder was captain. By his knowledge of small boats and his considerable skill as a shipwright, he contributed very considerably to the work of the expedition. Not only did he effect major alterations and repairs to the Penola during her long voyage but he always willingly undertook to make in his tiny workshop all those items which were required by members of the expedition.
- Duncan Carse joined the Merchant Navy and sailed for the Southern Ocean aboard the RRS Discovery II in 1933. While in Port Stanley, Falkland Islands, Carse encountered the British Graham Land Expedition, which was on its way to Antarctica via the Penola. Carse secured permission to transfer to the expedition, serving as a seaman and wireless operator and helping to lay depots on the Antarctic Peninsula. Carse returned to England in 1937, and in 1939 he was awarded the silver Polar Medal and Clasp for his part in the Graham Land expedition.

== Post-expedition ==
=== Historical significance ===
The name of Penola Island, located in the South Shetland Islands, like that of the Penola Strait, is taken from the ship Penola, which was used in John Rymill's British Graham Land Expedition from 1934 to 1937. The expedition played a crucial role in determining that Graham Land was not an archipelago but a peninsula.

The naming likely took place during the expedition. Naming geographic features after vessels, especially in regions like Antarctica, is a longstanding tradition, reflecting the historical significance of exploration and discovery.

==== Geographical naming examples ====
- Robert Falcon Scott and the Terra Nova Expedition (1910-1913)
  - Named after his vessel, the Terra Nova, there's the Terra Nova Bay in Victoria Land.
- Ernest Shackleton and the Endurance Expedition (1914-1917)
  - Although the Endurance was trapped and crushed by ice, its story is iconic. There's the Endurance Glacier on Elephant Island, named after the vessel.
- James Clark Ross and the Erebus and Terror Expedition (1839-1843)
  - Ross named two volcanoes after his ships: Mount Erebus and Mount Terror on Ross Island.

=== The remains of the Penola ===
After the completion of the British Graham Land Expedition, the Penola returned to the UK and was purchased in 1938 in Amble by the Vyner family (or the Fountains Abbey Settlers' Society) from Yorkshire who utilized her as a grain or timber carrier between their small Highland estate of Isle Martin, Loch Broom and Liverpool.

On the morning of 2 November 1940, as the Penola sailed up the Firth of Clyde, she was in collision with another vessel off Toward Point. The Penola began to fill and was run ashore west of the lighthouse, the crew took to the lifeboat and made their way safely to the shore. The Penola, which settled upright with masts and part of her aft deck above water at high tide, later broke up and became a total wreck. Her remains are charted and lie in shallow water in approximate position 55° 51.725’N, 04° 59.886’W, just west of Toward Lighthouse.

Wreckage has been located close to the above position consisting of engine parts and keel section lying in 3 to 5 metres (9.8–16.4 ft) of water. The seabed is rock with large boulders covered in thick kelp and is very difficult to search.

In 1940 or 1941 as a young gunner stationed at Toward Point Battery located on the Cowal Peninsula near the village of Toward in Argyll and Bute on the river Clyde in Scotland on one rather stormy day a vessel identified as the Penola sailing up the Clyde drifted on to our foreshore and, turning broadside on, grounded.

The crew, presumably considering the ship could not be salvaged, abandoned ship and departed, complete with the ship's cat.

During the next few weeks the Penola slowly broke up and soon it was as though it had never been.

What I remember mainly and why this stayed in my mind was that a gunner who was manning a rather ancient machine gun on a stand adjacent to the heavy guns looked at me as I walked past him and said "It wasn't me!"

— Wilfred Ellis, late Royal Artillery, State Library of South Australia
