= Cornet Island =

Island in the Biscoe Islands of Antarctica

Cornet Island (65°34′S 64°58′W) is an island 1.5 nautical miles (3 km) northeast of Milnes Island along the west side of the Grandidier Channel, in the Biscoe Islands. It was first charted by the British Graham Land Expedition of 1934–1937 under John Rymill. The name, given by the UK Antarctic Place-Names Committee in 1959, is descriptive of the island's shape when seen from the air.

== See also ==
- List of Antarctic and sub-Antarctic islands
