= Mount Courtauld =

Mountain in Antarctica

Mount Courtauld (70°21′S 67°28′W) is a rounded, mainly ice-covered mountain, 2,105 metres (6,900 ft) high, standing 9 nautical miles (17 km) east of George VI Sound and the rocky ridge marking the north side of the mouth of Naess Glacier, on the west coast of Palmer Land. It was first surveyed in 1936 by the British Graham Land Expedition (BGLE) under John Rymill, and named by the UK Antarctic Place-Names Committee in 1954 for Augustine Courtauld, a British Arctic explorer who was of assistance during the organization of the BGLE, 1934–37.
