= Milnes Island =

Island in Antarctica

Milnes Island (65°35′S 65°2′W) is an island lying 2 nautical miles (4 km) north of Woolpack Island, in the Biscoe Islands of Antarctica. It was charted by the British Graham Land Expedition under John Rymill, 1934–37, and was named by the UK Antarctic Place-Names Committee in 1959 for Leading Seaman Arthur R. Milnes, Royal Navy, a member of the British Naval Hydrographic Survey Units in the area in 1956–57 and 1957–58.

== See also ==
- List of Antarctic and sub-Antarctic islands
