= Lemon Range =

Mountain range in Greenland

- Lemon Bjerge
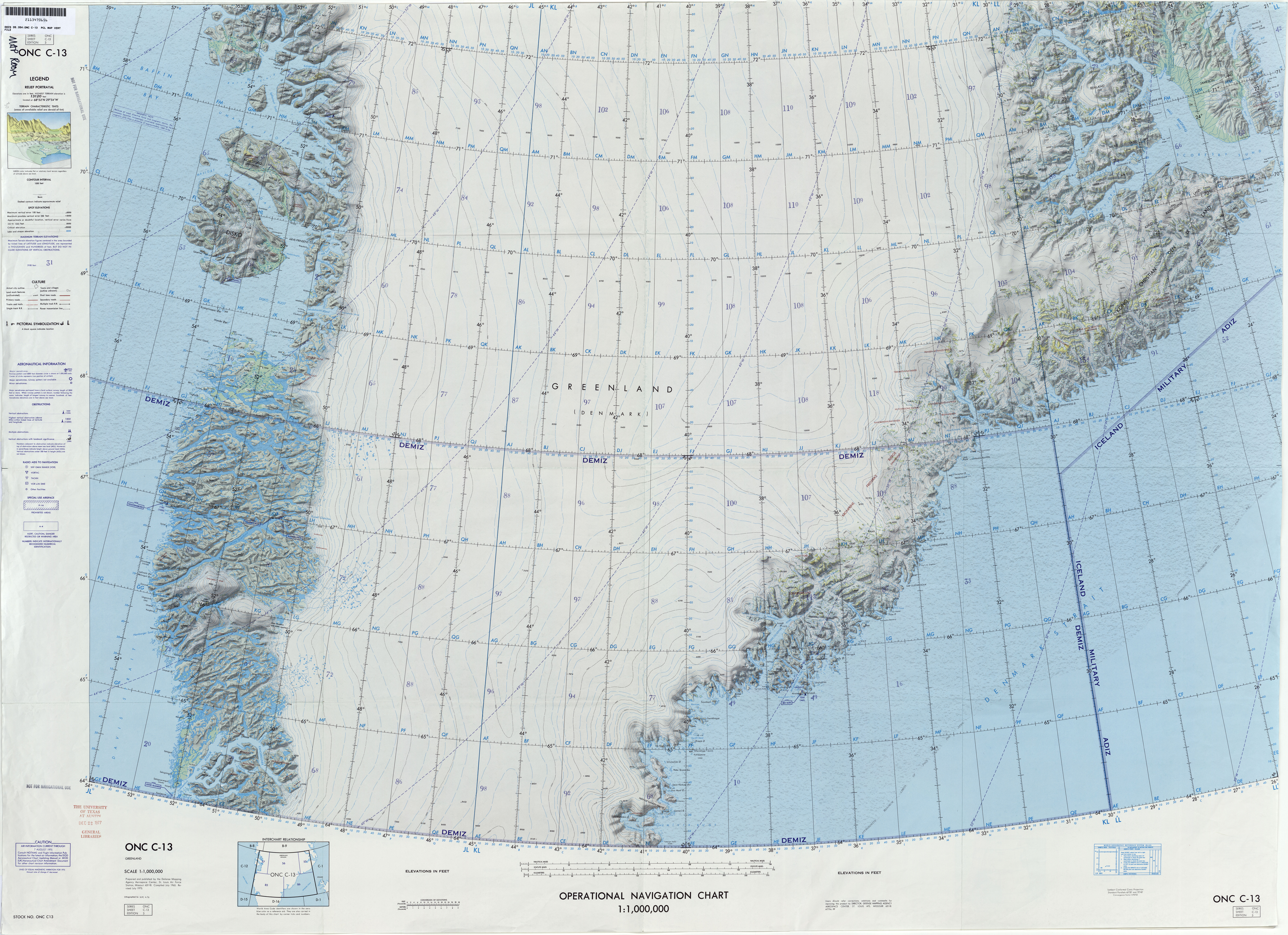
- Defense Mapping Agency map of Greenland sheet showing on the right the area of the Lemon Range.

Highest point
- Peak: Actress
- Elevation: 2,514 m (8,248 ft)

Dimensions
- Length: 38 km (24 mi) N/S
- Width: 21 km (13 mi) E/W
- Area: 700 km^{2} (270 mi^{2})

Geography
- Location within Greenland
- Country: Greenland
- Range coordinates: 68°35′N 31°51′W

The Lemon Range or Lemon Mountains (Danish: Lemon Bjerge) is a mountain range in King Christian IX Land, eastern Greenland. Administratively this range is part of the Sermersooq Municipality.

== History ==
The range was named by Gino Watkins after Captain Percy Lemon (1898–1932) of the Royal Corps of Signals, a member of the 1930-31 British Arctic Air Route Expedition led by Watkins.

Although not as high as the Watkins Range to the east or the Lindbergh Range to the northeast, the Lemon Range has become a popular place among climbers because it has some of the steepest rock peaks in Greenland and the quality of the granite is good. A number of the main summits of the range were climbed for the first time by Chris Bonington in the 1990s.

== Geography ==
The Lemon Range is an up to 2,500 m high mountain massif made up of nunataks. It is located among the glaciers east of Courtauld Glacier which has its terminus in the Cortauld Fjord, an arm of Kangerlussuaq Fjord, East Greenland, and west of Frederiksborg Glacier which flows roughly southwards with its terminus in the Watkins Fjord further south. The area of the range is uninhabited.

=== Mountains ===
- Actress (2,514 m); highest peak at 68°35′22″N 31°50′23″W
- Beacon (2,077 m)
- Bidvest Peak (1,915 m)
- The Castle (1,798 m)
- Chisel (2,300 m)
- The Citadel (2,275 m)
- Coxcomb (1,970 m)
- Domkirkebjerget (2,458 m), peak cluster; highest peak known as 'The Cathedral'.
- Ivory Tower (1,974 m)
- Mejslen (2,083 m)
- Mitivagkat (1,893 m)
- Muezzin (1,771 m)
- The Needle (1,701 m)
- The Pulpit (2,110 m)
- The Scalpel (2,161 m)
- Solstice Peak (1,750 m)
- The Spire (2,260 m)
- The Steeple (2,360 m)
- The Vestry (2,215 m)

=== Glaciers ===
Besides the Courtauld Glacier and Frederiksborg Glacier that limit the range, the following glaciers lie within the boundaries of the Lemon Mountains:

- Chisel Glacier
- Coxcomb Glacier
- Hedgehog Glacier
- Porpoise Glacier
- Sarah Glacier
- Sidegetscher

== Climate ==
Polar climate prevails in the region. The average annual temperature in the area of the Lemon Range is -14 °C. The warmest month is July when the average temperature reaches -2 °C and the coldest is February when the temperature sinks to -22 °C.

== See also ==
- List of mountain ranges of Greenland
