= Lindbergh Range =

Mountain range in Greenland

- Lindbergh Fjelde
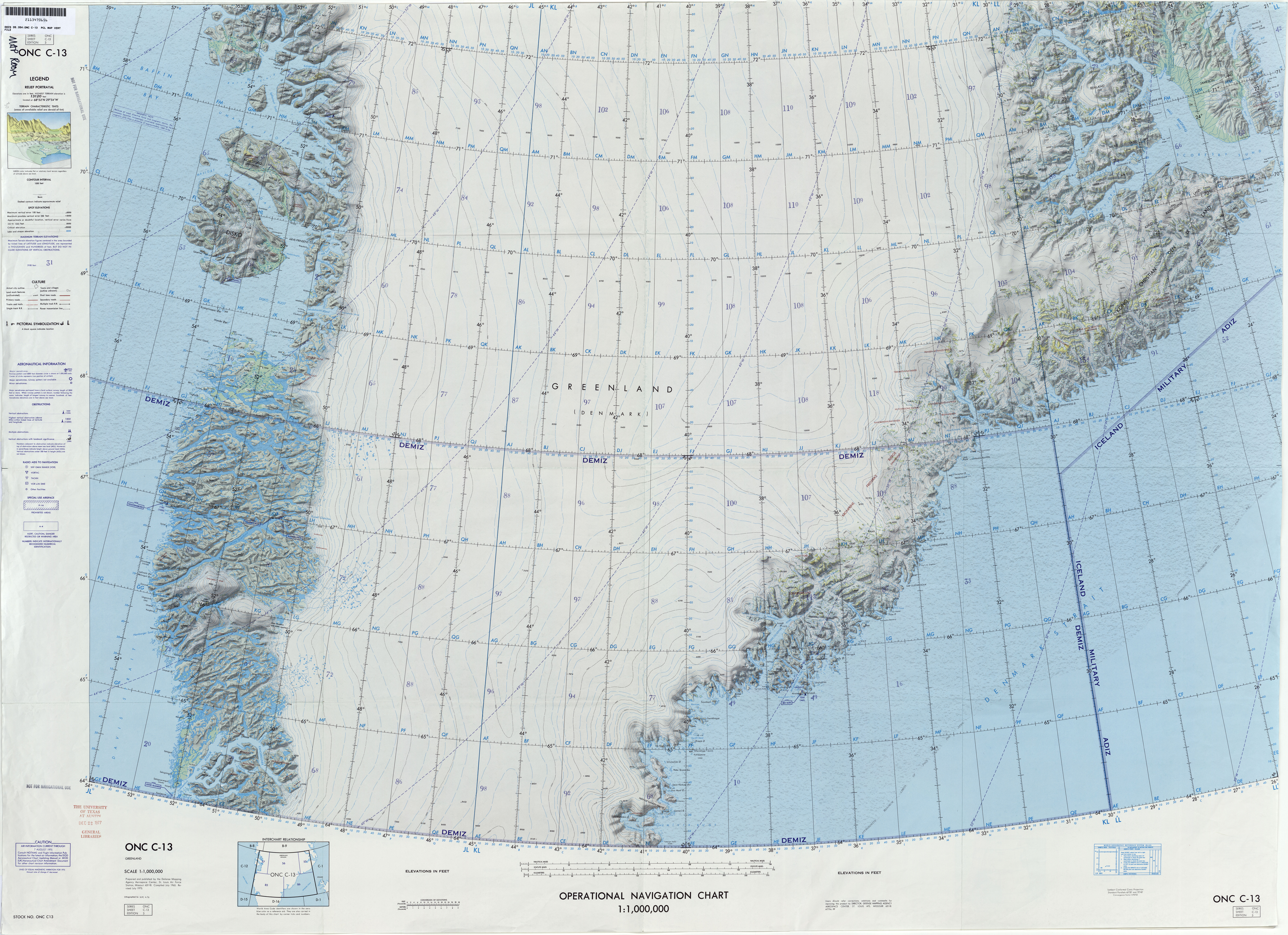
- Defense Mapping Agency map of Greenland sheet showing on the right the area of the range.

Highest point
- Peak: Snebordet
- Elevation: 3,171 m (10,404 ft)

Dimensions
- Length: 60 km (37 mi) NE/SW
- Width: 30 km (19 mi) NW/SE
- Area: 1,500 km^{2} (580 mi^{2})

Geography
- Location within Greenland
- Country: Greenland
- Range coordinates: 69°0′N 30°55′W

The Lindbergh Range or Lindbergh Nunataks (Danish: Lindbergh Fjelde or Lindbergh Nunatakker) is a mountain range in King Christian IX Land, eastern Greenland. Administratively the range is part of the Sermersooq Municipality.

== History ==
The range was observed and mapped in 1933 by Lauge Koch during aerial surveys made in the course of the 1931–34 Three-year Expedition to East Greenland. Koch named it after pioneering aviator Charles Augustus Lindbergh (1902–1974), who reportedly had seen these tall nunataks previously during an eastward flight across the Greenland Ice Sheet and had discussed the matter with him when they met in Ella Island.

Although not as high as the Watkins Range to the east, the Lindbergh Range is popular among mountaineers because it has some of the finest and tallest peaks in Greenland. The quality of the rock, however, is poor. A number of the main summits of the nunataks have been climbed in recent years, but the range is still relatively little explored.

== Geography ==
The Lindbergh Range is an up to 3,171 m high cluster of nunataks, some of which are extensive ridges rising above the ice. It is located west of the Christian IV Glacier and east of the Upper Frederiksborg Glacier (Øvre Frederiksborg Gletscher), an ice cap west of which lie the Frederiksborg Nunataks, located north of the Frederiksborg Glacier. The Isfald Glacier is a smaller glacier located at the southern end. The vast Greenland Ice Sheet lies to the northwest.

The Watkins Range rises to the east of the Lindbergh Range, beyond the Christian IV Glacier, the Gronau Nunataks lie to the northeast, and the Lemon Range to the southwest. The area of the range is uninhabited.

=== Mountains ===
- Snebordet (3,160 m); highest peak of the range at 68°57′33″N 30°50′32″W
- Trillingerne, a small group of nunataks in the SW, all with high summits; highest peak 3,020 m.
- Jætteborg (2,919 m); in the same ridge as Snebordet, but further to the south

== Climate ==
Polar climate prevails in the region. The average annual temperature in the area of the Lindbergh Range is -17 °C. The warmest month is July when the average temperature reaches -5 °C and the coldest is February when the temperature sinks to -19 °C.

== See also ==
- List of mountain ranges of Greenland
- List of mountains of Greenland
- List of Nunataks of Greenland
