= Freddie Spencer Chapman =

British Army officer and World War II veteran

Freddie Spencer Chapman DSO & Bar, ED
- Born: Frederick Spencer Chapman; 10 May 1907; London, England
- Died: 8 August 1971 (aged 64); Reading, England
- Occupation: Soldier
- Spouse: Faith Townson
- Children: 3

Frederick Spencer Chapman (10 May 1907 – 8 August 1971) was a British Army officer and World War II veteran, most famous for his exploits behind enemy lines in Japanese occupied Malaya. His medals include the Distinguished Service Order and Bar, and the Polar Medal. He also received several unofficial awards: the Gill Memorial Medal, Mungo Park Medal, and the Lawrence of Arabia Medal.

== Early life and education ==
Both of Chapman's parents died whilst he was still a young child. His mother, Winifred Ormond, died shortly after his birth in Kensington London and his father, Frank Spencer Chapman, was killed at the Battle of the Somme; Freddie (or sometimes Freddy as he was to become known) and his older brother, Robert, were cared for by an elderly clergyman and his wife in the village of Cartmel, on the edge of the Lake District. Chapman developed an early interest in nature and the outdoors. As a boy he was, by his own account, 'first a mad-keen butterfly collector, then a wild-flower enthusiast, and at last a bird-watcher'. These were continuing interests throughout his school years and into his adult life.

At the age of 8, "after a disastrous term in the kindergarten of a girls' school in Kendal [then Westmorland, now Cumbria], I was sent to a private school at Ben Rhydding, on the edge of the Yorkshire Moors. The headmaster – a man of infinite kindness and understanding- was an enthusiastic entomologist... [and] I left Private School with a good knowledge of gardening and a vast enthusiasm for all forms of natural history."

When Chapman was 14 years old he went to Sedbergh School in Yorkshire, but did not excel in any of his chosen subjects. Chapman, in his own words, "loathed the monotonous bell-regulated routine of school life" and considered lessons as "things to be avoided by all possible means, fair or foul, and organised games were a waste of a fine afternoon.". He preferred to be out walking and climbing in the surrounding fells. This eventually resulted in Chapman being excused by the headmaster – whom Chapman described as wise and sympathetic to his cause – from having to participate in organised sports, especially cricket, as long as he did not waste his time. Chapman used this time to explore the local area on foot.

Whilst at Sedbergh School, Chapman won a Kitchener Scholarship to St John's College, Cambridge, in 1926, to study history and English. It was there that he developed his passion for adventure and, by the end of his university years, had already completed several overseas excursions including a climbing expedition in the Alps and a journey to Iceland to study plant and bird life. It was here that he met, and was inspired by, the great mountaineer Geoffrey Winthrop Young, and joined the Cambridge University Mountaineering Club (CUMC).

== Expeditions ==
Chapman was attached as "ski expert and naturalist" to Gino Watkins' 1930–31 British Arctic Air Route Expedition. Expedition members included John Rymill and Augustine Courtauld. He also joined Watkins' subsequent fatal Greenland Expedition of 1932–33, which was led by Rymill after Watkins' death. Chapman experienced cold of such intensity that he lost all his finger and toe nails. He spent twenty hours in a storm at sea in his kayak and at one point fell into a deep crevasse, saving himself by holding onto the handles of his dog sled. He later led a three-man team across the desolate Greenland ice-cap. The first European to do this since Nansen, he became fluent in the Inuit language and was an able kayaker and dog sledger. Chapman, with the other expedition members, was awarded the Polar Medal, with the clasp Arctic 1930–1931, after the successful first expedition.

In between the Greenland Expeditions he attempted what was to become the Bob Graham Round fell running challenge, 70 miles (112.7 km) and 30,000 feet (9,100 m) of climbing in the English Lake District Fells, his time of 25 hours was not however a record.

Gino Watkins forged an esprit de corps within his expeditions, bringing together a mix of men and Cambridge students. Many of these expedition members would later go on to become notable during the Second World War, including Martin Lindsay, Augustine Courtauld, and Chapman himself.

Early in 1936, he joined a Himalayan climbing expedition. He was not only a keen mountaineer but studied the history of mountaineering, Dr Kellas being amongst his heroes. He enjoyed difficult climbs and met Basil Gould, the Political Officer for Sikkim, Bhutan and Tibet. Gould invited Spencer to be his private secretary on his political mission, from July 1936 to February 1937, to persuade the Panchen Lama to return from China and establish permanent British representation in Lhasa. Spencer struggled to learn Tibetan, learning it well enough to converse. He was involved in cypher work, kept a meteorological log, pressed six hundred plants, dried seeds, and made notes on bird life. He kept a diary of "events" in Lhasa and took many photographs that were sent to India on a weekly basis. He was allowed to wander and did so in an unshepherded way into the middle of Tibet and around the Holy City.

After his return from Lhasa, Chapman obtained permission to lead a five-man expedition from Sikkim to the holy mountain Chomolhari, which the British group had passed on the way from Sikkim to Tibet in July 1936. Chapman and Sherpa Pasang Dawa Lama succeeded to become the first mountaineers to climb the 7314 m high peak, which they finally reached from the Bhutanese side after finding the route from the Tibetan side impassable. The mountain would not be climbed again until 1970.

In 1938 Spencer taught at Gordonstoun School where Prince Philip was one of his pupils.

== Malaya ==
He was commissioned into the 5th Battalion of Seaforth Highlanders as a lieutenant on 6 June 1939, and was soon chosen for a mission in Australia to train Australian and New Zealand forces in guerrilla warfare in Wilsons Promontory and eventually to join what was then Special Training School 101 (STS 101) in Singapore (set up by SOE). One of the main objects of this school was the organisation of parties to stay behind in areas the Japanese might overrun. In August 1941, a plan for stay-behind parties that would include local Indians, Chinese and Malays was proposed, but this was rejected by the British colonial governor, Sir Shenton Thomas, as extravagant and defeatist. Had permission been granted, Chapman speculated that the effect of the trained guerrilla forces would have delayed the Japanese invasion long enough for British reinforcements to arrive in Singapore, and Singapore might not have fallen.

During the Japanese invasion the then Captain Chapman took part in an undercover raid across the Perak River in support of Rose Force. During the mission Chapman noticed how lightly equipped the Japanese soldiers were in contrast to the heavy kit of the British and Indian forces. He noted they had little standard issue equipment other than raincoats which had a hood and covered the bikes they were riding, allowing them to continue cycling in the rain.

In early 1942, Chapman ran out of the supplies that had been hidden for stay-behind parties such as his team. Chapman and his team then tried to escape from Malaya, but had to hide from the Japanese in the Malayan jungle with the help of the Malayan Chinese Communists led by Chin Peng who lived in guerrilla camps in the jungle, waging war with the Japanese. However, due to the difficult jungle terrain and also due to Japanese attacks, or by leading search parties for lost members, he gradually lost all his team members through disease and gunfire and was completely cut off. For more than one and a half years, he had to live in jungle camps with Chinese Communist guerrillas, traveling long distances through dense and difficult jungles while often suffering high fevers caused by malaria.

In late 1943, Chapman finally re-established contact with the British. Two other Britons joined him from Force 136. On a search mission in the jungle for another stay-behind-Briton, Chapman was captured by the Japanese but managed to escape back into the jungle during the night, despite being surrounded by Japanese soldiers, who were asleep as well as several on guard. The Japanese had confiscated a number of his possessions including many of his natural scientific observations in diaries, which he requested (via a letter to the Japanese Governor General) be sent to the Royal Geographical Society of London should they be found, although they were never returned.

Due to continued Japanese attacks, Chapman and the two members of Force 136, John Davis and Richard Broome, were isolated again among the Communist guerrillas until early 1945. During that time, they had to fight against jungle diseases, namely, malaria, beriberi, dysentery and skin ulcers from leech bites. Finally, with the help of the Malayan Chinese Communists, they managed to repair first their radio receiver (using car batteries charged with a pedal dynamo) and secondly their radio transmitter equipment with spare parts collected by the Communist guerrillas (the military wing of this being the Malayan Peoples' Anti-Japanese Army). They were able to contact their headquarters in Colombo to organise reinforcements and supplies via parachute drops into the jungle. Subsequently, they could support British liaisons with the Malayan Chinese Communist guerrillas, and managed to escape from occupied Malaya in the submarine HMS Statesman after a trek from the mainland jungle to the island Pulau Pangkor Laut off the west coast disguised as Chinese labourers.

Chapman was wounded twice during his time in Malaya, once in the leg by a steel nut from a homemade cartridge and once in the arm. He was captured both by Japanese troops and by Chinese bandits, escaping from both. Once he spent seventeen days in a semi coma, suffering from tick-typhus, blackwater fever, and pneumonia, with the effects of chronic malaria being the worst of it. However much he suffered in the Malayan jungle, Chapman attributed his survival to the basic rule that "the jungle is neutral", that one should view the surroundings as neither good or bad. The role of a survivalist is to expect nothing and accept the dangers and bounties of the jungle as of a natural course. Hence, one's steady state of mind was of the utmost importance to ensure that the physical health of body and the will to live were reinforced on a daily basis.

In the foreword to Chapman's book on his experiences in Japanese occupied Malaya, The Jungle Is Neutral, Field Marshal Earl Wavell wrote "Colonel Chapman has never received the publicity and fame that were his predecessor's lot [referring to T. E. Lawrence]; but for sheer courage and endurance, physical and mental, the two men stand together as examples of what toughness the body will find, if the spirit within it is tough; and as very worthy representatives of our national capacity for individual enterprise, which it is hoped that even the modern craze for regulating our lives in every detail will never stifle."

On 21 February 1946 Chapman was appointed to the Distinguished Service Order, backdated to 31 March 1944. A Bar followed on 7 November 1946. He retained a reserve commission until 4 December 1957, when he reached the age limit for service. He was belatedly awarded the Efficiency Decoration on 19 January 1970.

== Post-war ==
After the war, Chapman was asked to form a school in Germany for the sons and daughters of British Forces and Control Commission Civilians resident in the British Zone of occupied Germany. This school, the King Alfred School, Plön, for children 11 to 18 years of age, used the German naval establishment at Plön in Schleswig-Holstein where Admiral Dönitz had resided during the last days of World War II. Chapman, as headmaster, set up the school, organised the teachers, arranged for the alterations to accept both boys and girls, and then in one day in 1948 accepted 400 young boys and girls into what was possibly the first successful comprehensive, co-educational boarding school in the world. His dynamism and understanding of the requirements of young people were the guiding influence in setting up the school to become a first class success story which lasted for 11 years. He was relieved after its successful commencement, at which time he continued in educational work as Headmaster of St Andrew's College, Grahamstown, South Africa (1956–61) Then Warden at the Pestalozzi Children’s Village Sedlescombe between (1962–66) and Warden of Wantage Hall at the University of Reading (1966–71).

He was the subject of This Is Your Life in January 1964 when he was surprised by Eamonn Andrews at the BBC Television Theatre.

== Personal life ==
In 1946, Chapman married Faith Townson, daughter of a Hampshire farmer and a WAAF Flight Officer at the Church of the Redemption, New Delhi India and they had three children.

=== Death ===
Chapman suffered from frequent and severe back pain, as well as recurring stomach pain and headaches. Chapman committed suicide in his study at Wantage Hall, Reading on 8 August 1971, leaving a note for his wife reading, "I don't want you to have to nurse an invalid for the rest of my life."

Freeman adds, "despite leading such an extraordinary life, Chapman still felt unfulfilled. For someone who had always sought 'to experience the fullness of life, and the inner satisfaction that comes from facing and overcoming danger', old age [apparently] offered few pleasures.

== Reputation and legacy ==
The Pangkor Laut island resort has a memorial to Chapman, with a quotation from The Jungle is Neutral carved in black marble.

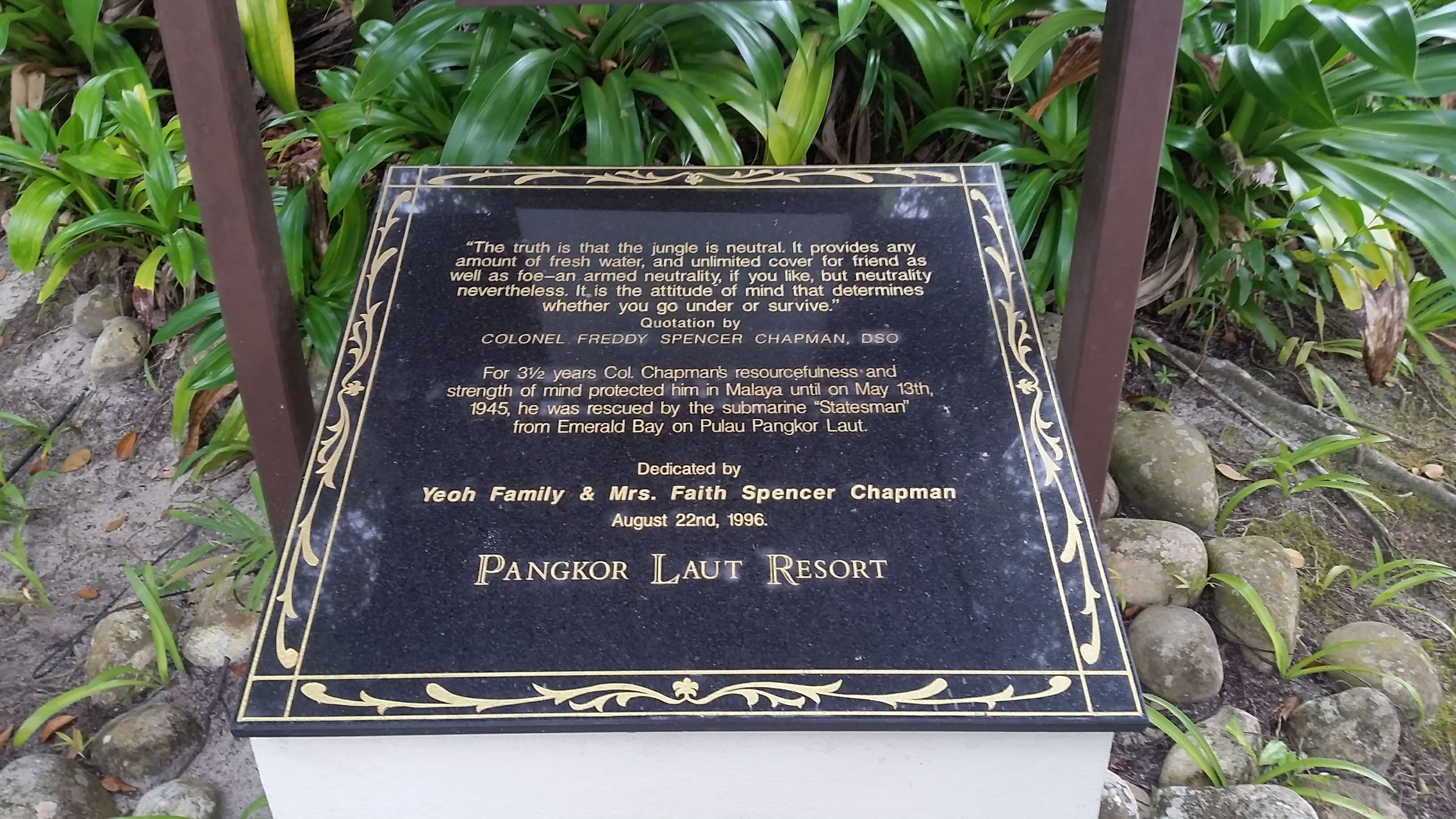
Chapman memorial at Pangkor Laut resort

The resort has a bar named 'Chapman's bar' in Emerald Bay (from where he swam to the submarine). The resort also hosts the 'Chapman Challenge', which includes a timed trek through the jungle and a swim. Each year descendants of Chapman have attended and even competed.

The Trans Spencer Chapman hiking trail in central Perak, covering 34 km, three mountains, and 2,550 m of elevation gain, is named in his honour.

== Publications ==
All books published by Chatto & Windus in London.

- Northern Lights: The Official Account of the British Arctic Air-Route Expedition 1930-1931, 1932.
- Watkins' Last Expedition, 1934.
- Lhasa: The Holy City, 1938.
- Helvellyn to Himalaya, 1940.
- Memoirs of a Mountaineer, 1945 (combined reprint of the above two).
- The Jungle is Neutral, 1949.
- Living Dangerously, 1953.
- Lightest Africa, 1955.

== See also ==
- Japanese Invasion of Malaya

== Sources ==
- Chapman, F. Spencer, The Jungle is Neutral (Chatto & Windus, 1949)
- Moynahan, Brian (2009). Jungle Soldier: The True Story of Freddy Spencer Chapman. Quercus. ISBN 978-1849160766.
- Thompson, Peter, The Battle for Singapore, London, 2005, ISBN 0-7499-5068-4 HB
- The Tibet Album – British photography in Central Tibet, 1920 – 50. Frederick Spencer Chapman
- The Red Dragons ( Magazines of King Alfred School Plõn 1948–1953 )
- Tan Chong Tee, Force 136, Story of a WWII resistance fighter, Asiapac Books, Singapore, 1995, ISBN 981-3029-90-0
