= Frederiksborg Glacier =

Glacier in Greenland

- Frederiksborg Gletscher
- Location within Greenland
- Type: Valley glacier
- Location: Greenland
- Coordinates: 68°28′N 31°41′W
- Terminus: Watkins Fjord; Kangerlussuaq Fjord; Denmark Strait

Frederiksborg Glacier (Danish: Frederiksborg Gletscher) is a glacier on the east coast of the Greenland ice sheet. It is named after Frederiksborg Castle in Denmark.

Administratively this glacier is part of the Sermersooq Municipality.

== History ==
In 1935–36, during the British East Greenland Expedition led by geologist Lawrence Wager, E. C. Chambers and Dr. P. B. Fountaine set up walking up the glacier on an exploratory journey but had to turn back because it was too badly crevassed.

== Geography ==
The Frederiksborg Glacier is a valley glacier that flows between high and rugged mountainous areas in a roughly north–south direction. It separates the Lemon Range in the west from the mountains that rise to the west of the Sorgenfri Glacier in the east.

In its upper reaches the glacier flows at the foot of Actress, the highest peak of the Lemon Range. Its terminus is at the head of the Watkins Fjord, one of the branches of the great Kangerlussuaq Fjord system of the East Greenland coast.

To the north of the Frederiksborg Glacier, there is the Upper Frederiksborg Glacier (Øvre Frederiksborg Gletscher), an ice cap west of which lie the Frederiksborg Nunataks located east of the Lindbergh Range.

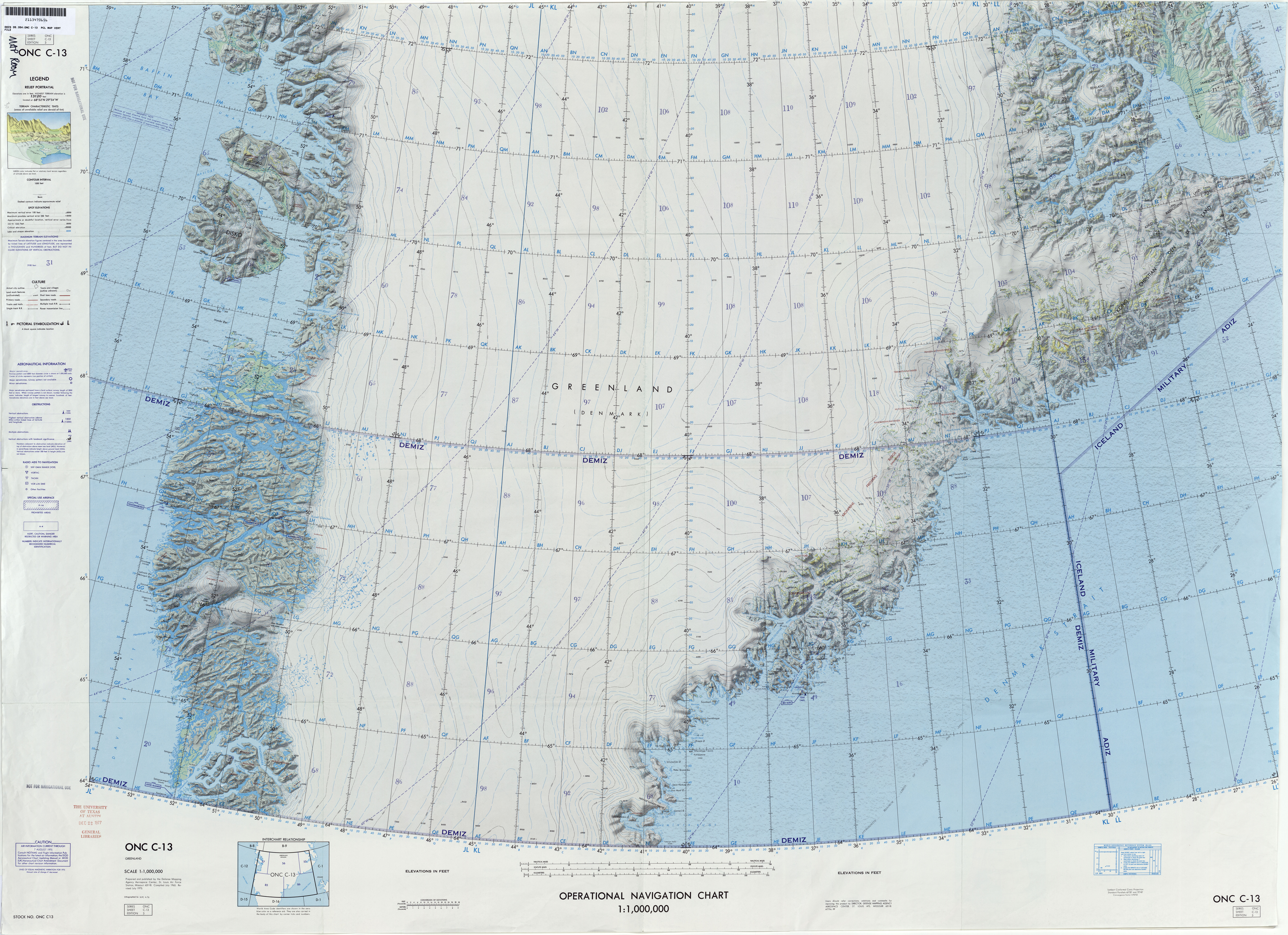
Defense Mapping Agency map of Greenland sheet showing the Frederiksborg Glacier.

== See also ==
- List of glaciers in Greenland
