= Woolpack Island =

Island in Antarctica

Woolpack Island (65°37′S 65°0′W) is a narrow island, 1.5 nautical miles (2.8 km; 1.7 mi) long, lying 4 nautical miles (7.4 km; 4.6 mi) northeast of Vieugue Island at the west side of Grandidier Channel, off the west coast of Graham Land, in the Antarctic Peninsula.

It was discovered and named by the British Graham Land Expedition, 1934–1937, led by John Rymill.

== See also ==
- List of Antarctic and sub-Antarctic islands
