= Tuttilik =

Fjord in Greenland

- Lake Fjord
- Location
- Location: E Greenland
- Coordinates: 66°19′N 34°55′W
- Ocean/sea sources: North Atlantic Ocean
- Basin countries: Greenland
- Max. length: 6.8 km (4.2 mi)
- Max. width: 2.1 km (1.3 mi)
- Settlements: Uninhabited

Tuttilik (old spelling Tugtilik), also known as Lake Fjord, is a fjord in the municipality of Sermersooq, southeastern Greenland.

Tundra climate prevails in the region of the fjord, the average annual temperature in the area being −6 °C (21 °F). The warmest month is July when the average temperature rises to 2 °C (36 °F) and the coldest is January with −15 °C (5 °F). The fjord is free of ice between July and October in average years.

== History ==
Tugtilik probably means "the place where the reindeer live" (tugto is Greenlandic for reindeer) and the river flowing into the fjord from the lake is rich in Arctic char. It is likely to have been settled by Inuit hunters for centuries. There are the remains of at least nine winter houses on the south and west side of the fjord, but all were abandoned by the 20th century.

Following the success of his British Arctic Air Route Expedition of 1930–31, Gino Watkins returned to Tugtilik, or as he called it, Lake Fjord, in 1932 on the East Greenland Expedition to continue the exploration work with a smaller team. A purpose of the expedition was to take metrological observations around the lake, the only place in the area where planes could land on skis or floats, without the hazard of icebergs and pack ice. On 20 August 1932, he would die in this fjord after he went hunting for seals in its waters. Later that day his empty kayak was found floating upside down by his companions. His body was never found.

A monument to Watkins stands on the rocky promontory between the main fjord and the westerly branch. The remains of the hunting hut of the 1932–33 East Greenland Expedition (Rejsehus) is at the head of the shallow western branch of the fjord.

== Geography ==
Tuttilik is a small fjord of the King Christian IX Land coast located east of Nigertuluk Fjord and south of the Southern K.J.V. Steenstrup Glacier. It extends in a roughly north/south direction for about 7 km (4 mi). The basin inside the fjord has steep mountains on both sides and the terminus of the glacier at the head of the fjord forms a 30 m (98 ft) high wall of ice. A 4 km (2 mi) long tributary fjord of the same width branches from the western shore of the main fjord about 2 km (1 mi) from the mouth. Watkins gave the name 'Lake Fjord' to the place after a 4 km (2 mi) long lake that lies a little inland to the west of the head of this branch.

To the south the fjord opens into the North Atlantic Ocean near Cape Wandel. Ailsa Island lies at the mouth of the fjord, named after Ailsa Craig in the Firth of Clyde in Scotland.

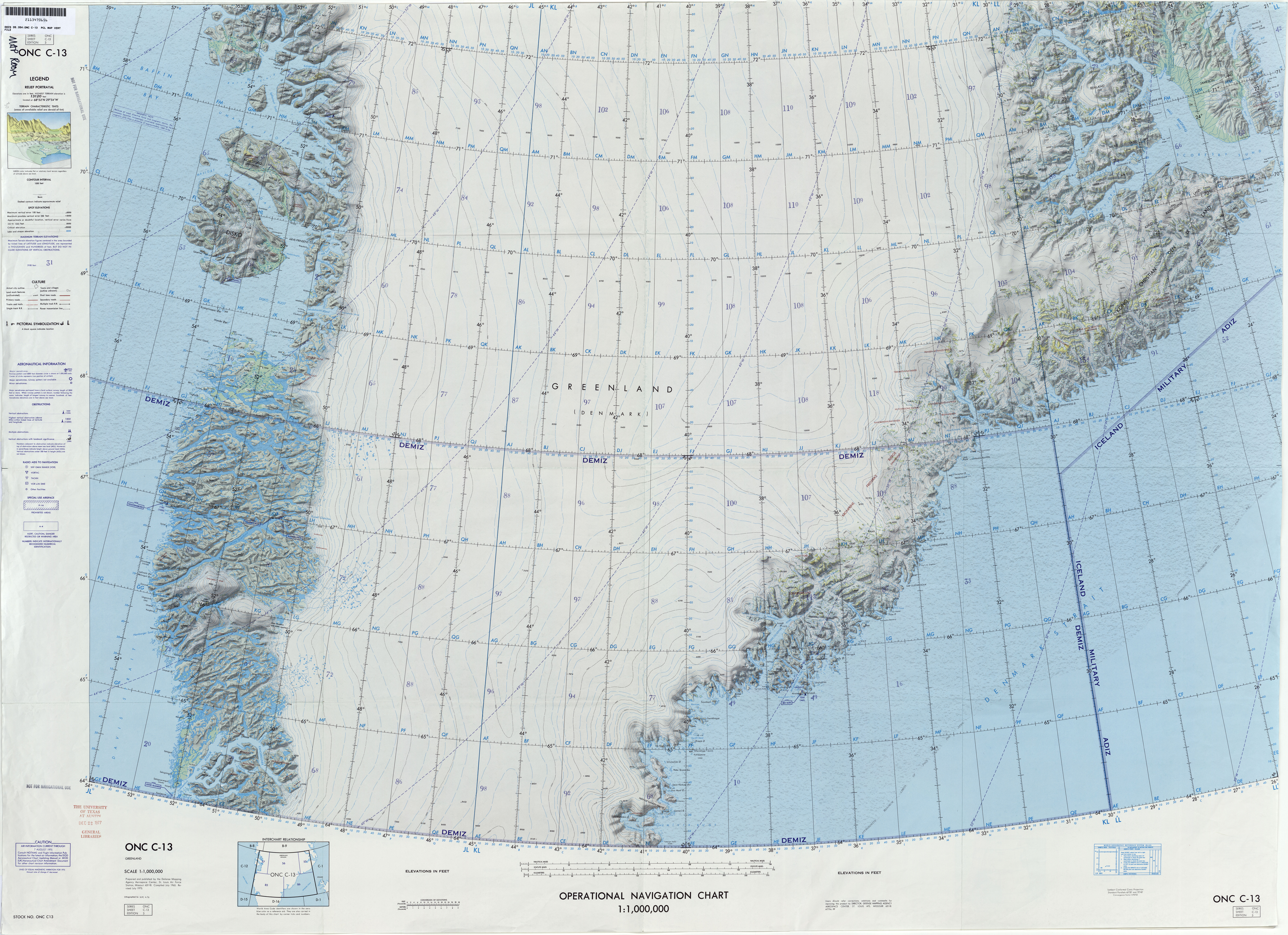
Map of Greenland section.

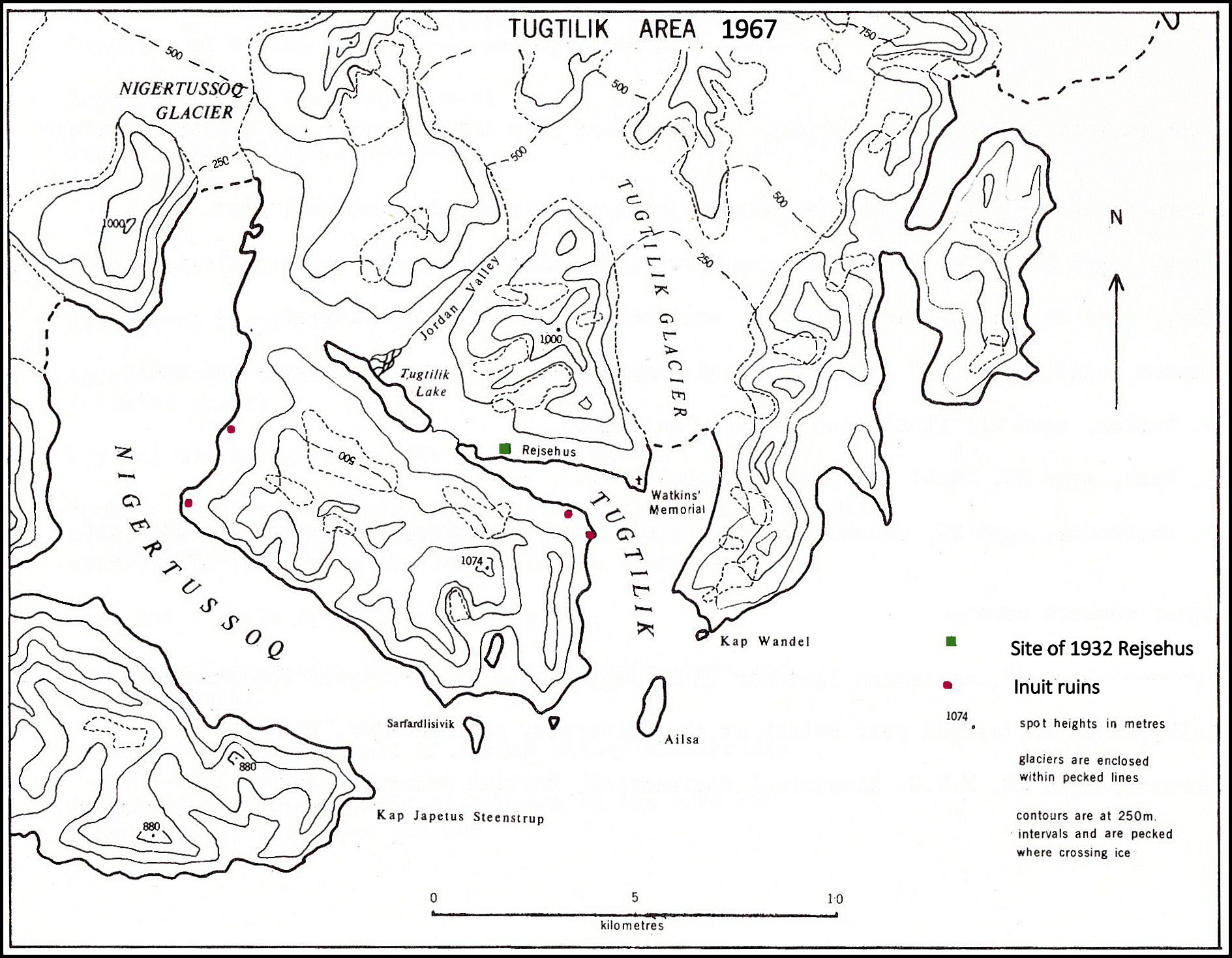
Map of Tuttilik, showing the lake, Inuit ruins, the site of the hut built by Ejnar Mikkelsen in 1932 and the site of Gino Watkins' memorial. (University of Newcastle East Greenland Expedition 1967)

== Gallery ==
Images of Tuttilik
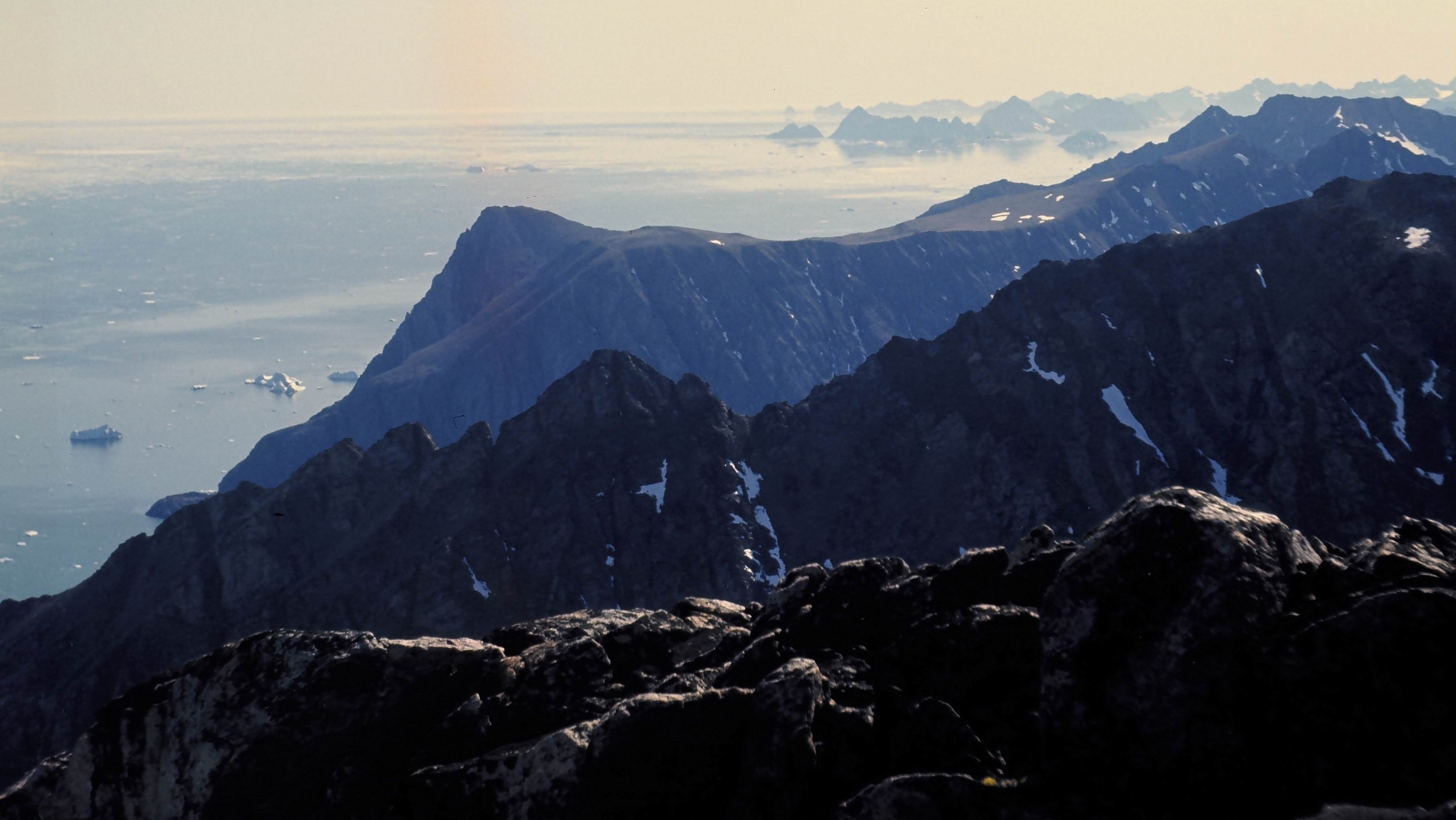
The dramatic Blosseville Coast, looking south from Tuttilik

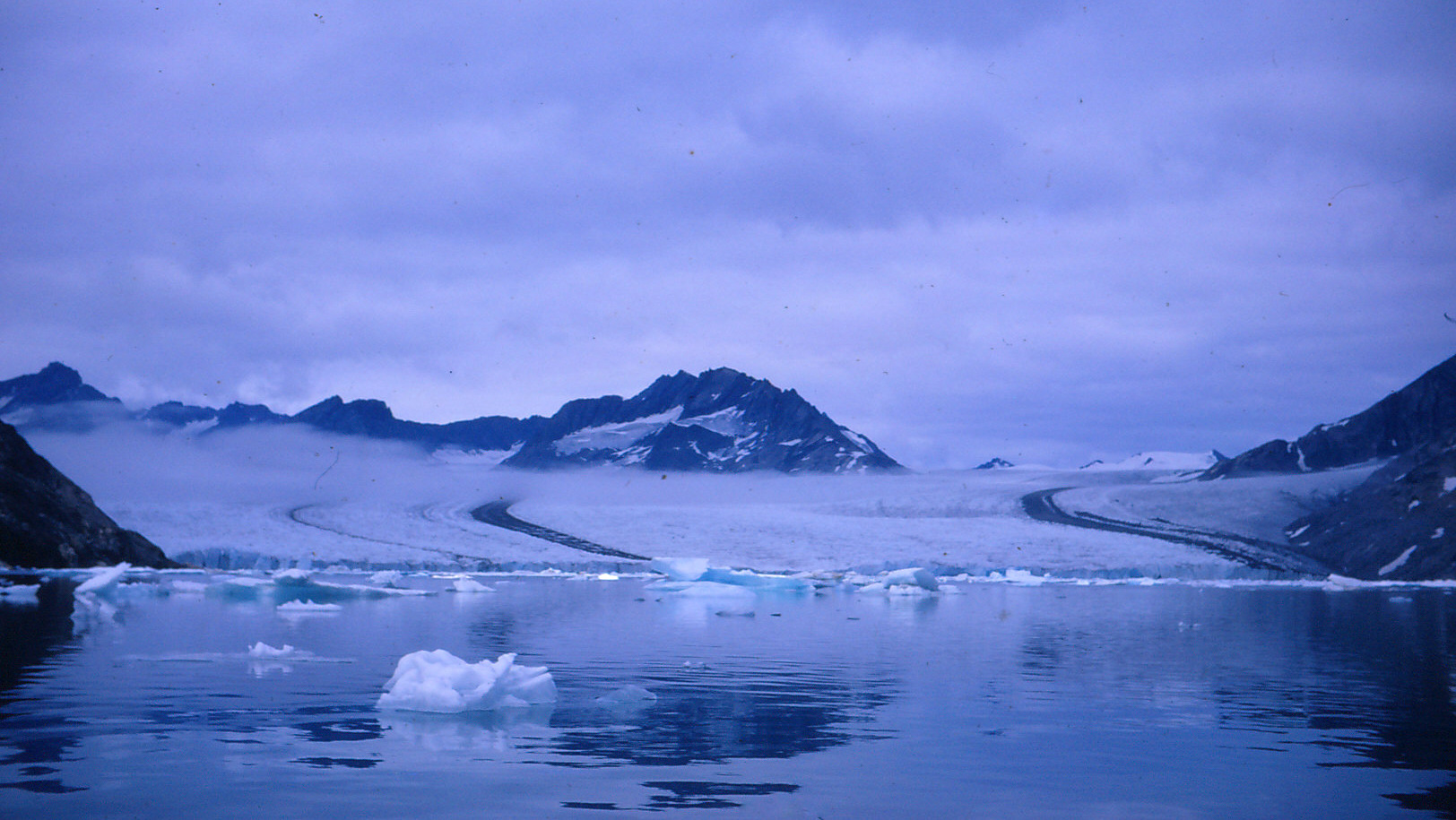
Tugtilik Fjord and glacier in 1967

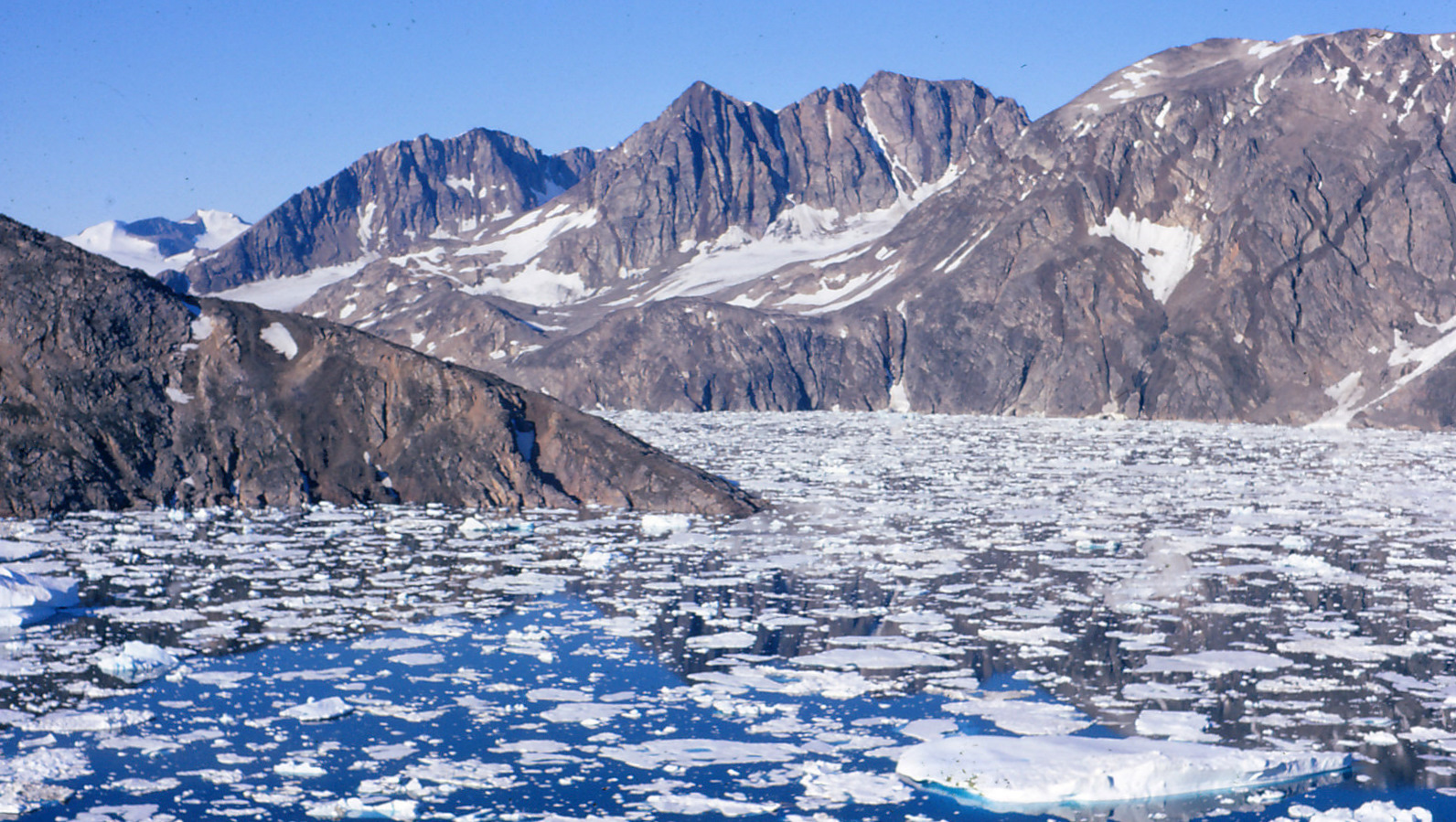
Tuttilik: The steep rock promontory where the fjord divides is where Watkin's memorial is sited.

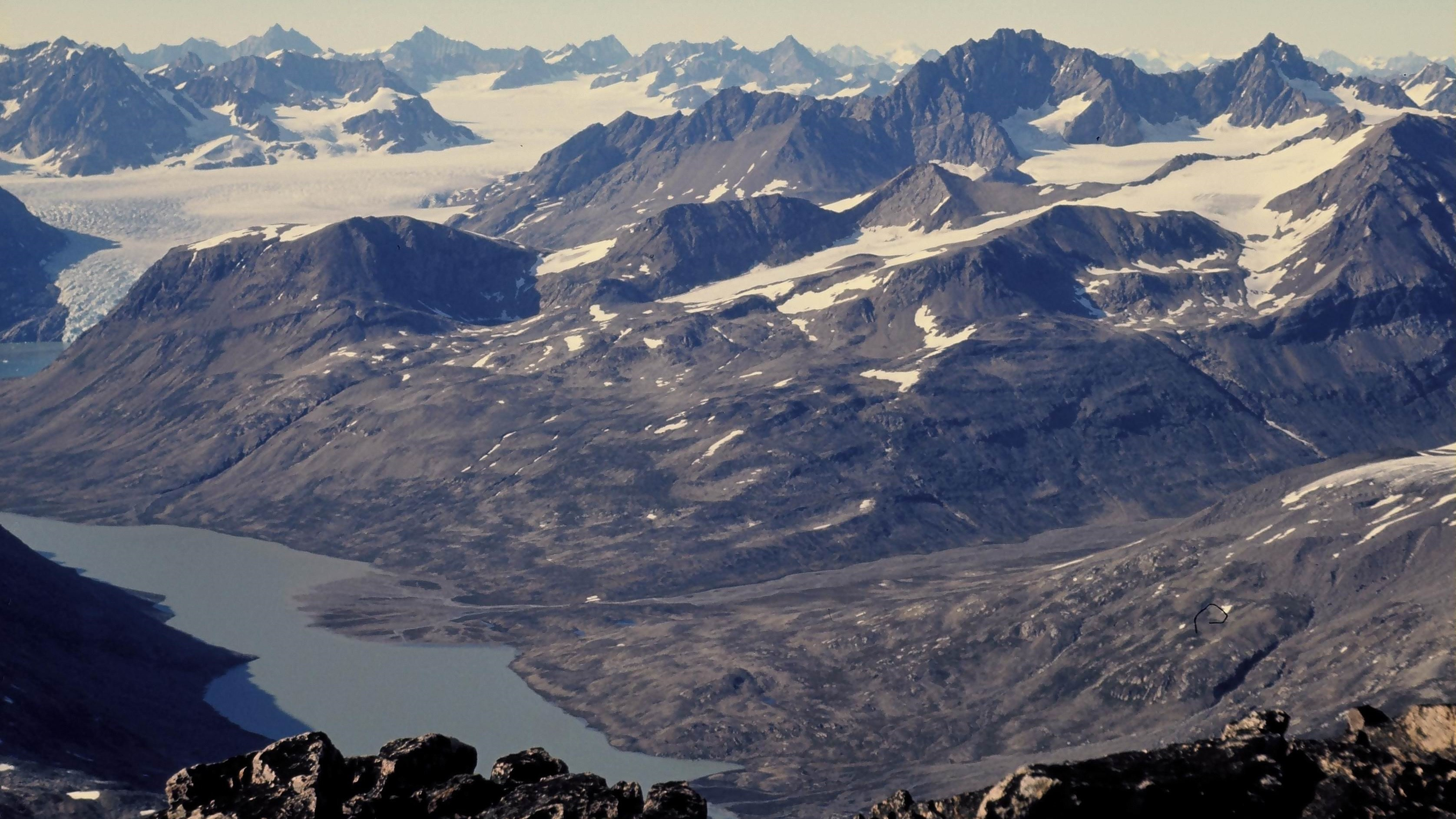
Tuttilik Lake, with Nigertuluk Glacier beyond. Lake Fjord's lake, where trans-Atlantic sea planes could perhaps have landed.

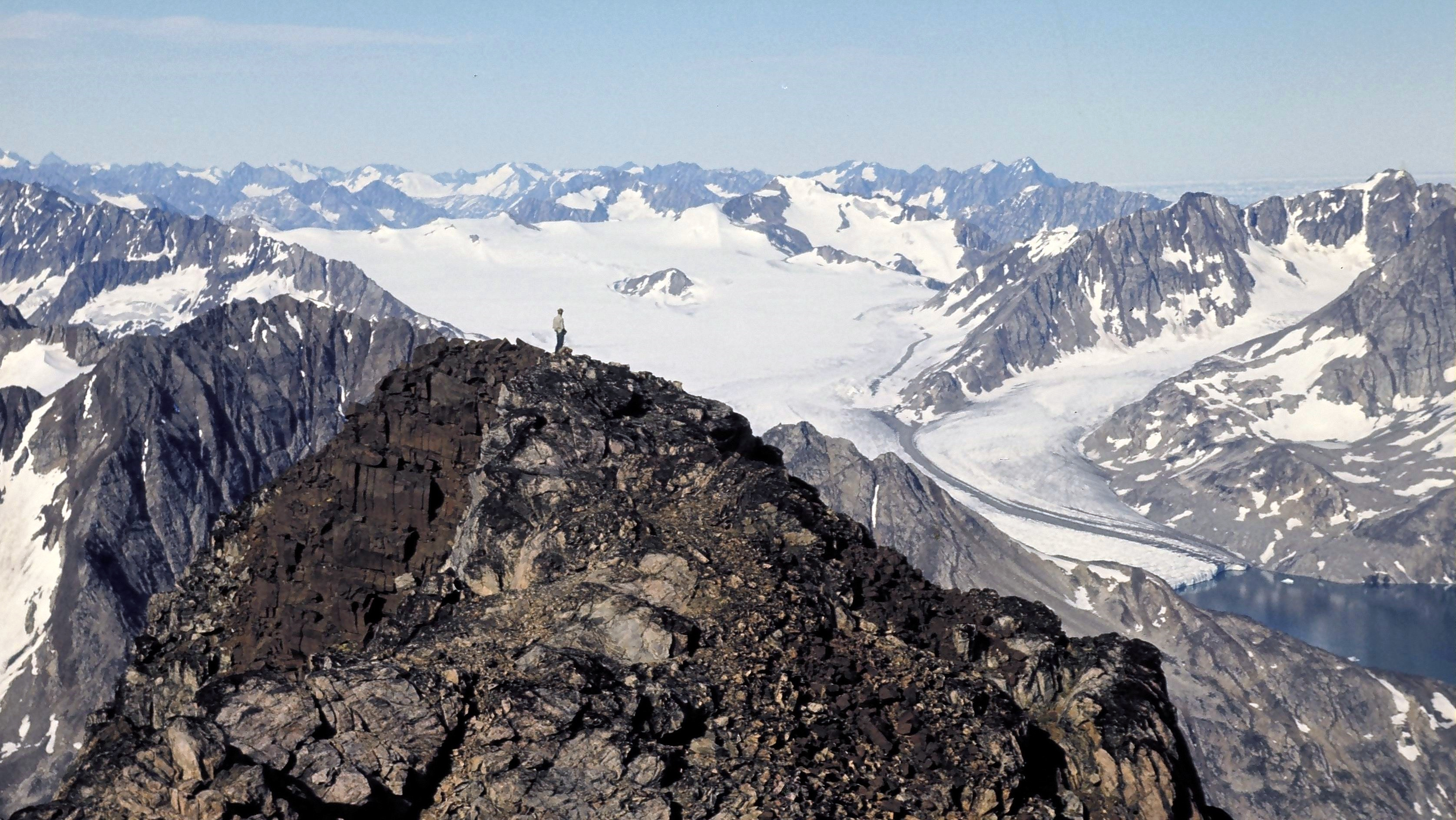
Tugtilik (Tuttilik) glacier and fjord in 1967

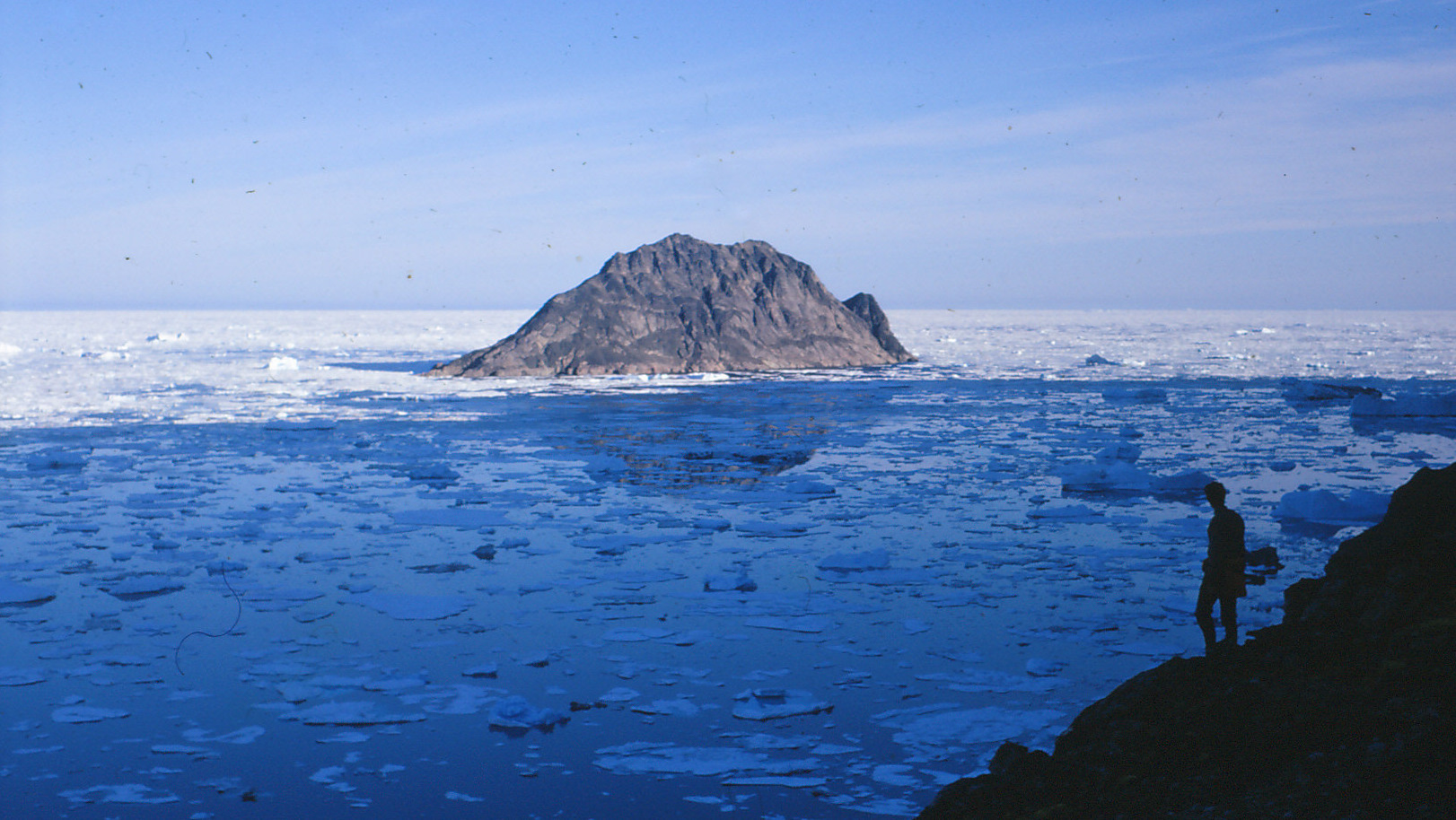
Ailsa Island in the mouth of Tuttilik, named after Ailsa Craig in the Firth of Clyde.

== See also ==
- John Rymill
- List of fjords of Greenland

== Bibliography ==
- Spencer Apollonio, Lands That Hold One Spellbound: A Story of East Greenland, 2008
