= Snebordet =

Mountain in Greenland

- Location within Greenland

Highest point
- Elevation: 3,150 m (10,330 ft)
- Prominence: 760 m (2,490 ft)
- Listing: Mountains of Greenland
- Coordinates: 68°57′33″N 30°50′32″W

Geography
- Location: Sermersooq, Greenland
- Parent range: Lindbergh Range

Snebordet is a mountain located in the Sermersooq region of Greenland. The mountain has an elevation 3,150 metres (10,330 ft) and a prominence of 760 m (2,490 ft). Snebordet is the highest peak of the Lindbergh Range and the 9th tallest mountain in Greenland.
