= Actress (Greenland) =

Highest mountain in the Lemon Range, Sermersooq municipality, eastern Greenland

- Location within Greenland

Highest point
- Elevation: 2,514 m (8,248 ft)
- Coordinates: 68°35′22″N 31°50′23″W

Geography
- Location: Sermersooq, Greenland
- Parent range: Lemon Range

Climbing
- First ascent: 1990s

Actress is the highest mountain in the Lemon Range, Sermersooq municipality, eastern Greenland.

It was climbed in the 1990s by Tom Chamberlain.

== Geography ==
This 2,514 m (8,248 ft) high peak rises at the northern end of the Lemon Range, rising steeply just west of the Frederiksborg Glacier. It is a rocky peak with a vertical icy crevice running along its southern face. This mountain is marked as an 8,726-foot-high (2,660 m) peak in the Defense Mapping Agency Greenland Navigation charts.

Although it is the highest summit of the range, Actress is located inland and is not as conspicuous as the spectacular peak cluster of the Domkirkebjerget with its 2,458 m (8,064 ft) high "Cathedral". The latter is located further south in a more accessible area and "Cathedral" was formerly confused with Actress, the true highest point of the Lemon Range.

== See also ==
- List of mountains in Greenland
