= Sea Wife =

- Original British trade ad
- Directed by: Bob McNaught
- Screenplay by: George K. Burke; Nigel Balchin (uncredited)
- Based on: Sea-Wyf and Biscuit; 1956 novel by James Maurice Scott
- Produced by: André Hakim
- Starring: Joan Collins; Richard Burton; Basil Sydney; Cy Grant
- Cinematography: Edward Scaife
- Edited by: Peter Taylor
- Music by: Kenneth V. Jones; Leonard Salzedo
- Production company: Alma Productions
- Distributed by: 20th Century Fox
- Release dates: 4 April 1957 (London); 16 October 1957 (United States)
- Running time: 82 minutes
- Country: United Kingdom
- Language: English

Sea Wife is a 1957 British CinemaScope drama thriller war film directed by Bob McNaught and starring Joan Collins and Richard Burton. It was written by George K. Burke based on the 1955 James Maurice Scott novel Sea-Wyf and Biscuit. It was photographed in DeLuxe Color. Taken in Jamaica, the film follows a group of survivors from a torpedoed British refugee ship.

== Plot ==
Michael Cannon returns to London after the Second World War and places adverts in the personal columns of newspapers in an effort to re-unite with "Sea Wife", a lost acquaintance. Cannon publishes under the name "Biscuit." In time, he receives a letter summoning him to the Ely Retreat and Mental Home. There he meets an ill man nicknamed "Bulldog", who tries to persuade Biscuit to give up the search. A flashback reveals the backstory.

In 1942, people crowd aboard a ship to escape Singapore before it falls to the Japanese Army. Biscuit encounters "Bulldog", who insists the ship's black purser, later to be nicknamed "Number Four", evict the people from the cabin he has reserved. However, when he sees that it is occupied by hungry children and nuns, he reluctantly changes his mind. The nun with her back to him is Sister Therese, later nicknamed "Sea Wife". Later, the ship is torpedoed by a submarine. Biscuit, Sea Wife, Bulldog, and Number Four commandeer a small life-raft. Only Number Four knows that Sea Wife is a nun; she asks him to keep that secret. It soon becomes evident that Bulldog is a racist who distrusts Number Four.

Later, they encounter a Japanese submarine whose captain reluctantly gives them food and water when Number Four negotiates with him in Japanese. Eventually, the quartet land on a deserted island. Number Four finds a machete, with which he builds a sturdier raft, made of tropical timber. After completion of the project, Number Four insists on keeping the machete for himself, which heightens Bulldog's distrust. Meanwhile, Biscuit falls in love with Sea Wife; she is tempted, but rejects his romantic advances without telling him the reason.

Finally, the four are ready to set sail. Bulldog tricks Number Four into going in search of his missing machete, then casts off without him. When Biscuit tries to stop him, Bulldog knocks him unconscious with an oar. Number Four tries to swim to the raft, but is killed by a shark. Days later, the three survivors are picked up by ship, and Biscuit is taken to a hospital for a long recovery. By the time he is discharged, Sea Wife has gone. Here, the flashback ends, and the narrative returns to "Bulldog's" hospital room in London, where he informs Biscuit that Sea Wife died on the rescue ship. Heartbroken, Biscuit leaves the grounds and walks past two nuns without noticing that Sea Wife is one of them. She watches him leave in silence.

== Cast ==
- Joan Collins as Sea Wife
- Richard Burton as Biscuit
- Basil Sydney as Bulldog
- Cy Grant as Number Four
- Ronald Squire as Clubman
- Harold Goodwin as Daily Telegraph Clerk
- Roddy Hughes as Club Barman
- Gibb McLaughlin as Club Porter
- Lloyd Lamble as Captain 'San Felix'
- Ronald Adam as Army Padre
- Nicholas Hannen as Elderly Passenger
- Beatrice Varley as Elderly Nun

== Production ==
Richard Burton accepted this acting assignment only because, at the time, Roberto Rossellini had been slotted by the Fox studio as the film's director. However, before actual shooting began in Jamaica, Rossellini, whose script would have invited censorship problems, bowed out of the production and was replaced by Bob McNaught.

Sensing early during shooting that the film would wind up a dud, Burton concentrated his energies on two objectives: Joan Collins, who rejected his advances, and drinking, to fight insomnia. Yet despite waking every morning at 5 am with a terrible hangover, he was still able to contribute a full day's work.

During initial exhibition of Sea Wife, The Daily Telegraph distributed miniaturized copies of the personal ads placed by "Biscuit" as a means of promoting itself as well as the film.

The deserted-island scenes for this movie were photographed at the same Ocho Rios, Jamaica, location that had previously been used in such pictures as Saturday Island (1953) and All the Brothers Were Valiant (1953). The city of Kingston stood in for Singapore during early scenes of the film; and before the episode involving the torpedoed ship was shot, Richard Burton participated in a cricket match with some of the actors and extras who were about to be used for that scene.

As noted by The New York Times, the opening credits for Sea Wife state that the film was "adapted from the novel 'Sea-Wyf' by J. M. Scott"—but the person or persons who did the adaptation is/are not identified.
