= 1932–33 East Greenland expedition =

Pan Am-financed Arctic exploration mission

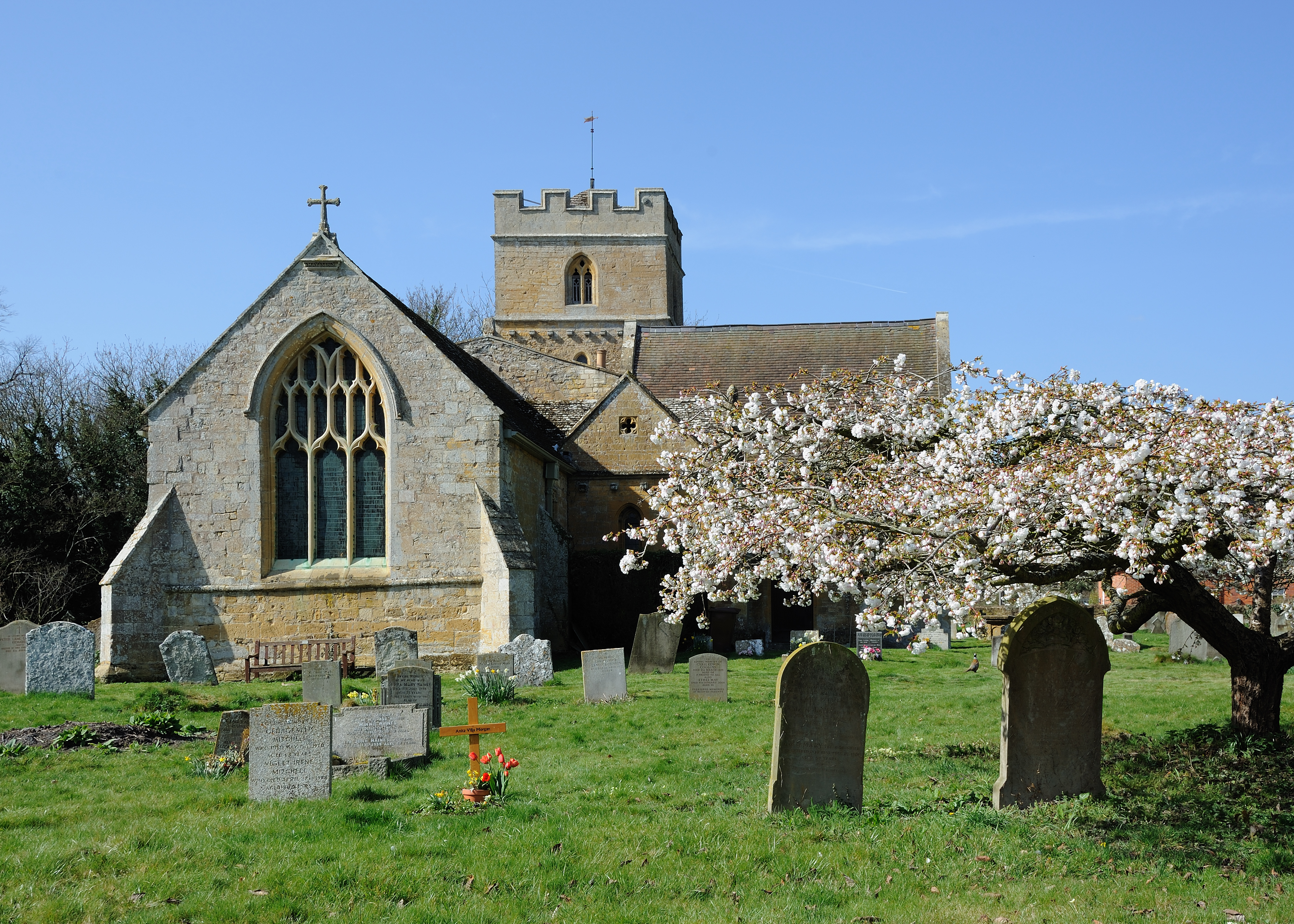
The 1932–33 East Greenland expedition led to the death of Gino Watkins. His remains were never found, but there is a memorial to this ill-fated Arctic explorer in St Peter's Church in Dumbleton, UK

The 1932–33 East Greenland Expedition, subtitled the Pan Am expedition by some sources, was a small expedition to Greenland led by Henry "Gino" Watkins until his death, and then by John Rymill. The expedition was intended to continue the work of the previous British Arctic Air Route Expedition (BAARE) that had mapped unexplored sections of Greenland in 1930–1931.

== Expedition ==
Funding was a major concern to the expedition, dictating its size and scope. It received £500 from Pan-American Airways. The company was hoping to open an air route between Canada and Britain, which would require a refueling facility in the Arctic, and wanted data on meteorology and flying conditions. £200 was contributed by the Royal Geographical Society, which also loaned surveying equipment. The Meteorological Office loaned meteorological instruments. The Times newspaper contributed £100 in return for the press rights.

There were only four members of this expedition: Gino Watkins as leader, John Rymill (surveyor), Freddie Spencer Chapman (ornithologist and photographer) and Quintin Riley (meteorologist). Their aim was to follow up their work of the previous summer's British Arctic Air Route Expedition as well as undertaking meteorological observations for Pan Am.

The expedition began in July 1932. However, on 20 August, Watkins died in an accident while hunting for seals in Tuttilik (Tugtilik Fjord). His empty kayak was found floating upside down by his companions. His body was never found.

Rymill assumed leadership of the expedition and he, Spencer Chapman and Riley decided to continue the expedition but were forced to limit its scope. They wintered in Greenland and surveyed area of about 440 km^{2} (170 sq mi), collecting flora and fauna specimens in the process. Chapman and his companions went through many hardships during the winter, braving rough weather conditions. In the spring, Chapman spent a month among Ammassalik Inuit studying local birds, meanwhile Rymill and Riley surveyed the coast in order to improve on the maps of the area. The expedition concluded at the end of the 1933 summer season. The three members reached Reykjavík on 24 September, catching a steamer to Hull and returning finally to the United Kingdom in the fall of 1933.

== Bibliography ==
- Chapman, F. S. (1934). Watkins’ Last Expedition. London: Chatto and Windus.
- Apollonio, Spencer (2008). Lands That Hold One Spellbound: A Story of East Greenland. University of Calgary Press.
- Rymill, J. R.; Riley, Quintin; Chapman, F. S. (1934). "The Tugtilik (Lake Fjord) Country, East Greenland". The Geographical Journal. 83 (5). Royal Geographical Society: 364–377. doi:10.2307/1785720. JSTOR 1785720.

== See also ==
- Cartographic expeditions to Greenland
