= James Maurice Scott =

British explorer (1906–1986)

- Born: 13 December 1906
- Died: 12 March 1986 (aged 79)
- Education: Cambridge University
- Occupations: British explorer and writer

James Maurice Scott (13 December 1906 – 12 March 1986) was a British explorer and writer. He was born in Egypt where his father was an English judge in the mixed courts. After he graduated from Cambridge University in 1928 he joined an exploring expedition to Labrador. He served in the 5th Scots Guard Ski Battalion.He is best known for his biography of Gino Watkins, and for the novel Sea-Wyf and Biscuit (1955) which was filmed as Sea Wife in 1957 starring Richard Burton and Joan Collins.

== Life ==
He was born on 13 December 1906 in Egypt where his father was a Judge of the Mixed Court, and was educated at Fettes College and Clare College, Cambridge, where he gained a Blue for Rugby football. He accompanied Gino Watkins on two expeditions, and wrote a biography after Watkins's death in 1932. He was a member of the 1933 British Mount Everest expedition but was not one of the sixteen chosen for the main attempt. In 1939 he joined the 5th Scots Guards Ski Battalion and was later an instructor at the special forces training school at Inverailort Castle in the Scottish Highlands. He ended the war as Commander of the Mountain Warfare School in the Apennines and was awarded the OBE in 1945. After the war, he joined the British Council and worked in Milan and Belgrade until 1948. He was on the staff of the Daily Telegraph from 1948 to 1953. He was married twice, in 1933 to Pamela Watkins, marriage dissolved in 1958, and then to Adriana Rinaldi. He died on 12 March 1986 in Huntingdon.

== Sea-Wyf and Biscuit ==
Between 7 March and 21 May 1951 a series of enigmatic small ads appeared in the Daily Telegraph personal columns, in which 'Biscuit' appeared to be seeking a reunion with 'Sea-Wyf' but was being discouraged by 'Bulldog'. There was a good deal of public speculation, and the Daily Mirror reprinted the whole set of announcements on 26 May.
Four years later Scott published Sea-Wyf and Biscuit, which purported to be the full story behind the advertisements, describing the fourteen-week ordeal of four survivors of a torpedoed freighter in the Indian Ocean. It is hard to be sure whether this is, as Scott maintained, a true story which he learned at first hand fictionalised just enough for the main actors to be unidentifiable, or a plausible made-up story to explain the documented small ads, or whether Scott had created the whole story, inserting the ads himself in order to supply a hook for the novel. This last possibility is supported by the fact that Scott was employed at the time in a P.R. capacity at the Daily Telegraph, charged with using his creative skills to boost the paper's circulation.

== Other books ==
Scott's substantial output was evenly divided between fiction and non-fiction, with the fiction shared between books for adults including I Keep My Word, A Choice of Heaven and for children such as Cap Across the River and A Journey of Many Sleeps. The non-fiction includes biographies of Gino Watkins, Henry Hudson, Boadicea and George Sand, together with travel books such as A Walk Along the Apennines, and history such as The Tea Story and The White Poppy. Altogether his output amounted to over forty titles.

== Works ==
The Land that God Gave Cain: an account of H. G. Watkins's expedition to Labrador, 1928–29. Chatto and Windus. 1933. Reissued by Penguin, 1938.

Gino Watkins. Hodder and Stoughton. 1935. Maps drawn by C. E. Denny.

Snowstone. Hodder and Stoughton. 1936.

The Silver Land. Hodder and Stoughton. 1937.

The Land of Seals. Hodder and Stoughton. 1938.

Unknown River. Hodder and Stoughton. 1939.

The Other Side of the Moon. Hodder and Stoughton. 1946.

The Pole of Inaccessibility. Hodder and Stoughton. 1947

The Will and the Way. Hodder and Stoughton. 1949.

Cap Across the River. Hodder and Stoughton. 1949.

The Black Joke. Hodder and Stoughton. 1950.

The Bright Eyes of Danger. Hodder and Stoughton. 1950. Maps drawn by Bip Pares.

Hudson of Hudson’s Bay. Methuen. 1950. Illustrations by Astrid Walford.

Vineyards of France. Hodder and Stoughton. 1950. Paintings and drawings by Keith Baynes.

The Touch of the Nettle. Hodder and Stoughton. 1951.

Portrait of an Ice Cap. Chatto and Windus. 1953.

The Man Who Made Wine. Hodder and Stoughton. 1953.

Captain Smith and Pocohontas. Methuen. 1953.

Heather Mary. Hodder and Stoughton. 1953.

Sea-Wyf and Biscuit. Heinemann. 1955. Filmed as Sea Wife, 1957. Reissued by Pan Books with stills from the film, 1957.

The Other Half of the Orange. Heinemann. 1955.

White Magic. Methuen. 1955.

I Keep My Word. Heinemann. 1957. US edition, The Lady and the Corsair. Dutton. 1958.

A choice of heaven. Heinemann. 1959.

Where the River Bends. Heinemann. 1962

The Tea Story. Heinemann. 1964.

The Book of Pall Mall. Heinemann. 1965.

Dingo. Heineman. 1966.

The Devil You Don't. Chilton. 1967.

In a Beautiful Pea Green Boat. Chilton. 1969.

From sea to ocean. Geoffrey Bles. 1969

The White Poppy: a History of Opium. Heinemann. 1969.

George Sand. Heron. 1969.

Boadicea. Heron. 1969.

Fridtjof Nansen. Heron. 1971.

Extel 100: the Centenary History of the Exchange Telegraph Company. Ernest Benn. 1972.

A Walk Along the Apennines. Geoffrey Bles. 1973.

A Journey of Many Sleeps. Chatto and Windus, 1975. Reissued as Desperate Journey, Hamlyn, 1977.

Icebound: Journeys to the Northwest Sea. Gordon & Cremonesi. 1977.

Red Hair and Moonwater: short stories. Robert Hale Ltd. 1980.

Private life of polar exploration. Blackwood. 1982
