= Colin Bertram =

British zoologist

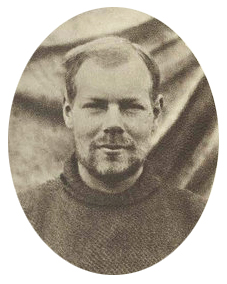

Dr George Colin Lawder Bertram, generally known as Colin Bertram, (27 November 1911 – 2001) was a British zoologist.

He was born the son of Frank Bertram (later the deputy director of Civil Aviation) and was educated at Berkhamsted and at St John's College, Cambridge, where he was awarded a first in Zoology.

After graduation, he joined a three-man Cambridge Expedition to Scoresby Sound, East Greenland, transported there and back by Dr Jean-Baptiste Charcot in his ship Pourquoi-Pas?. This was followed by nine months studying coral reefs in the Red Sea, prior to accepting a place as a biologist on the British Graham Land Expedition of 1934–37.

On that expedition he initially carried out the task of marine biologist on the expedition ship Penola but then exchanged roles with the shore biologist. As a result, he was able to take part in the long exploratory expedition of 600 miles by dog sledge which discovered the ice-filled George VI Sound, separating Alexander Island from the Antarctic Peninsula. They also confirmed that the peninsula was not an archipelago.

In 1939, he married fellow zoologist, Kate Ricardo, a specialist of East African and Palestinian fisheries (and daughter of consulting engineer Sir Harry Ricardo, FRS). Together, they carried out extensive fieldwork in Australia, Papua New Guinea, Sri Lanka, Belize and the Guianas, and published almost two dozen articles and books on sirenians between 1962 and 1977. They had four sons.

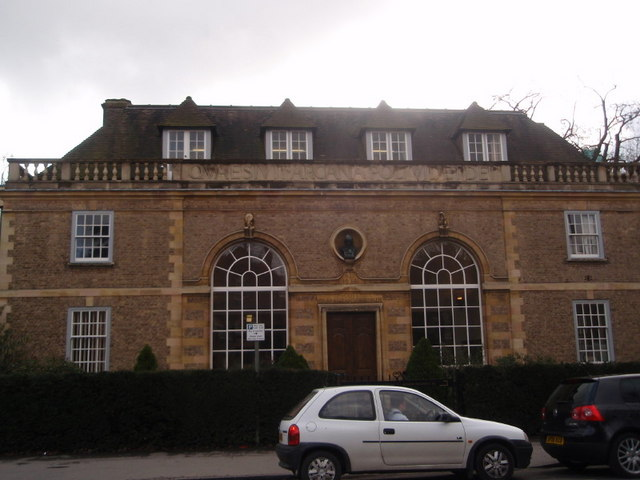
Scott Polar Research Institute

During the Second World War Bertram was initially based at the Scott Polar Research Institute in Cambridge, where he worked on the development and testing of Arctic clothing and equipment for the War Office. He was involved in the invention of the string vest, which allows a thin layer of warm air to circulate next to the skin and reduces the loss of body heat. In 1940 he was posted to Palestine for three years as Chief Fisheries Officer, helping to maximise the food resources in the Gulf of Aqaba.

After the war he took up a fellowship at St John's College, Cambridge and from 1949 concurrently held the part-time post of Director of the Scott Polar Research Institute.

He was a strong advocate for the need to stabilise world population and was a long-term member (and for seven years general secretary) of the Galton Institute. After the passage of the British Nationality Act 1948, Bertram authored several articles which argued that races were biologically distinct due to their evolved adaptations to different environments, and that miscegenation should only be permitted between similar races.

He died in 2001, aged 89.

== Honours and awards ==
- 1942 W. S. Bruce Medal "for valuable biological work in the Arctic and Antarctic from 1932 to 1937"
- 1957 Murchison Grant for his work at the Scott Polar Research Institute.
- The Bertram Glacier, which flows from the Dyer Plateau of Palmer Land into George VI Sound in Antarctica, was named after him.

== Works ==
- Arctic Antarctic: The Technique of Polar Travel (1939)
- Adam's Brood: Hopes and Fears of a Biologist (1959)
- In Search of Mermaids: The Manatees of Guyana (1963).
- His autobiography, A Biologist's Story, was privately printed in 1987.
