= Augustine Courtauld =

British Arctic explorer

- Born: 26 August 1904; Bocking, Braintree, Essex, United Kingdom of Great Britain and Ireland
- Died: 3 March 1959 (aged 54); United Kingdom of Great Britain and Northern Ireland
- Other names: August Courtauld
- Spouse(s): Mollie Courtauld, later Lady Butler of Saffron Walden (née Montgomerie)
- Children: 6
- Parent: Samuel Augustine Courtauld JP
- Family: Courtauld Family

Augustine Courtauld (26 August 1904 – 3 March 1959), often called August Courtauld, was a British yachtsman and Arctic explorer, best known for serving as the solo meteorologist of a winter observation post, Icecap Station, located in the interior of Greenland in 1930–1931.

== Biography ==
=== Early life ===
Courtauld was born at Bocking, Essex, the son of Samuel Augustine Courtauld JP (1865–1953) and great-grandson of George Courtauld (1802–1861). He was a cousin of British industrialist Samuel Courtauld the founder of the Courtauld Institute, and of Sydney Courtauld, who married the leading politician Rab Butler.

He was educated at Charterhouse School and Trinity College, Cambridge, graduating in 1926.

In 1926 he joined James Wordie's summer expedition to east Greenland as photographer. In 1927 Courtauld travelled with Francis and Peter Rodd to the Aïr Mountains in the southern Sahara. Courtauld attempted unsuccessfully to become a stockbroker but returned to Greenland in the summer of 1929 on another expedition with Wordie.

=== British Arctic Air Route Expedition ===
During the pioneer powered flights over the Atlantic Ocean in the 1920s, it was already clear that an all-ocean route was suboptimal, especially when flying from east to west. The Great Circle routes from much of Europe to much of North America approach or pass over the island of Greenland, and strong jet stream winds are a further incentive to the westbound flyer to take a northern route. During the 1920s, however, little was known of climatic conditions on the coastline of Greenland, and almost literally nothing was known of the weather in the interior of Greenland during the polar winter. The Gino Watkins-led expedition of 1930–1931, the British Arctic Air Route Expedition, was intended to gather data aimed at solving these puzzles.

Courtauld joined the Watkins/BAARE expedition and volunteered to conduct meteorological observations at Icecap Station, a purpose-built post atop the Greenland ice cap, 8,600 feet (2,600 m) above sea level and 112 miles (180 km) west of the expedition's main base. Courtauld volunteered and served as a solo observer at this post for a five-month tour of duty during the height of the 1930–1931 winter. Watkins and other expedition members relieved him on 5 May 1931, just as Courtauld's fuel was running out, partly because two of his tins of paraffin had leaked. Later in the expedition, together with Percy Lemon and Gino Watkins, Courtauld made an open boat journey of 600 nautical miles (1,111 km) around the King Frederick VI Coast in the south of Greenland.

Upon his return to England, Courtauld was awarded the Polar Medal, in silver, with clasp inscribed "Arctic, 1930-1931".

=== Climbing Gunnbjorn Fjeld ===
Courtauld was a member of the party to make the first ascent of Gunnbjørn Fjeld (3963m), the highest mountain in the Arctic, in 1935.

=== War service ===
Courtauld served throughout the Second World War as an officer in the Royal Naval Volunteer Reserve. He was seconded to No. 14 (Arctic) Commando which included polar explorers among them, David Haig-Thomas, Andrew Croft, and some men from the RNVR. They specialised in using canoes for limpet mine attacks in Arctic waters.

=== Personal life ===
Courtauld married Mollie Montgomerie in Southwark Cathedral in 1932. The couple raised six children at their seat, Spencers, in Great Yeldham, Essex.

In later life Courtauld turned to what had become his first love, yachting: Mollie was to later recall that "life with August was to consist largely of life at sea."

In 1953, Augustine Courtauld served as High Sheriff of Essex for the year, an appointment also once held by his grandfather and his uncle William Courtauld, the later baronet. In this same year, however, he became ill with multiple sclerosis, and as a result of complications from this illness, he died in March 1959.

In 1956 he set up the Augustine Courtauld Trust to help causes which "wouldn't get much help otherwise".

On 21 October 1959, his widow married the Conservative Home Secretary Rab Butler, whose wife, August's cousin, Sydney Courtauld had died in 1954. Butler went on to become foreign secretary and was spoken of as 'the next Prime Minister'. The couple lived in a number of homes, including Gatcombe Park which Butler had inherited from his father-in-law, the art collector Samuel Courtauld; Gatcombe was bought by Queen Elizabeth II in 1976 for Princess Anne, and Captain Mark Phillips. The Butlers bought back Spencers, the house where Mollie had lived during her first marriage, for their home. The couple were married for more than two decades, until Richard, Lord Butler of Saffron Walden, died in 1982. Lady Butler, the former Mrs Mollie Courtauld, died on 18 February 2009 at the age of 101.

== Memory ==
Mount Augustine in the Watkins Mountains, Greenland

On 28 May 2011 a joint British-Russian team of alpinists climbed a previously unconquered peak (~3150m), de facto the last remaining unclimbed summit in the vicinity of Gunnbjørn Fjeld in the Watkins Range in Greenland. By mutual consent the party decided to name the peak Mount Augustine Courtauld, often called simply Mount Augustine for brevity, in memory of him.

The Courtauld Glacier by the Lemon Range in East Greenland and Mount Courtauld in Palmer Land, Antarctica, were named after him as well.

Courtauld was the subject of a 2017 episode of the Futility Closet Podcast, chronicling his time at the Greenland weather station.
