= Penola Island =

Small island in the south Shetland Islands

- Location within Antarctica

Geography
- Location: Antarctica
- Coordinates: 62°3′S 57°51′W

Administration
- Administered under the Antarctic Treaty System

Demographics
- Population: Uninhabited

Penola Island is a small island in Sherratt Bay lying close off the south coast of King George Island, in the South Shetland Islands. Charted in 1937 by DI personnel on the Discovery II, and named for the Penola, the British Graham Land Expedition (BGLE) ship which assisted the Discovery II in the search for a survey party stranded on King George Island in January 1937.

== See also ==
- List of antarctic and sub-antarctic islands
