= Penola (fly) =

Scientific classification
- Kingdom: Animalia
- Phylum: Arthropoda
- Class: Insecta
- Order: Diptera
- Family: Sphaeroceridae
- Subfamily: Copromyzinae
- Genus: Penola; Richards, 1941

Type species
- Penola eudyptidis Richards, 1941

Genus of flies

Penola is a genus of flies belonging to the family Sphaeroceridae. They are closely related to the genus Frutillaria from mainland South America

== Species ==
- Penola eudyptidis (Richards, 1941) Falkland Islands
