= British Arctic Air Route Expedition =

1930-31 privately funded East Greenland exploration mission

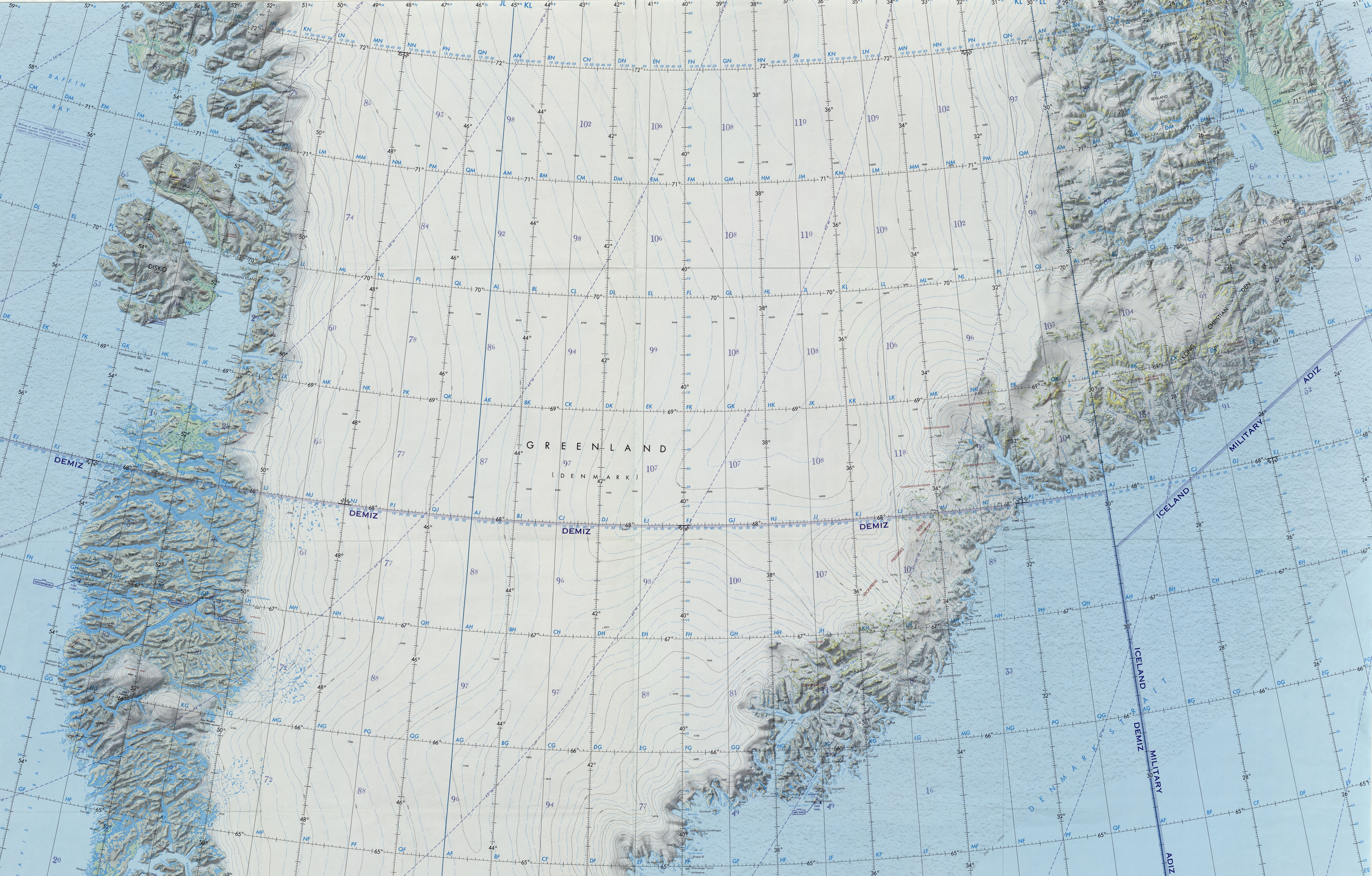
Surveyed area on Greenland's eastern coast

The British Arctic Air Route Expedition (BAARE) was a privately funded expedition to the east coast and interior of the island of Greenland from 1930 to 1931. Led by Gino Watkins, it aimed to improve maps and charts of poorly surveyed sections of Greenland's coastline, and to gather climate data from the coast and interior during the north polar winter. This venture was followed by the smaller 1932–1933 East Greenland expedition, led by Watkins until his death.

== Expedition ==
The expedition travelled to Greenland aboard Quest, a historic sealing vessel previously used by Ernest Shackleton in 1921–1922. Expedition members included Frederick Chapman, John Rymill, Quintin Riley (meteorologist), Augustine Courtauld, J. M. Scott, Captain Percy Lemon (wireless operator and signal officer), L. R. Wager (geologist), Alfred Stephenson (chief surveyor), Lt. Martin Lindsay, Flight Lt. N. H. D'Aeth (pilot), W. E. Hampton (second pilot & aircraft engineer), Surg. Lt. E. W. Bingham (doctor) and H. I. Cozens (photographer and assistant pilot).

=== Base hut ===
Upon their arrival in Greenland, the expedition set up their land-based headquarters: the base hut, a winter camp located on a fjord coastline 30 miles (48 km) west of Tasiilaq, then known as Angmagssalik. Here most of the members of the expedition's shore party overwintered, made contact with local Inuit, and sent out light expeditions to chart and survey adjoining areas of coastline.

=== Icecap Station ===
Meteorological data was gathered at both the base camp and a satellite base, Icecap Station, a purpose-built post atop the Greenland ice cap, 8,600 feet (2,600 m) above sea level and 112 miles (180 km) west of the expedition's base camp. An expedition member, Augustine Courtauld, volunteered to serve as a solo observer for a five-month tour of duty here during the height of the 1930–1931 winter. Watkins and other expedition members relieved him on 5 May 1931, just as Courtauld's food and fuel were running out. Courtauld's observations included some of the first extended data sets ever gathered from the Greenland icecap interior during a polar winter.

=== Conclusion and honours ===
The members of the expedition, including Watkins and Courtauld, returned to Denmark and then to England, receiving significant acclaim in both nations. Key members of the expedition were awarded the Polar Medal by King George V, the first given for Arctic service in 60 years.

== Literature ==
- Lindsay, Martin: Snowed in with Greenland Eskimos, in: China Journal, Vol. 16 (1932), p.p. 19–24.
- Lindsay, Martin: Those Greenland Days, Blackwood, 256 pages (1932)
- Roberts, David: Into the Great Emptiness, Norton, 368 pages (2022)

== See also ==
- Cartographic expeditions to Greenland
- Schweizerland
- Watkins Range
