= John Rymill =

Australian explorer (1905–1968)

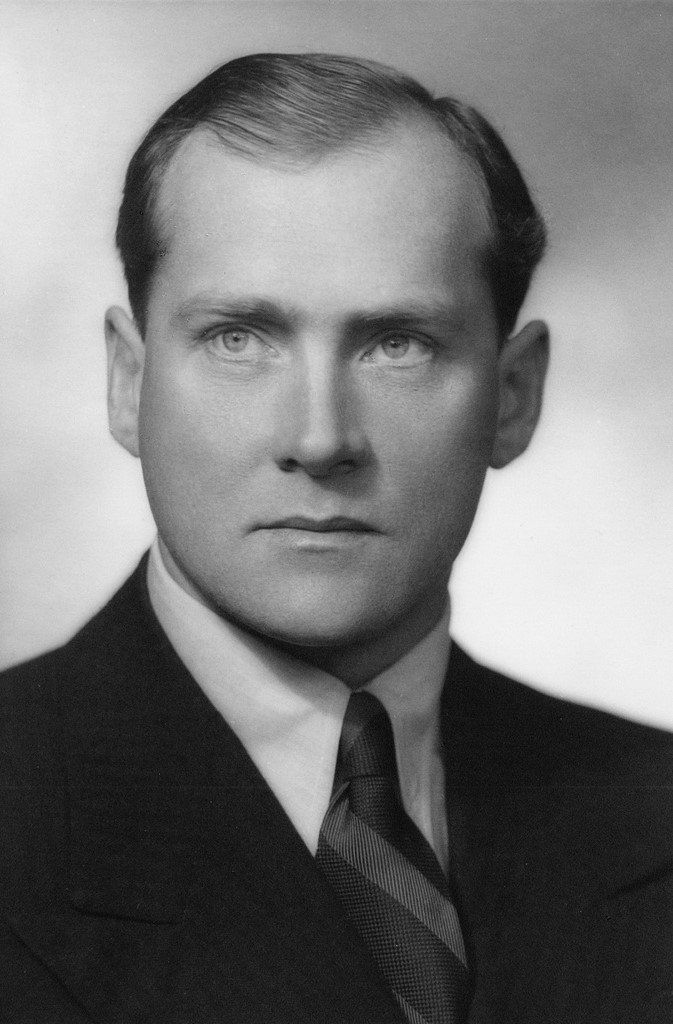
Rymill in 1939

John Riddoch Rymill (13 March 1905 – 7 September 1968) was an Australian polar explorer, who had the rare second clasp added to his Polar Medal.

== Early life ==
Rymill was born at Penola, South Australia, the second son of Robert Rymill (7 July 1869 – 14 May 1906) and Mary Edith Rymill (née Riddoch), owners of Penola Station, and grandson of Frank Rymill. He was educated at Melbourne Grammar School, where he first developed his love of polar literature, and at the Royal Geographical Society in London, where he studied surveying and navigation.

== Polar career ==
Rymill prepared himself for polar exploration with alpine experience in Europe, flying lessons at the de Havilland Aircraft Co. Ltd, Hendon and courses at the Scott Polar Research Institute, Cambridge, under Professor Frank Debenham. In 1931 he was appointed to the British Arctic Air Route Expedition to Greenland (1930–31) as surveyor and pilot. He also joined the subsequent 1932-33 East Greenland Expedition led by Gino Watkins and which he led after Watkins' death in Tuttilik Fjord.

As a result of these Arctic experiences, Rymill determined to mount an Antarctic expedition to South Graham Land and the Weddell Sea south of Cape Horn, South America. After some difficulties securing sponsorship, he purchased an old sail training ship which he renamed Penola and with volunteer staff from Cambridge University and nine crew supplied by the Royal Navy, sailed to the South Atlantic, where their first base was South Georgia. His British Graham Land Expedition (1934–37) discovered a southern, permanently frozen channel, later named George VI Sound, extending to the Bellingshausen Sea.

== Honours ==
Rymill Coast in Palmer Land and Rymill Bay in Graham Land, Antarctica, were named after him.

- The British Service Polar Medal with Arctic bar (1930–31)
- Antarctic (1934–1937) bars
- Murchison Award (1934) of the Royal Geographical Society
- Founder's Medal (1938) of the Royal Geographical Society
- David Livingstone Centenary Medal of the American Geographical Society of New York (1939).
  'The survey work of this expedition constitutes probably the largest contribution of accurately detailed surveys of the Antarctic Continent made by an expedition'. Citation of David Livingstone Centenary Gold Medal

== Family ==
In 1938, after completing the official account of the expedition Southern Lights, Rymill married Dr. Eleanor Mary Francis (17 June 1911 – 14 April 2003), a geographer whom he had met at Cambridge. They returned to Australia to live at and manage the Old Penola Estate, and Rymill served as a district councillor. During World War II he was commissioned in the Royal Australian Naval Volunteer Reserve. He died on 7 September 1968, like his father, as the result of a car accident, survived by his wife and their two sons and was buried at New Penola cemetery.

== Bibliography ==
- Bertram, G.G.L. Antarctica sixty years ago: a reappraisal of the British Graham Land Expedition, 1934-37 Polar Record, 1996, 32
- Chapman, F. S., Northern Lights (Lond., 1932)
- Chapman, F. S. Watkin's Last Expedition (Lond., 1934)
- Roberts, B.B. The British Graham Land Expedition, 1934–37: scientific papers, London, British Museum (Natural History), 1940–41, Vol. 1
- Rymill, J.R. et al. Papers, diaries of expedition members (Scott Polar Research Institute, Cambridge 1937)
- Rymill, J.R. Southern Lights Malvern, The Knell Press, 1986 [reprint of 1939 edition]
