= Gino Watkins =

British Arctic explorer (1907–1932)

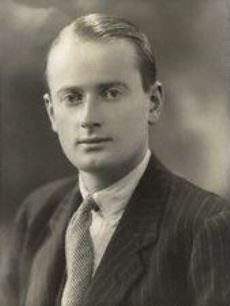
Gino Watkins

Henry George "Gino" Watkins FRGS (29 January 1907 – c. 20 August 1932) was a British Arctic explorer and nephew of Bolton Eyres-Monsell, 1st Viscount Monsell.

== Biography ==
Born in London, he was the eldest child of Henry George Watkins (1881–1935) and his wife Jennie Helen Monsell (1879–1928), who were married in London in Q1 1906. As a child, he spent some time with his father's mother Marie in Poole, Dorset; and as a baby, he was sometimes pushed in his pram by Olave Soames, the teenaged daughter of a neighbour. Watkins was educated at Lancing College and acquired a love of mountaineering and the outdoors from his father through holidays in the Alps, the Tyrol and the English Lake District. He became interested in polar exploration while studying at Trinity College, Cambridge, under the tutelage of James Wordie, and organised his first expedition, to Edgeøya, in the summer of 1927. Watkins also learnt to fly, as one of the first members of the Cambridge University Air Squadron.

In 1928–9, Watkins made an expedition to Labrador, where he established a base at North West River and explored much previously unmapped territory, including Snegamook Lake. However, his most important expedition was the British Arctic Air Route Expedition of 1930–31. Watkins led a team of fourteen men to survey the east coast of Greenland and monitor weather conditions there, the information being needed for a planned air route from England to Winnipeg. In addition to meeting these aims, the expedition discovered the Skaergaard intrusion, and Watkins and two companions, Percy Lemon and Augustine Courtauld, made an open boat journey of 600 nautical miles (1,111 km) around the King Frederick VI Coast in the south of Greenland.

The expedition won Watkins the 1932 Founder's Medal from the Royal Geographical Society, and brought him international fame. In addition, one of the members of Watkins' expedition, Augustine Courtauld, solo-manned a meteorological observation post in the interior of the Greenland ice pack during the 1930–31 winter, generating the first data set from this previously inaccessible location. The expedition also included as ski expert and naturalist Freddie Spencer Chapman, who would later gain fame as a soldier in Japanese-occupied Malaya.

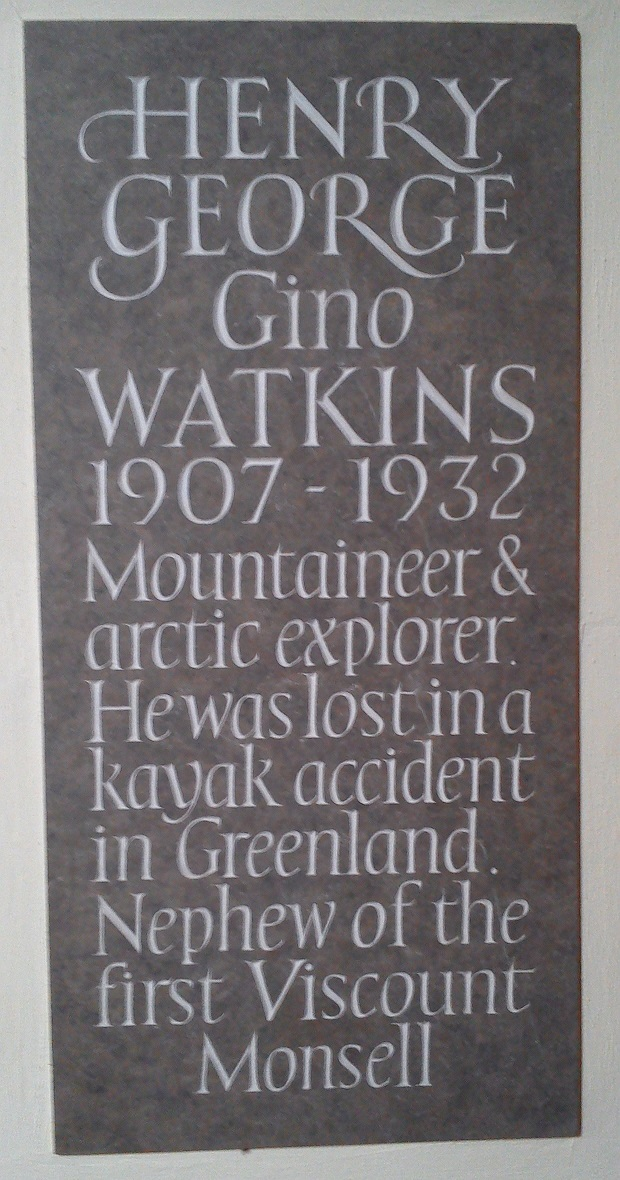
Memorial to Gino Watkins at St Peter's Church, Dumbleton in Gloucestershire

Watkins next attempted to organise an expedition to cross Antarctica, but in the depths of the Great Depression, finance proved impossible to raise. Instead, he returned to Greenland in 1932 with a small team on the East Greenland Expedition to continue the work of his air route expedition. On 20 August, he went hunting for seals in his kayak in Tuttilik (Tugtilik Fjord) and did not return. Later that day, his empty kayak was found floating upside down by his companions. His body was never found. There is a memorial to him in St Peter's Church in Dumbleton, Gloucestershire.

== Honours ==
In 1932 he was awarded the Hans Egede Medal by the Royal Danish Geographical Society.

Watkins is commemorated by the Gino Watkins Memorial Fund, managed by the Royal Geographical Society and the Scott Polar Research Institute at the University of Cambridge, which provides grants for polar exploration. Watkins Island, a sub-Antarctic island in the Southern Ocean, commemorates Watkins.

The Watkins Range, Greenland's highest mountain range, bears his name.

The Gino Watkins Glacier, in New Zealand's Whataroa watershed, and the close peaks of Gino and Watkins on the Barrier Range, also commemorate Watkins.
