= Creswick (disambiguation) =

Creswick, Victoria is a town in Australia

Creswick may also refer to:

Places

- Creswick railway station in Victoria, Australia
- Electoral district of Creswick in Victoria, Australia
- Shire of Creswick, former local government area in Victoria, Australia
- Creswick Gap, gap near Creswick Peaks in Antarctica
- Creswick Peaks, group of mountains in Antarctica
- Northland, Wellington, suburb in New Zealand formerly called Creswick

People

- Alice Creswick (1889–1973), executive of the Australian Red Cross Society
- Benjamin Creswick (1853–1946), English sculptor
- Harry Creswick (1902–1988), British librarian
- Henry Creswick (1824–1892), Australian cricketer
- Nathaniel Creswick (1831–1917), founder of football club Sheffield FC
- Phil Creswick (born 1965), member of boy band Big Fun
- Thomas Creswick (1811–1869), English landscape painter
- William Creswick (1813–1888), English actor
- Creswick Jenkinson, Australian screenwriter
