= Orion Massif =

Coordinates: 70°23′S 66°47′W

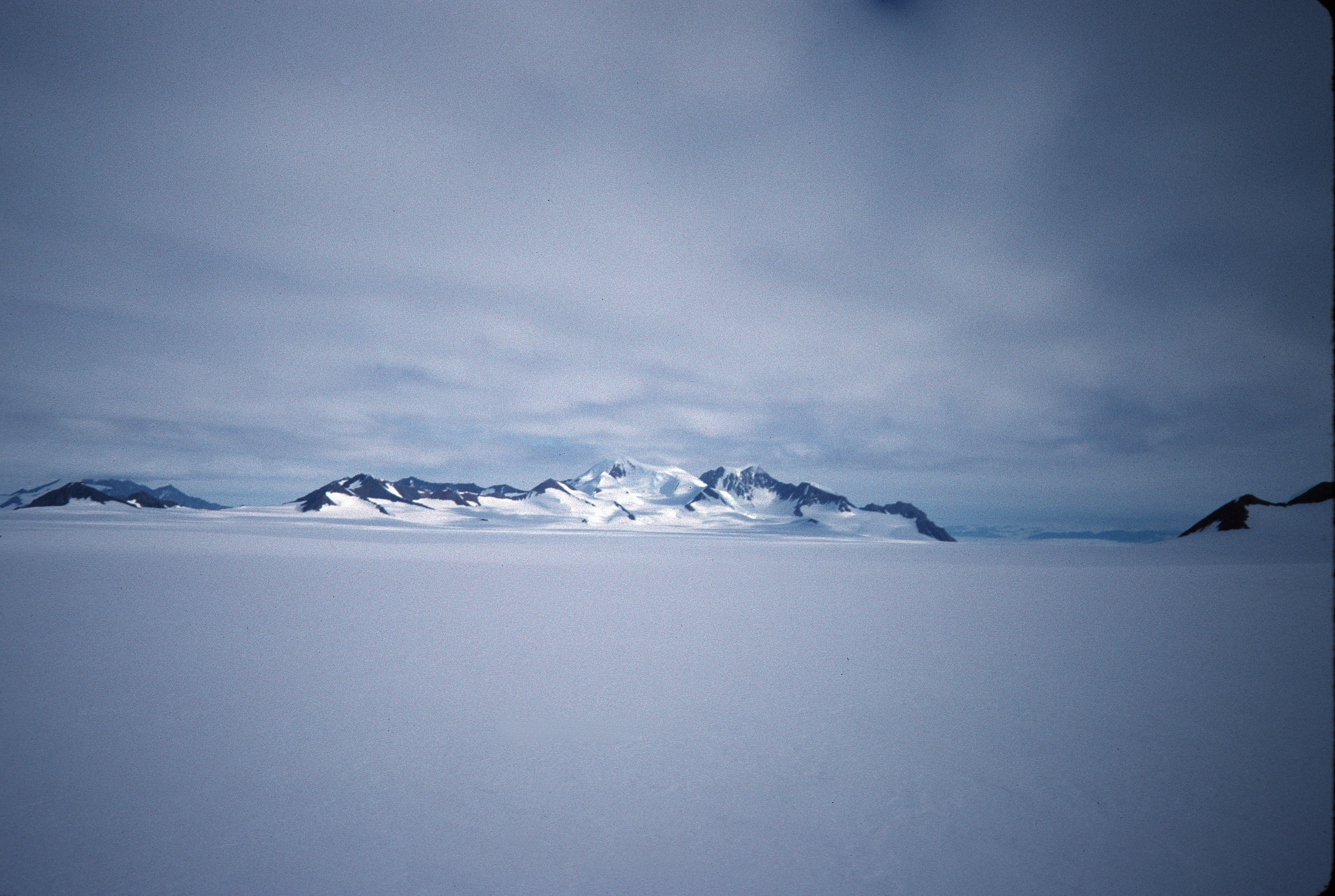
Orion Massif from Creswick Peaks

Orion Massif is a prominent massif located in Palmer Land, Antarctica. It is 14 nautical miles (26 km; 16 mi) long and consists of a complicated network of peaks, passes, ridges, and cirques. It is located 4 nautical miles (7.4 km; 4.6 mi) east-northeast of Scorpio Peaks, between the upper parts of Meiklejohn and Millett Glaciers, and 5 nautical miles (9.3 km; 5.8 mi) south of Goettel Escarpment. The highest peak is Mount Rigel.

It was named by the United Kingdom Antarctic Place-Names Committee in 1976 after the constellation of Orion.
