= Willey Glacier =

Glacier in Antarctica

Willey Glacier (70°25′S 67°50′W) is a heavily crevassed glacier north of Creswick Peaks in Palmer Land, flowing west from Creswick Gap into George VI Sound. Named by United Kingdom Antarctic Place-Names Committee (UK-APC) for Lawrence E. Willey, British Antarctic Survey (BAS) geologist at Fossil Bluff and Stonington Island stations, 1966–69 and 1973, and awarded the Polar Medal for services to Antarctic Survey in 1976.
