= Creswick Gap =

Creswick Gap (70°23′S 67°44′W), in Antarctica, is a gap between the Creswick Peaks and the Campbell Ridges on the west side of Palmer Land. The gap extends from Chapman Glacier to Meiklejohn Glacier and provides a safe sledging route from George VI Sound via Naess Glacier and Meiklejohn Glacier to the Dyer Plateau of Palmer Land. It was named by the UK Antarctic Place-Names Committee in association with the Creswick Peaks at the south end of the gap.
