= Goettel Escarpment =

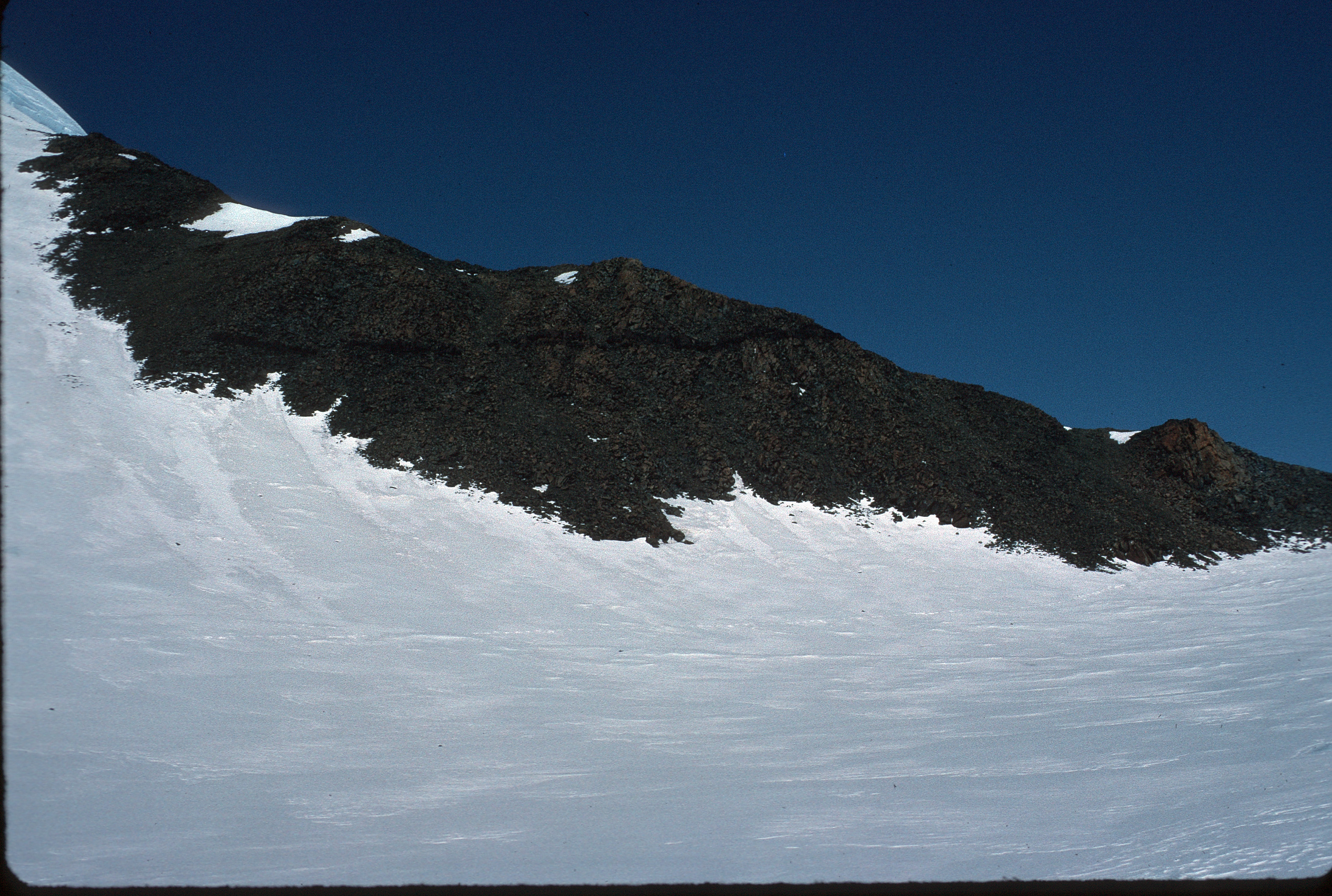
Goettel Escarpment

Location of Goettel Escarpment Palmer Land, Antarctica

Goettel Escarpment (70°14′S 66°55′W) is a prominent escarpment buttressing the Dyer Plateau located 5 nautical miles (9 km) north of Orion Massif and near the head of Chapman Glacier in Palmer Land.

It was named by the Advisory Committee on Antarctic Names for Captain Frederick A. Goettel, U.S. Coast Guard, commanding officer of USCGC Westwind (WAGB-281), in support of construction of the new Palmer Station, during Operation Deep Freeze, 1967.
