= Tesselaar Tulip Festival =

Annual festival in Silvan, Victoria, Australia

The Tesselaar Tulip Festival is held in Silvan, Victoria every spring, displaying more than 120 varieties of tulips are shown on a 55-acre farm. This tulip farm was initiated by a couple of Dutch immigrants, Cees and Johanna Tesselaar. They arrived in Melbourne in 1939 and started to grow tulips, gladioli and daffodils on their land. After purchasing more land in Silvan, they grew more tulip bulbs, which attracted people to stop by on their property and admire their fields. In 1954, the Tesselaars open the farm to the public, with a coin donation for the Australian Red Cross. In 2017, around 900,000 tulip bulbs were planted using modern machinery, and 80,000 bulbs are still planted traditionally by hand. The tulip festival has evolved to include music, food and wine festival to attract more visitors during the spring season (September - October).

In 2020 the Festival was cancelled, for the first time, due to COVID-19 lockdown rules.

== Gallery ==
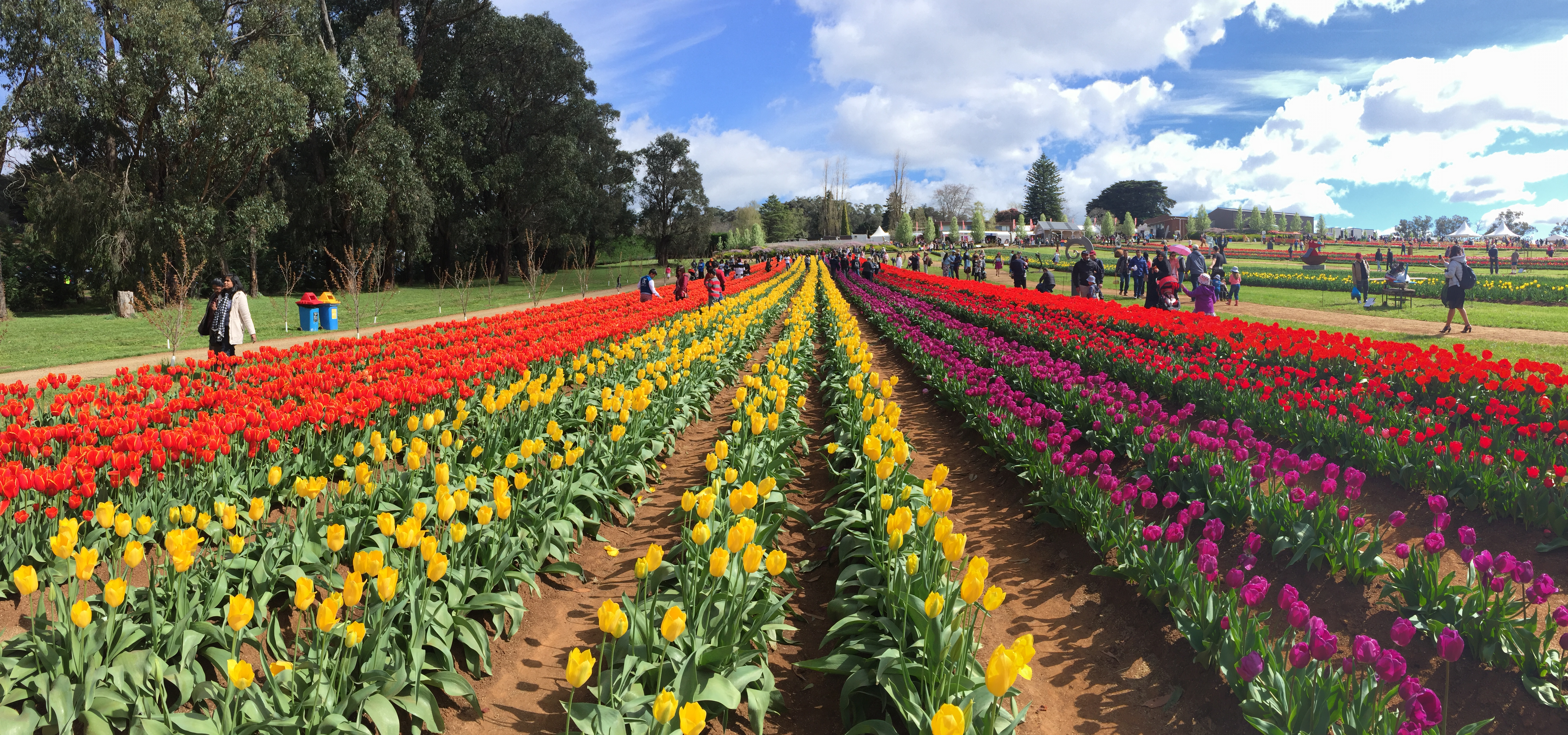

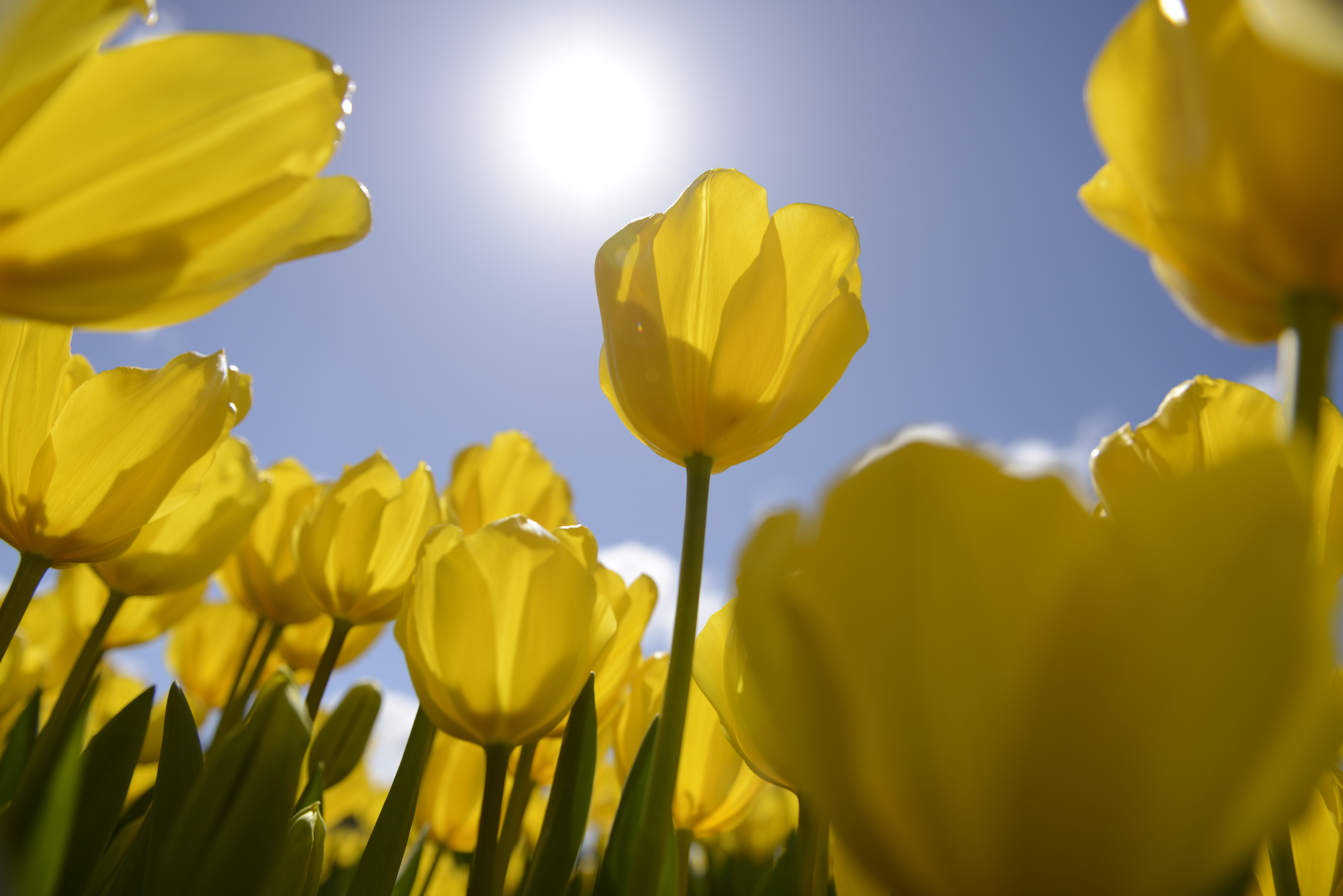

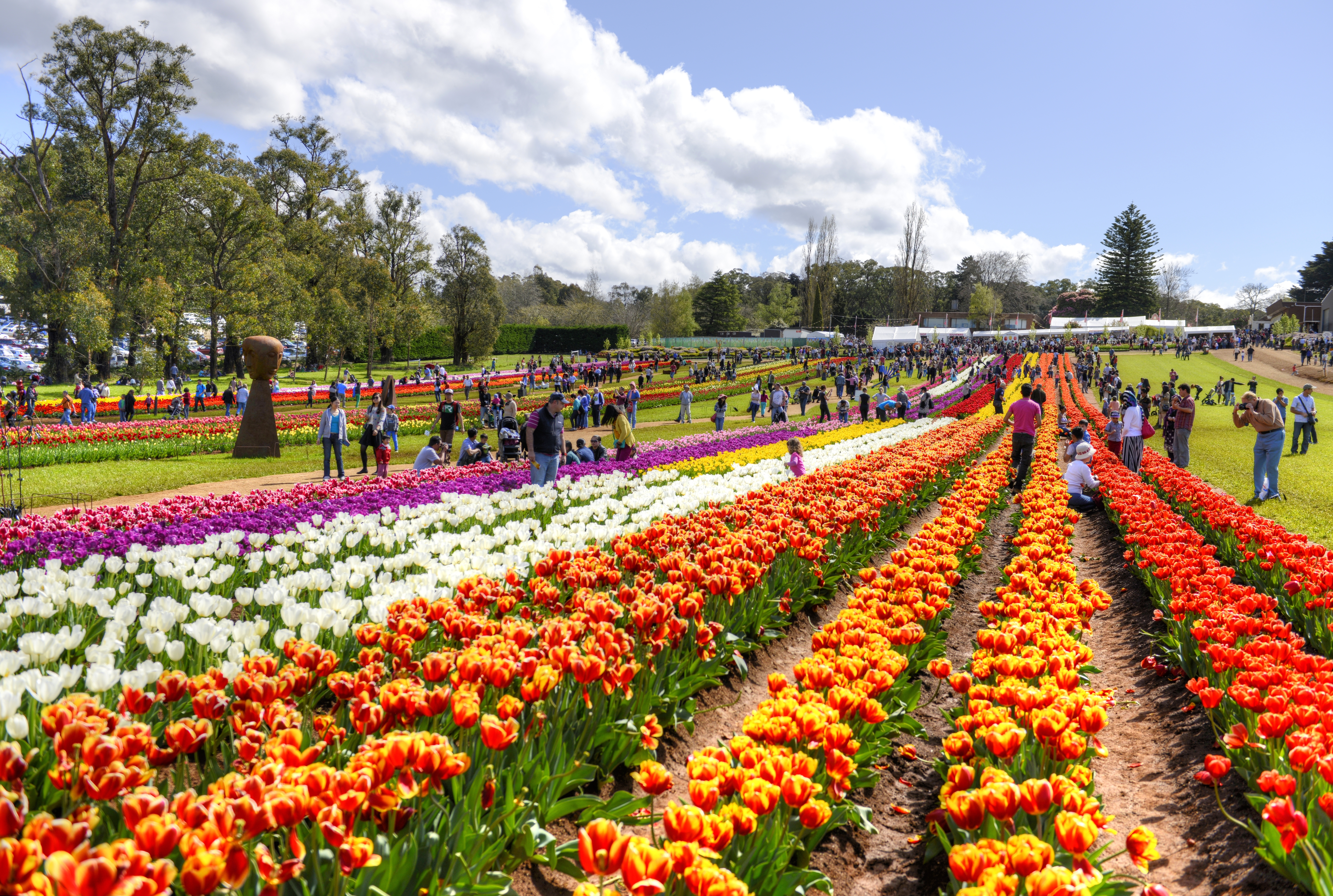

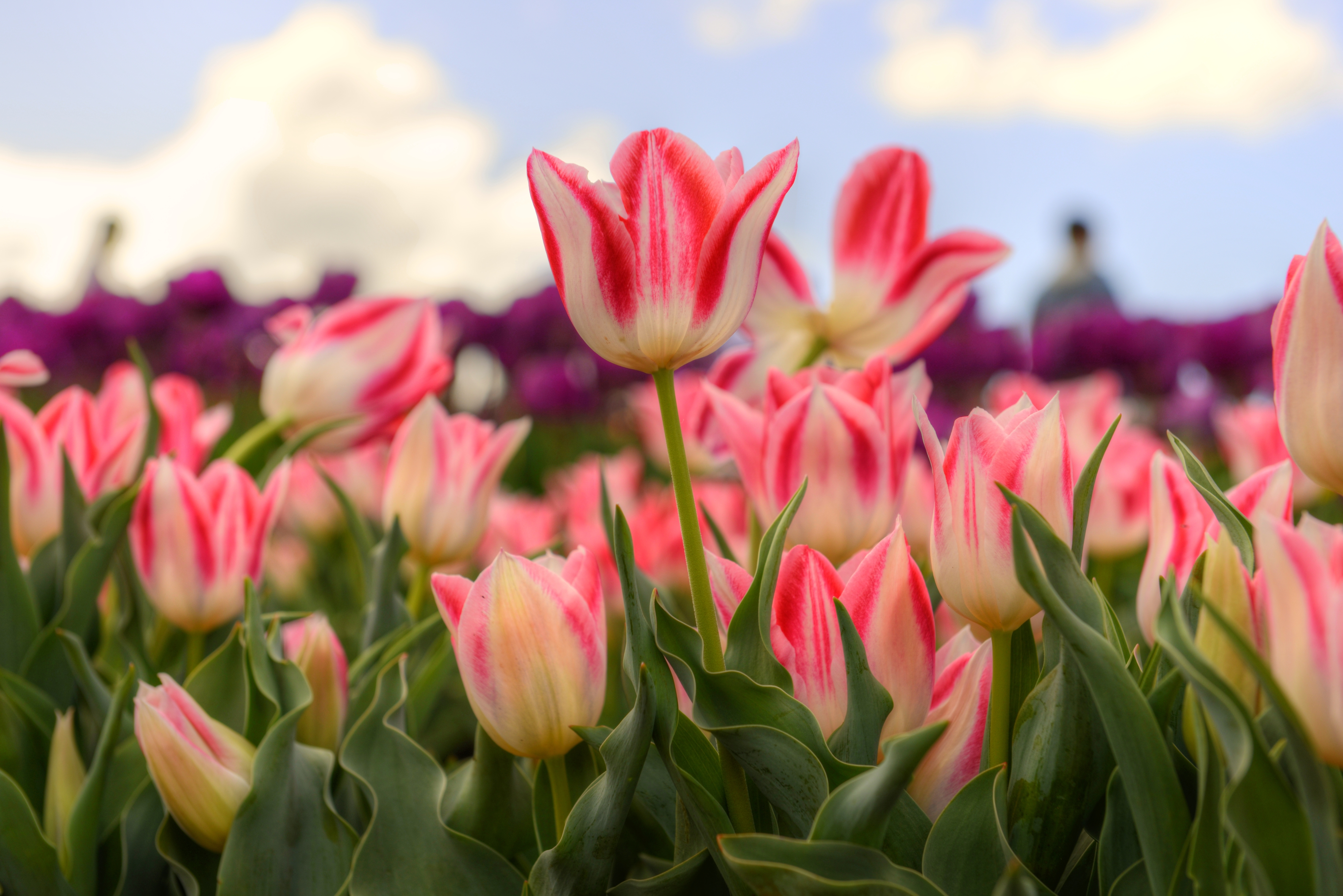

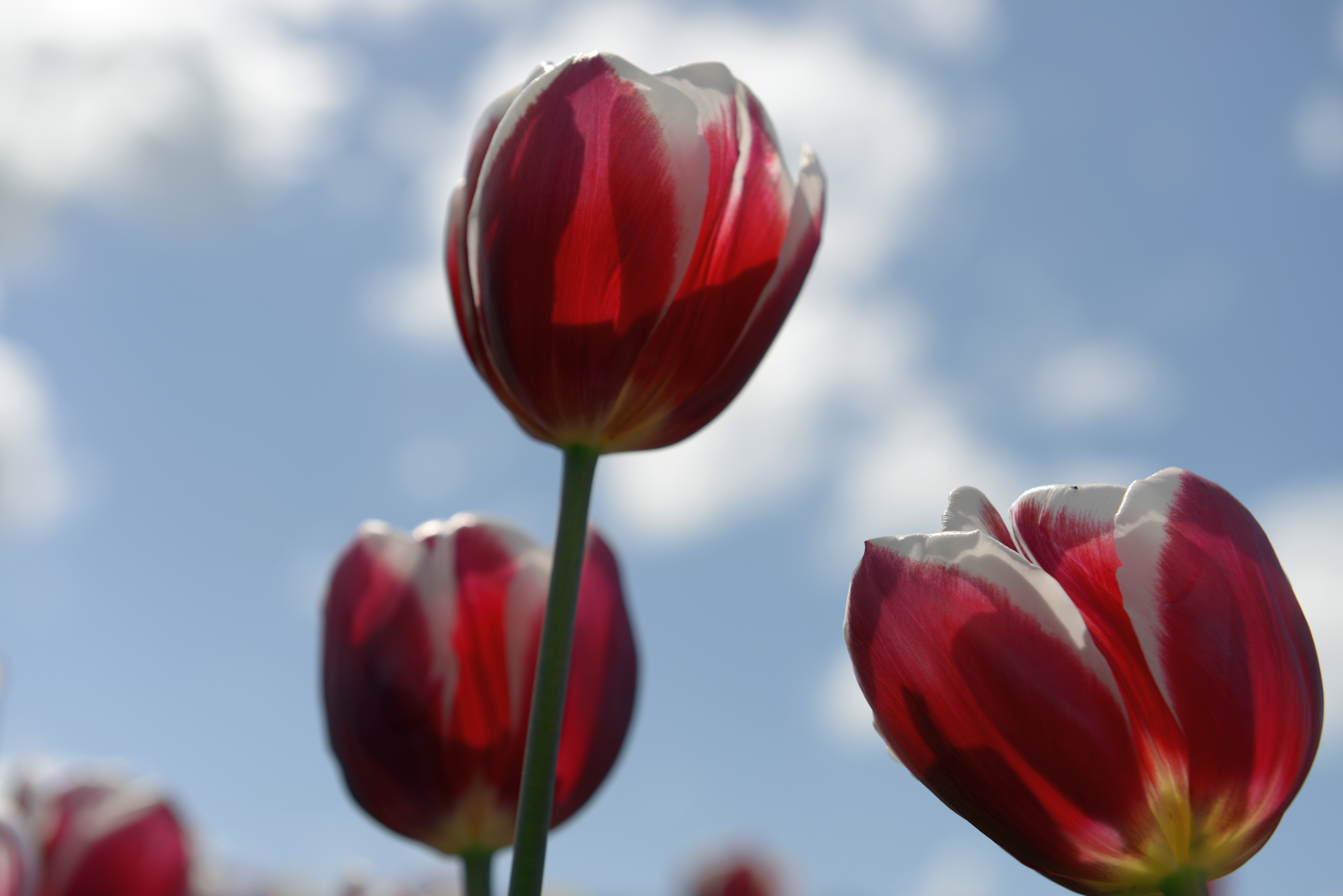

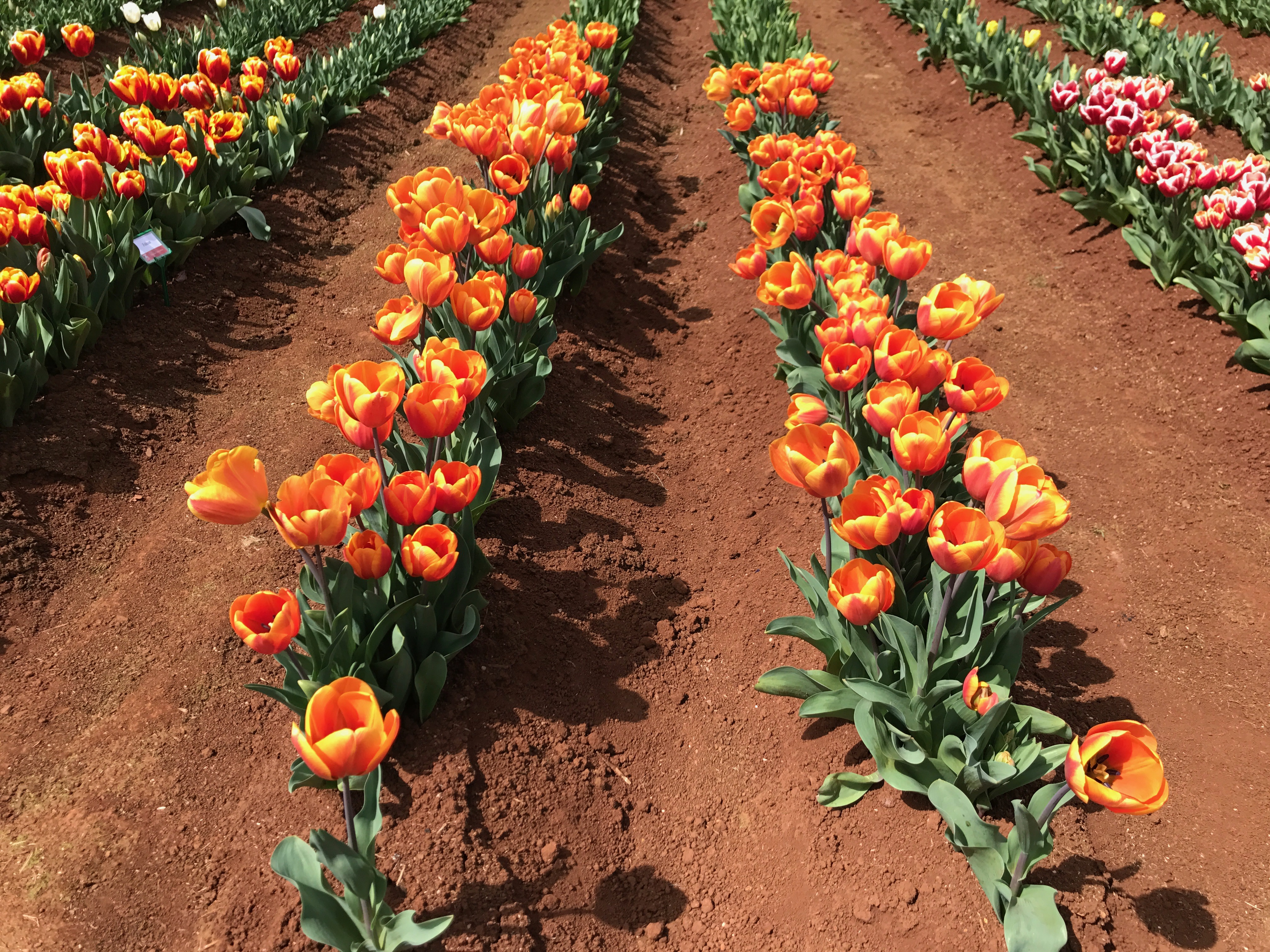

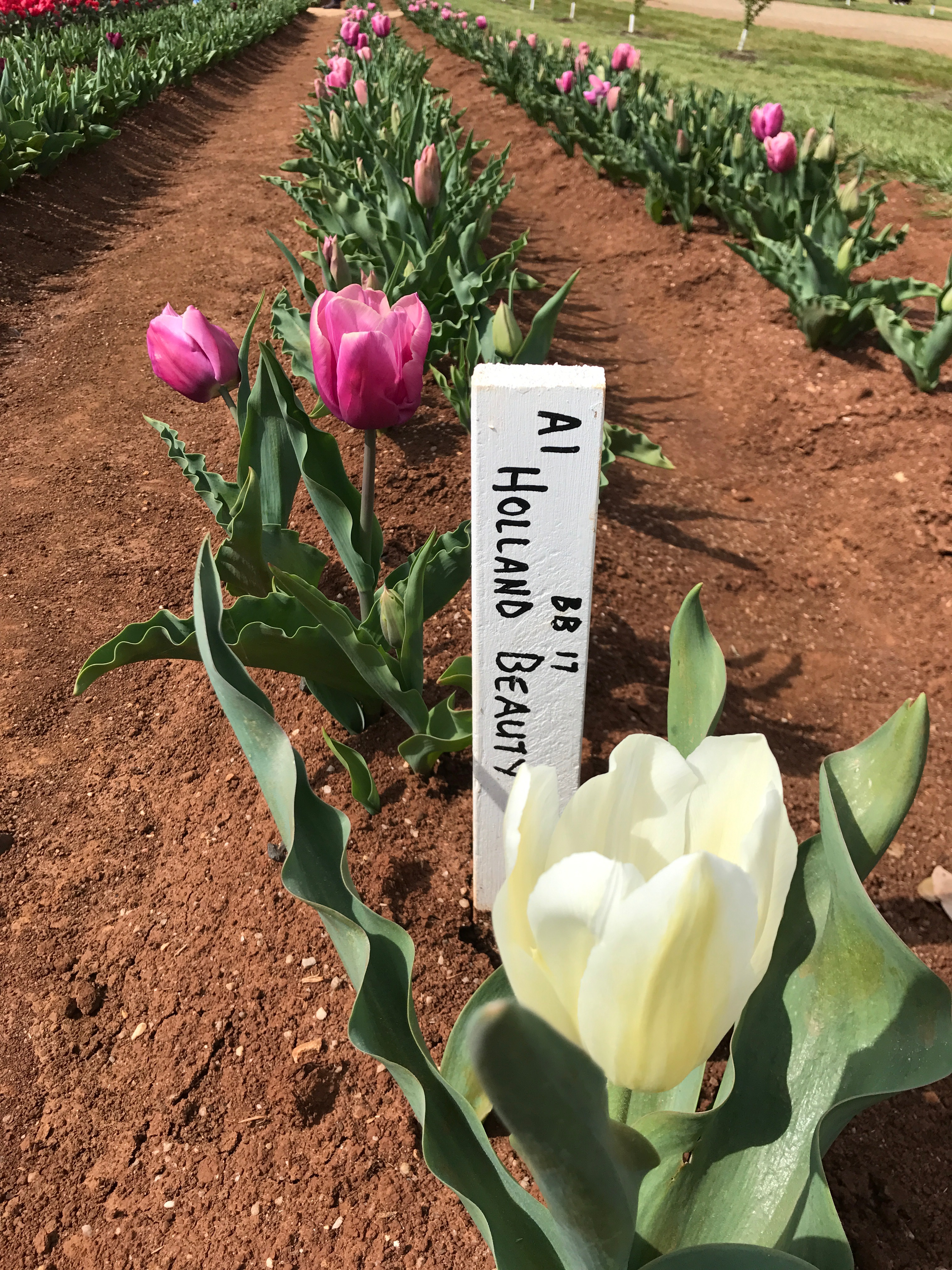

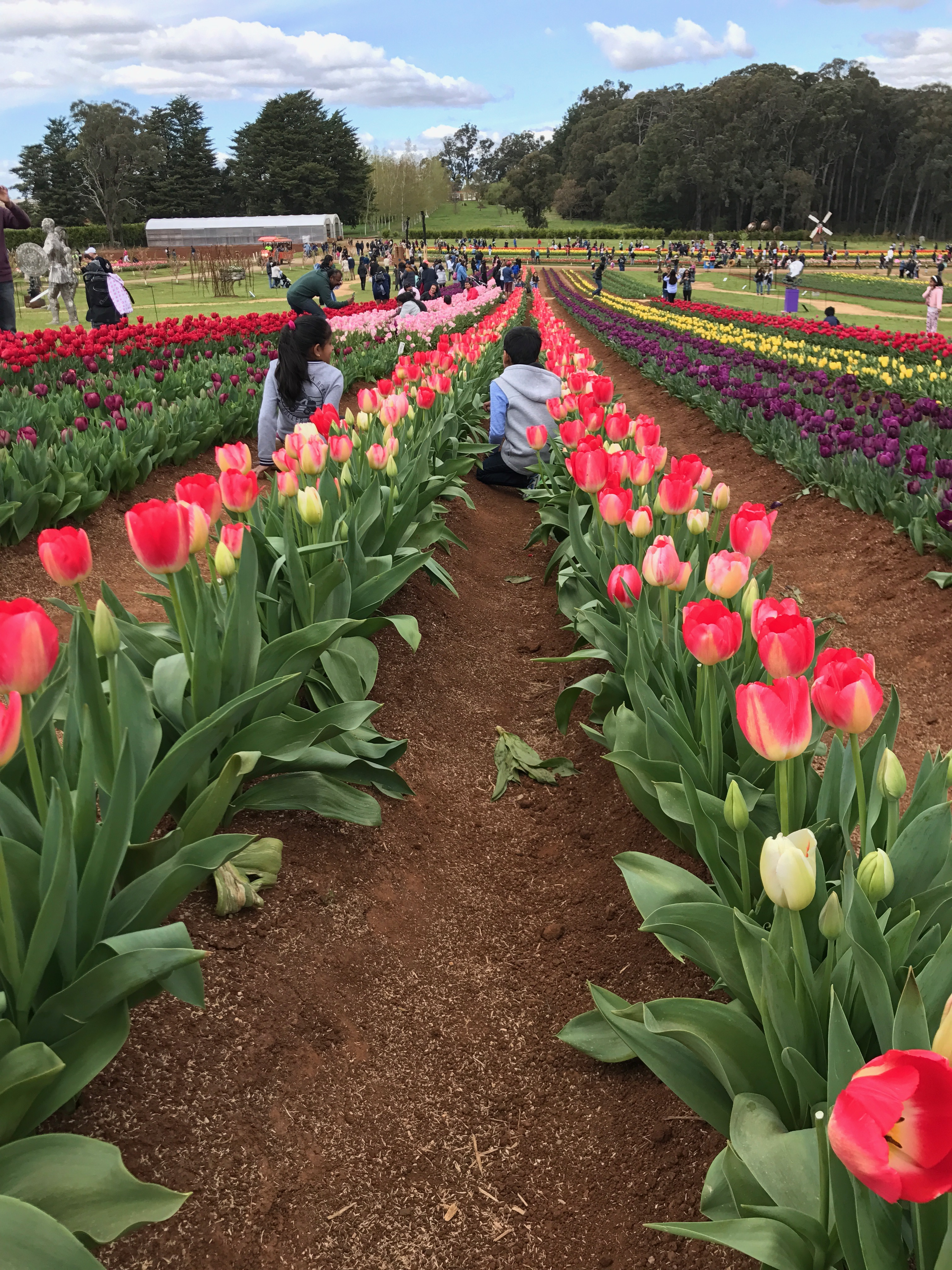

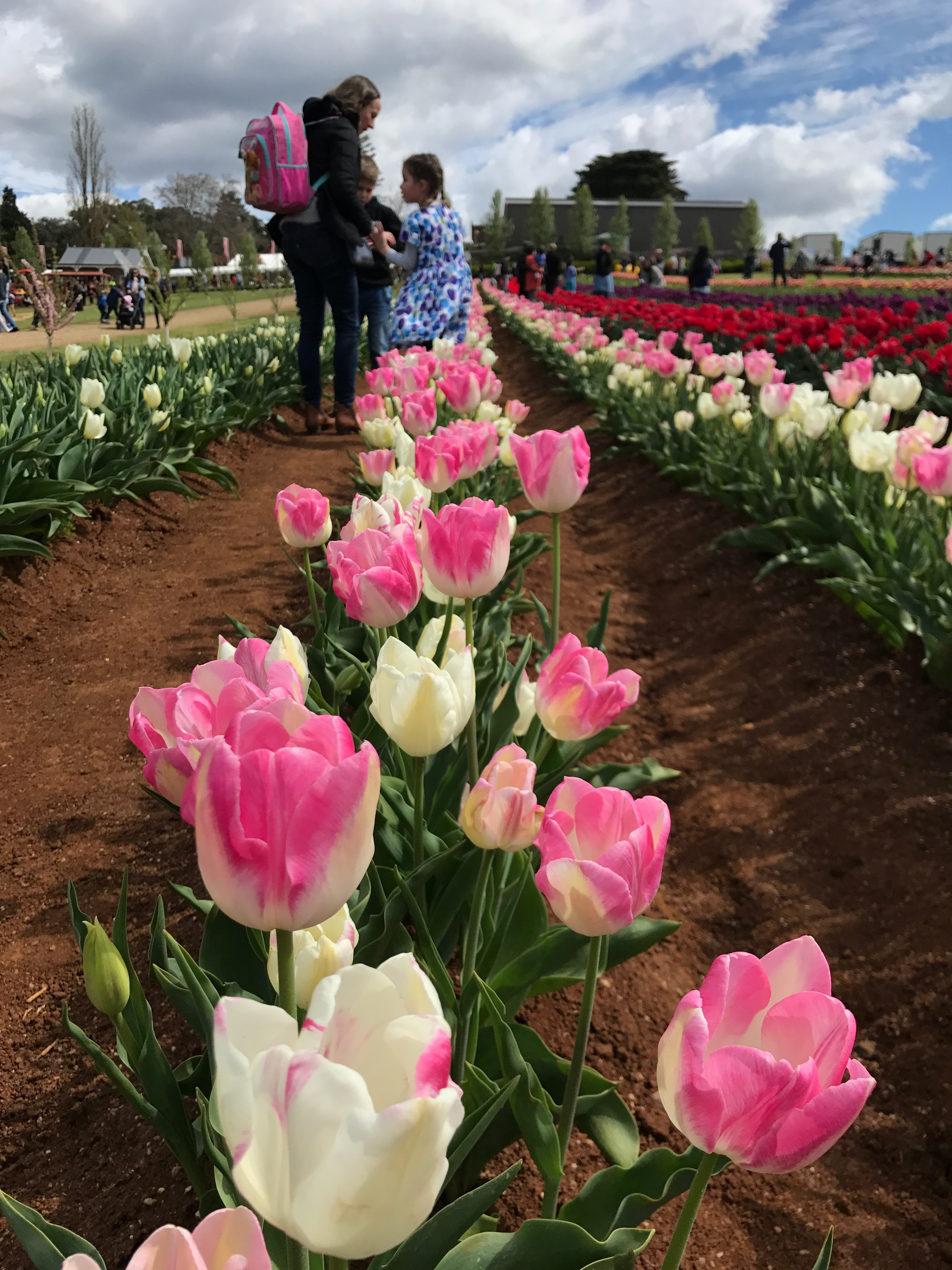

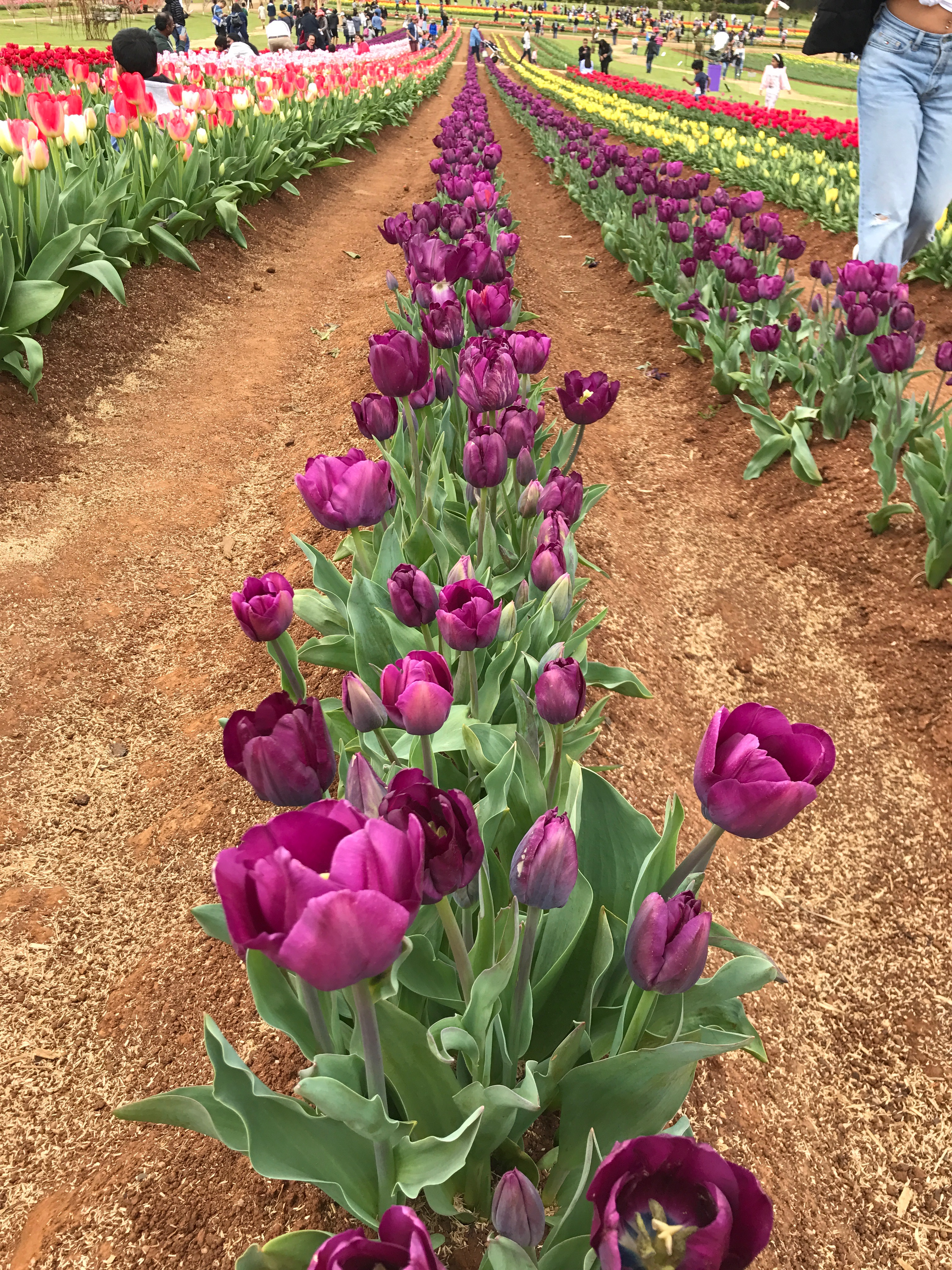

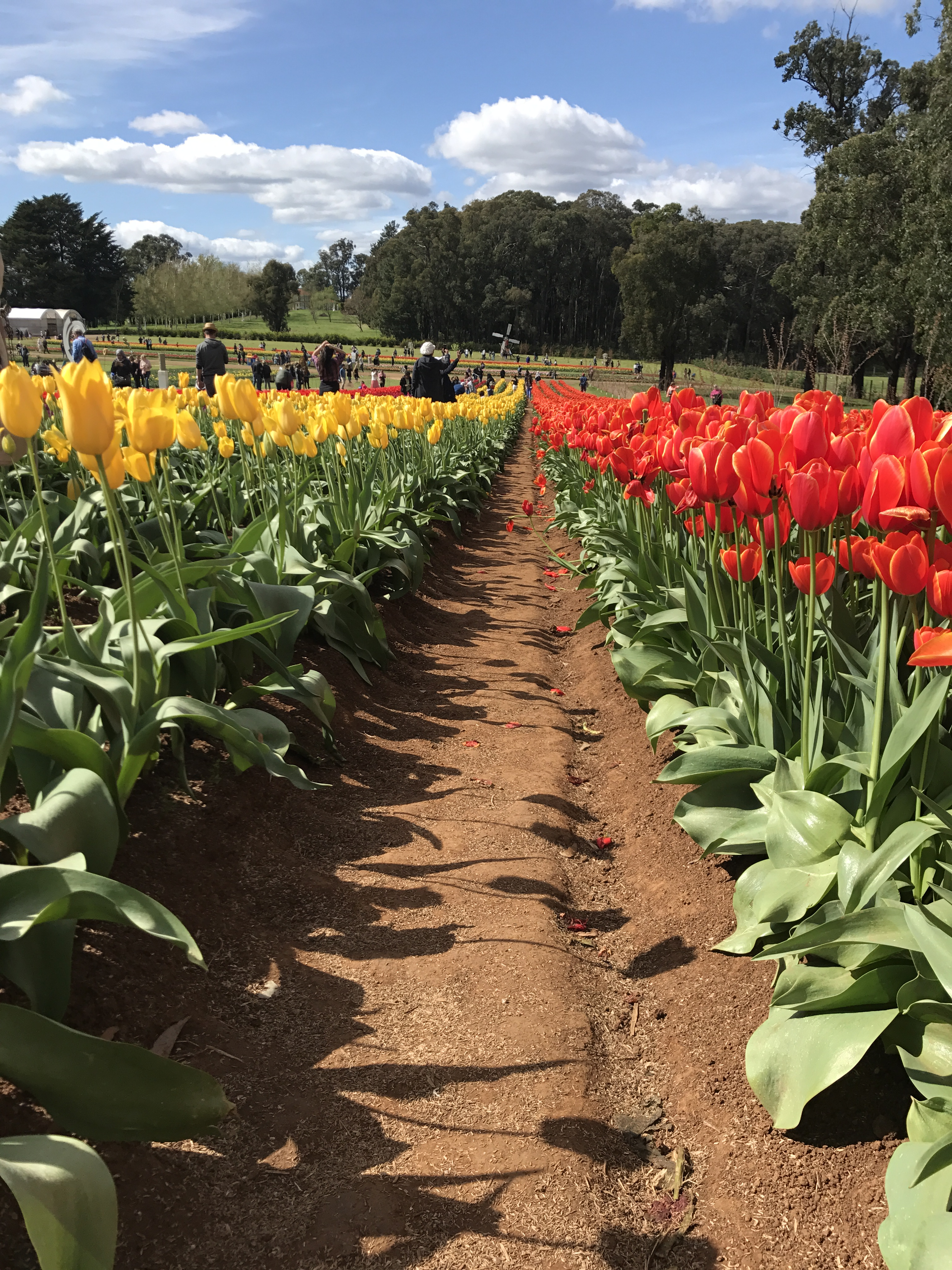

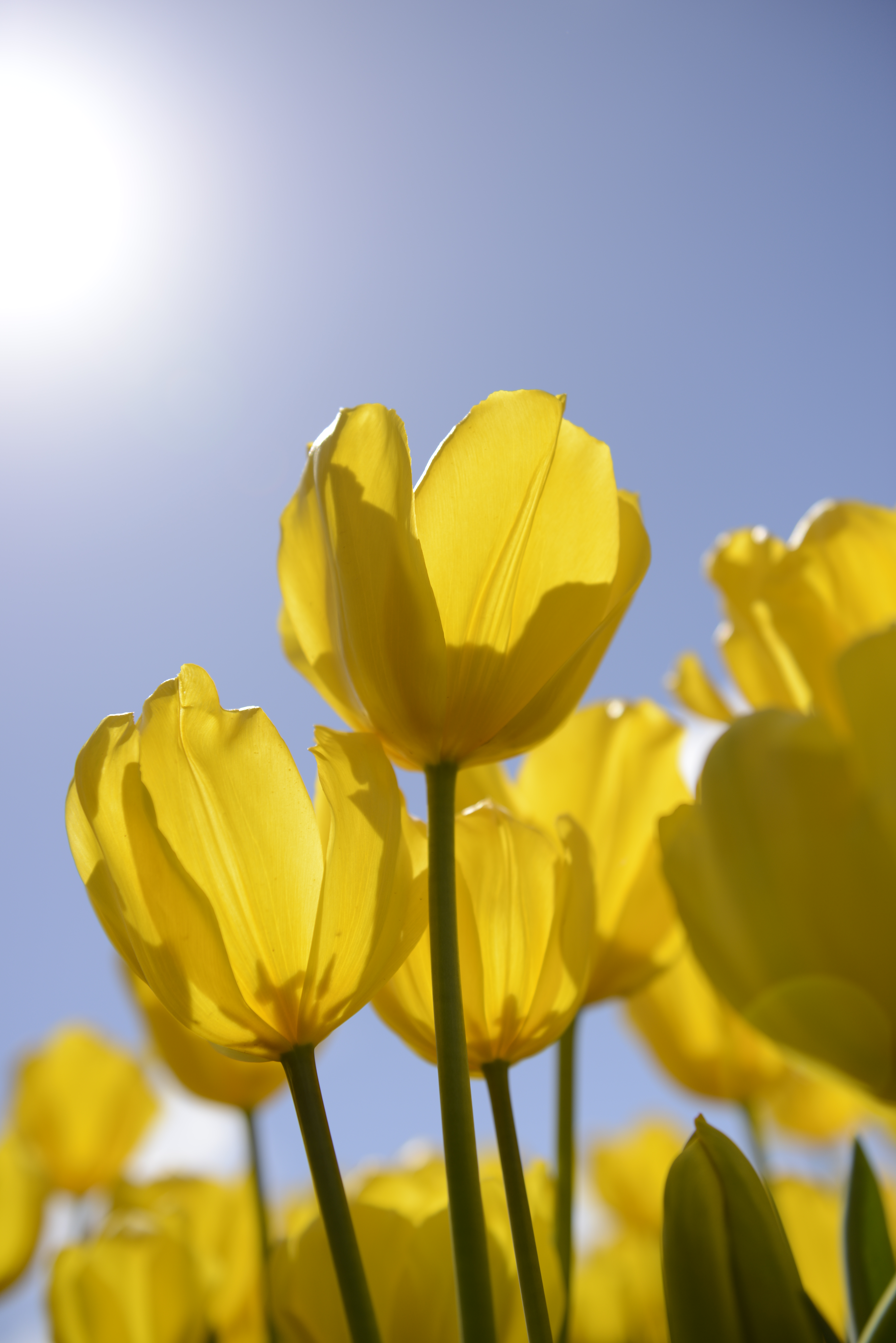

== See also ==
- Gardening in Australia
