= Campbell Ridges =

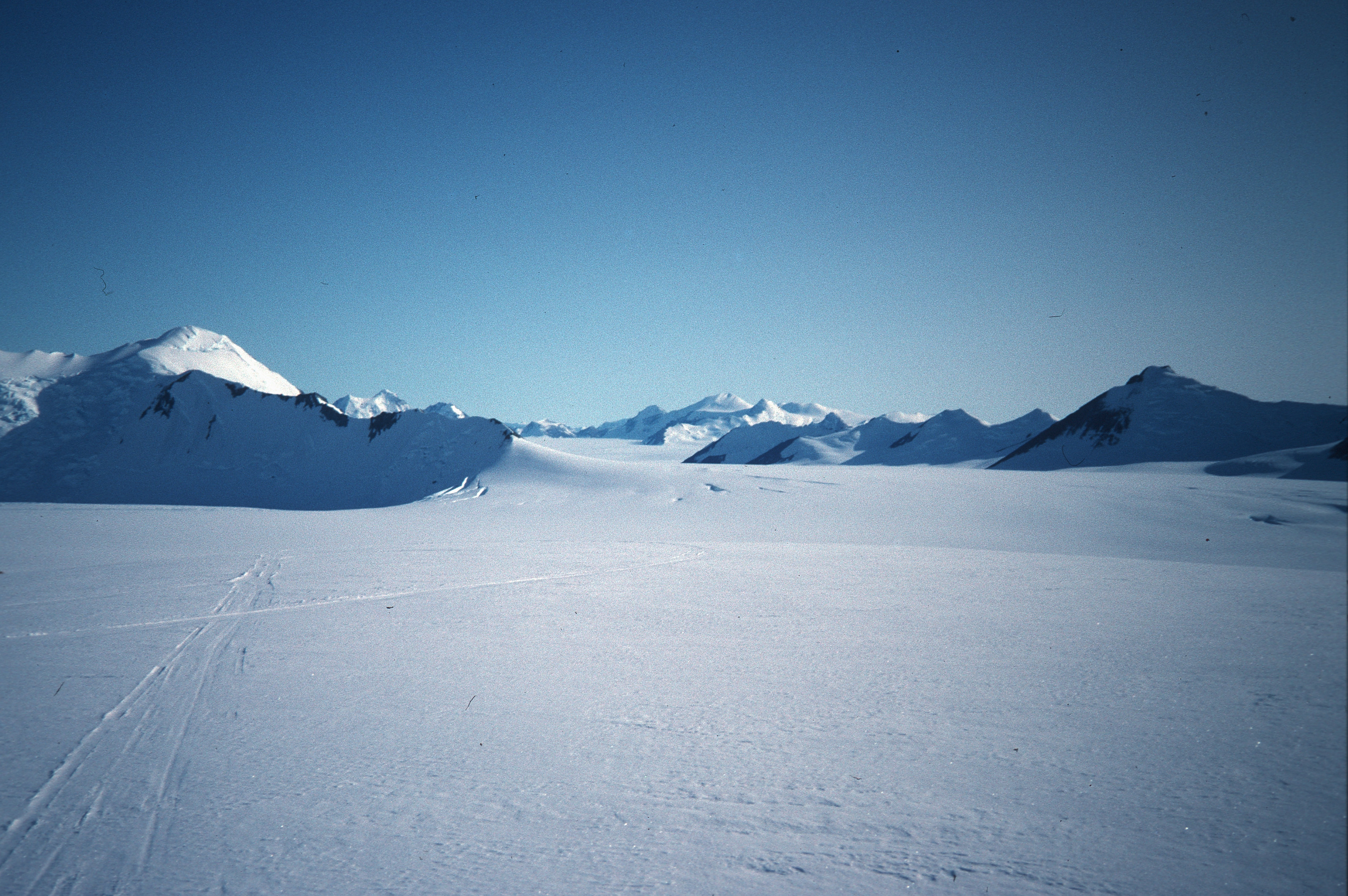
Campbell Ridges seen from Creswick Peaks

The Campbell Ridges (70°23′S 67°35′W) are an irregular complex of ridges between Creswick Gap and Mount Courtauld in Palmer Land. Two north–south ridges are linked by an east–west ridge, on which stand the highest peaks. They were named by the Advisory Committee on Antarctic Names for Lieutenant Commander Bruce H. Campbell, U.S. Navy, Commander of LC-130 aircraft in support of United States Antarctic Research Program field parties on the Lassiter Coast and elsewhere, 1969–70 and 1970–71.
