= Chapman Glacier =

Chapman Glacier may refer to:

- Chapman Glacier (Palmer Land)
- Chapman Glacier (Victoria Land)
