= Karna Birmingham =

Australian artist, illustrator and print maker

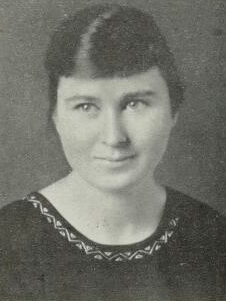
- Born: Karna Maria Birmingham; 3 December 1900; Mosman, Sydney, NSW, Australia
- Died: 5 July 1987 (aged 86); Neutral Bay, Sydney, NSW, Australia
- Occupations: Artist & Illustrator

Karna Maria Birmingham (3 December 1900 – 5 July 1987) was an Australian artist, illustrator and print maker. She was best known for her numerous illustrations of children's books.

== Life and training ==
Birmingham was born in the Sydney suburb of Mosman, the daughter of Irish doctor and published black & white artist. Herbert Joseph Birmingham, and Karn Marie Nielsen, a Dane and her father's live-in maid. After completing school at Loreto, Kirribilli, Birmingham went on to study at the Julian Ashton Art School in Sydney from 1914 - 1920.

Birmingham married twice, however both husbands died in tragic circumstances. Her first husband, John Robert Torney, who Birmingham married in 1934 died from suicide in 1935. Birmingham was married to botanist Arthur Alva Livingstone from 1940 living in Gosford until his death in 1951 by self inflicted gunshot wounds.

In 1938, Birmingham contracted an eye disease, trachoma, which limited her sight and her career.

After her husband's death, Birmingham returned to the Sydney suburb of Turramurra until moving to a nursing home in nearby Neutral Bay shortly before her death.

== Works ==
From her time at Art School, Birmingham was hailed for her pen and ink work and identified as a student with promise.

Birmingham exhibited work at the Anthony Hordern Fine Art Gallery in 1921 along with other notable women painters such as Dorrit Black, Viola Macmillan Brown, Myra Cocks, Alice Creswick, Olive Crane, Grace Crowley, Anne Dangar, Marlon Ferrier, Georgina Hughes, and Bell Walker. She also featured her linocuts at numerous exhibitions

In 1934, Birmingham wrote and illustrated a children's book of verse Skippety Songs and illustrated numerous others.

Her work is represented in the collections of the National Gallery.
