= Tulip festival =

Large display of tulips as a celebration

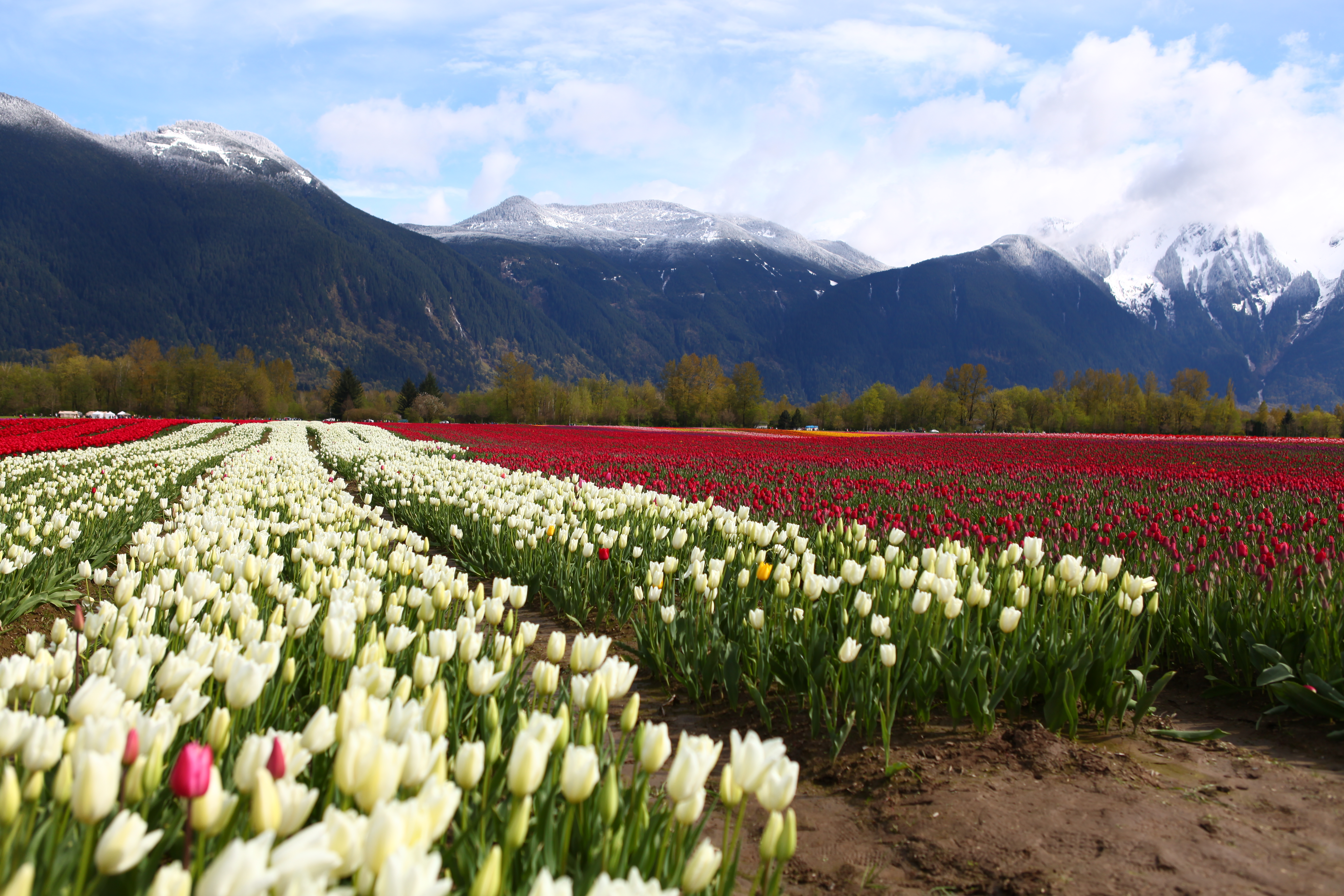
2013 Tulip Festival at Agassiz, BC, Canada

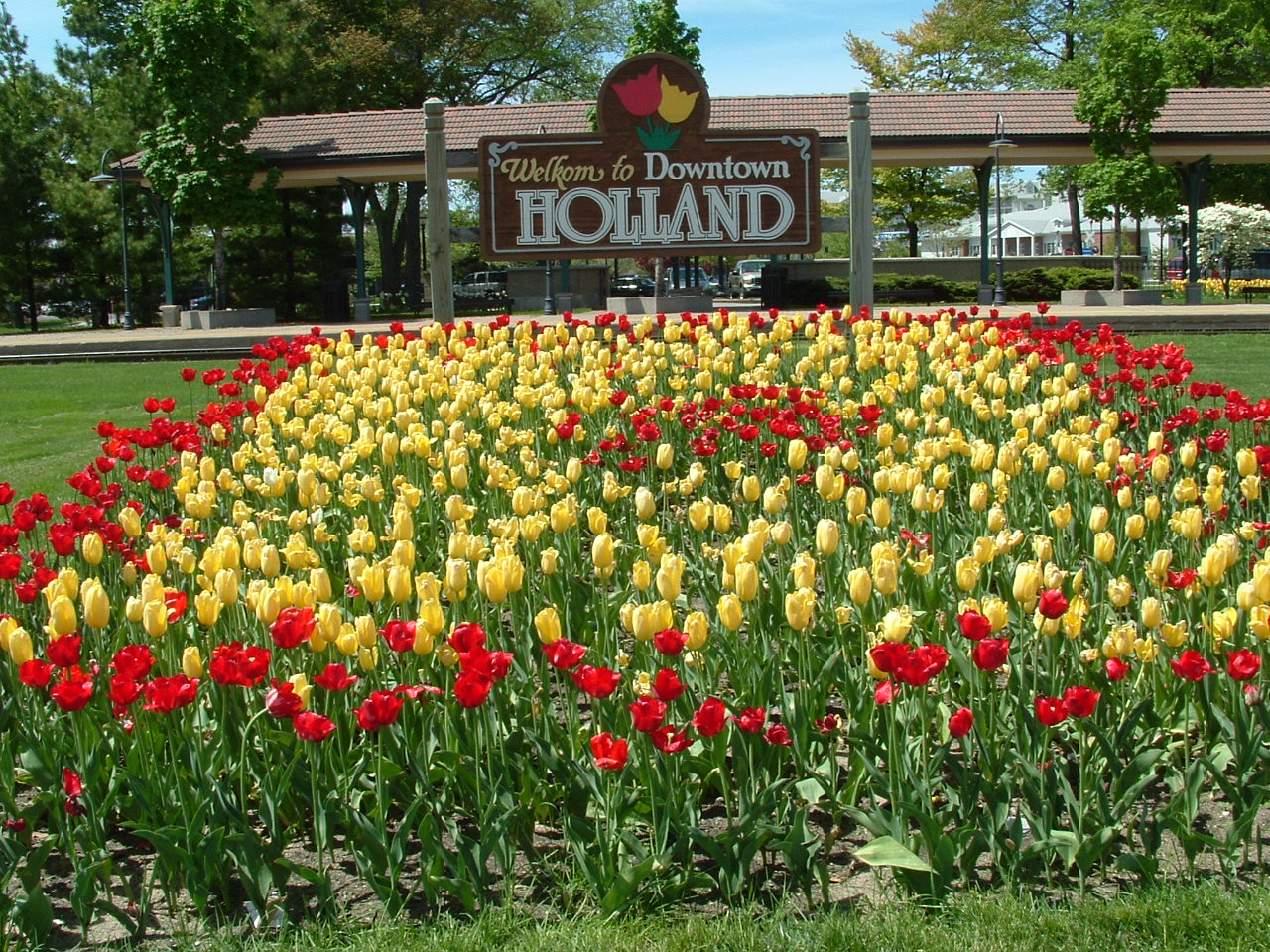
Holland, Michigan is the home of the Tulip Time Festival, the largest tulip festival in the U.S.

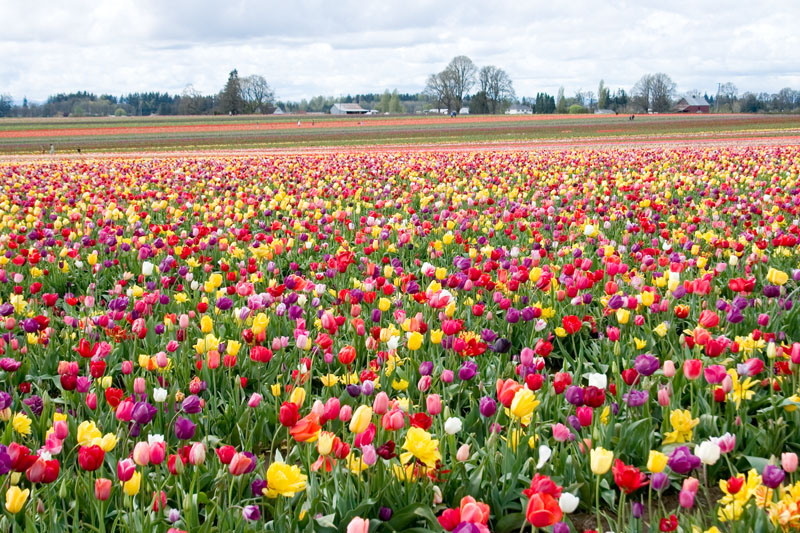
Wooden Shoe Tulip Festival in Woodburn, Oregon, 2007

Tulip Festival, Mount Vernon, Washington, 2007

Tulip festivals are held in several cities around the world, mostly in North America, usually in cities with a Dutch heritage such as Albany, New York; Ottawa, Ontario; Gatineau, Quebec; Montreal, Quebec; Holland, Michigan; Lehi, Utah; Orange City, Iowa; Pella, Iowa; Mount Vernon, Washington; and Woodburn, Oregon, and in other countries such as New Zealand, Australia, India, and England. The tulips are considered a welcome harbinger of spring, and a tulip festival permits residents to see them at their best advantage. The festivals are also popular tourist attractions. The tulips are displayed throughout the cities. In certain years the peak of tulips does not coincide with the actual festival due to climatic conditions.

The world's largest tulip festival is held in Ottawa, Canada, with tulips sent by the Netherlands to commemorate the special relationship resulting from Canadian actions during World War II when Canadian forces led the liberation of the Netherlands and hosted the Dutch royal family in exile.

== Asia ==
- Srinagar, Jammu and Kashmir, India, celebrates Tulip Festival in the month of April in the Indira Gandhi Memorial Tulip Garden, situated over an area of 30 ha on the banks of world famous Dal Lake, considered to be the largest Tulip garden in Asia.
- Tonami, Toyama, Japan holds a tulip festival with over 2.5 million tulips in over 600 varieties. It takes place from late April to early May and is known as the "Tonami Tulip Fair" in Tonami Tulip Park.

== Europe ==
- Spalding, Lincolnshire, UK, had an annual Tulip Parade that took place on the first Saturday in May until 2013. In its heyday it was a major tourist attraction, comprising a procession of floats on various themes, each decorated with tulip petals, a by-product of the bulb industry. Tulips are no longer grown commercially in this part of Lincolnshire.
- National Tulip Day, Amsterdam, Netherlands. Tulip festival in Amsterdam. Every year in January.
- Istanbul Tulip Festival, Istanbul, Turkey. International tulip festival in Istanbul. Every year in April.

== Americas ==
=== Canada ===
- The Canadian Tulip Festival, which claims to be the world's largest tulip festival, is a major event held annually each May in Ottawa, Ontario, Canada. During World War II, the Dutch royal family took refuge in Canada. Princess Margriet of the Netherlands was born at Ottawa Civic Hospital in 1943, and the Canadian government declared the land to be extraterritorial. This was done to ensure that the princess would have solely Dutch citizenship. Furthermore, Canadian forces led the liberation of the Netherlands. Every year since, Queen Juliana and the royal family after her death, along with the Dutch Bulb Growers Association, have sent tulip bulbs for the festival to commemorate the special relationship.

=== United States ===
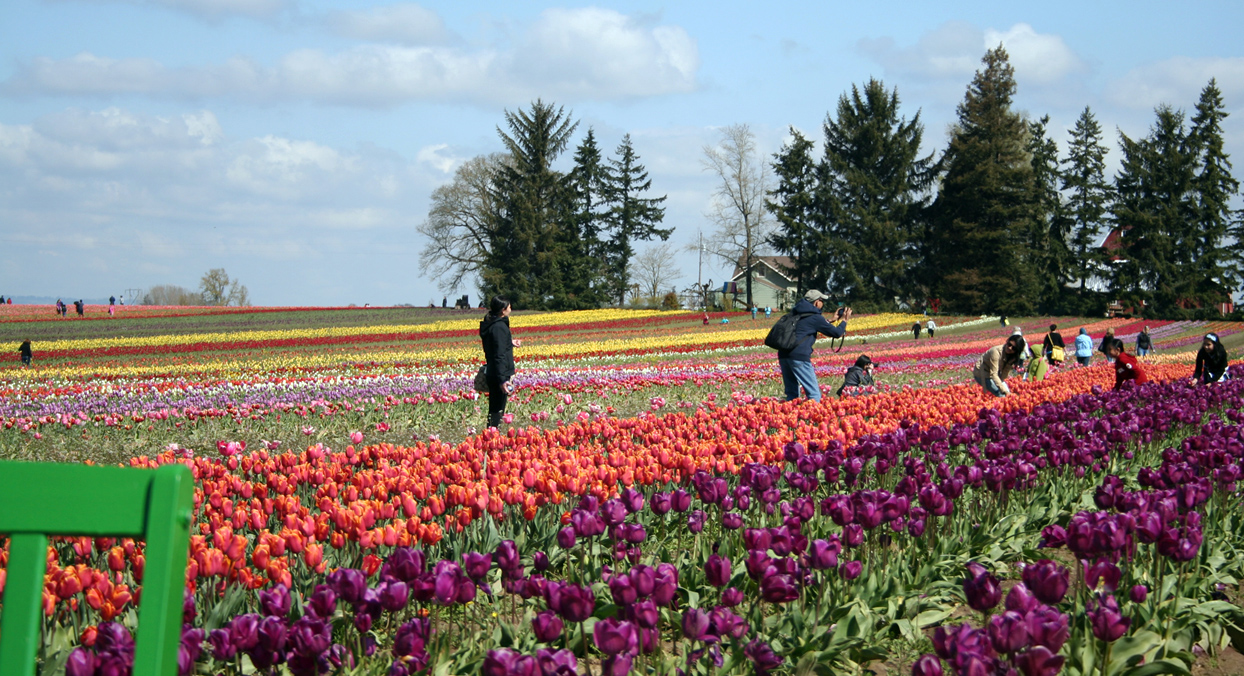
Tulips fields in full bloom on Earth Day, 2011, in Oregon's Willamette Valley.

The tulip-festivals are being held in honour of the Dutch-American immigrants who brought the (then highly expensive) tulips to the Americas.

==== Eastern US ====
- Holland Ridge Farms U-Pick Tulips in Cream Ridge, New Jersey. The most tulips available to pick, anywhere in the world.
- The Tulip Festival of Albany, New York is set in Albany's historic Washington Park. Each year, this traditional Albany event greets spring with thousands of tulips blooming in a myriad of colors and varieties. Thousands from across the Capital District and beyond come to Tulip Fest each May to celebrate Albany's rich Dutch heritage.
- The Festival of Spring at Burnside Farms in Nokesville, Virginia, includes over 200 types of tulips.

==== Central US ====
- Belle Plaine, Kansas, home of the Bartlett Arboretum has held its Tulip Time Festival on the third weekend in April since 1986 with arts and craft, live music, carnival, and other fun and games. Belle Plaine used to be famous for having the most tulips planted in one spot in the USA.
- Fulton, Illinois's Dutch Days festival is held the first weekend of every May. It was first celebrated as an "Authentic Dutch Dinner" in 1974 by the local Christian school.
- Orange City, Iowa's Tulip Festival is celebrated annually on the 3rd weekend in May is held dear by Orange City's inhabitants with a flower show, an evening performance of a Broadway play, afternoon and evening parades, and street dancing by old and young alike. The festival begins on Wednesday for the locals and continues through Saturday drawing over 150,000 people.
- Pella, Iowa's Tulip Time festival, also celebrated in early May, began in 1935 in celebration of the town's heritage. It is a three-day event that features street washing parades, costumed wooden shoe dancers, wooden shoe carving demonstrations, street vendors selling poffertjes and an antique Dutch street organ.
- The Tulip Time Festival in Holland, Michigan is held in early May and is the largest tulip festival in the United States, boasting over 4.5 million tulips and drawing over 600,000 visitors each year.

==== Western US ====
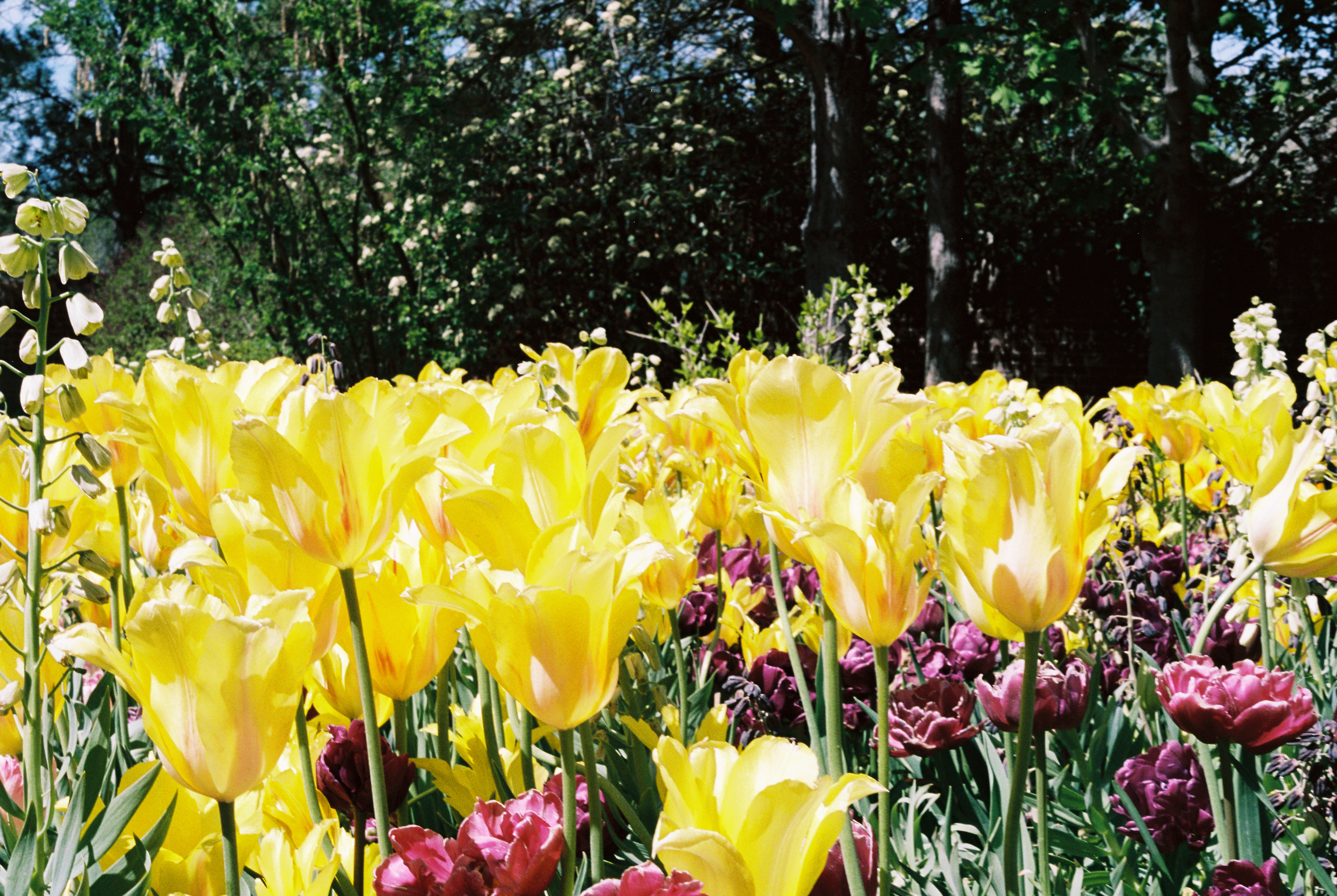
Tulips at Thanksgiving Point tulip festival May, 2018

- Lehi, Utah's Thanksgiving Point hosts a tulip festival during April and May. The three weekend festival includes daffodils and tulips, garden tours, performances, and activities. One Friday and Saturday weekend includes Dutch Days with Dutch music, dance, and food.
- Lynden, Washington's Holland Days festival is held the first weekend of every traditional song and dance, and Dutch markets.
- The Skagit Valley Tulip Festival in Washington has been held every April since 1984. Featuring dozens of tulip and daffodil fields as well as display gardens, gift shops, and tour activities, this festival attracts visitors of all ages.
- Woodburn, Oregon has held the Wooden Shoe Tulip Festival every year starting in March 1986.

=== Brazil ===
- The city of Holambra, São Paulo, is the largest producer of flowers and ornamental plants in Latin America and host the largest spring event in the continent, the Expoflora. The event starts late August and finishes on early September (start of Spring on Southern hemisphere) and it occurs every year since 1981. The event also have traditional Dutch music, dance and food.

== Oceania ==
=== New Zealand ===
- Wellington Tulip Sunday Festival, held each spring since 1944 (Website)

=== Australia ===
- Bowral, New South wales Tulip Time Festival, held each spring since 1960 (Website)
- Silvan, Victoria The Tesselaar Tulip Festival is held every September–October since 1954. (Website)

== Gallery ==
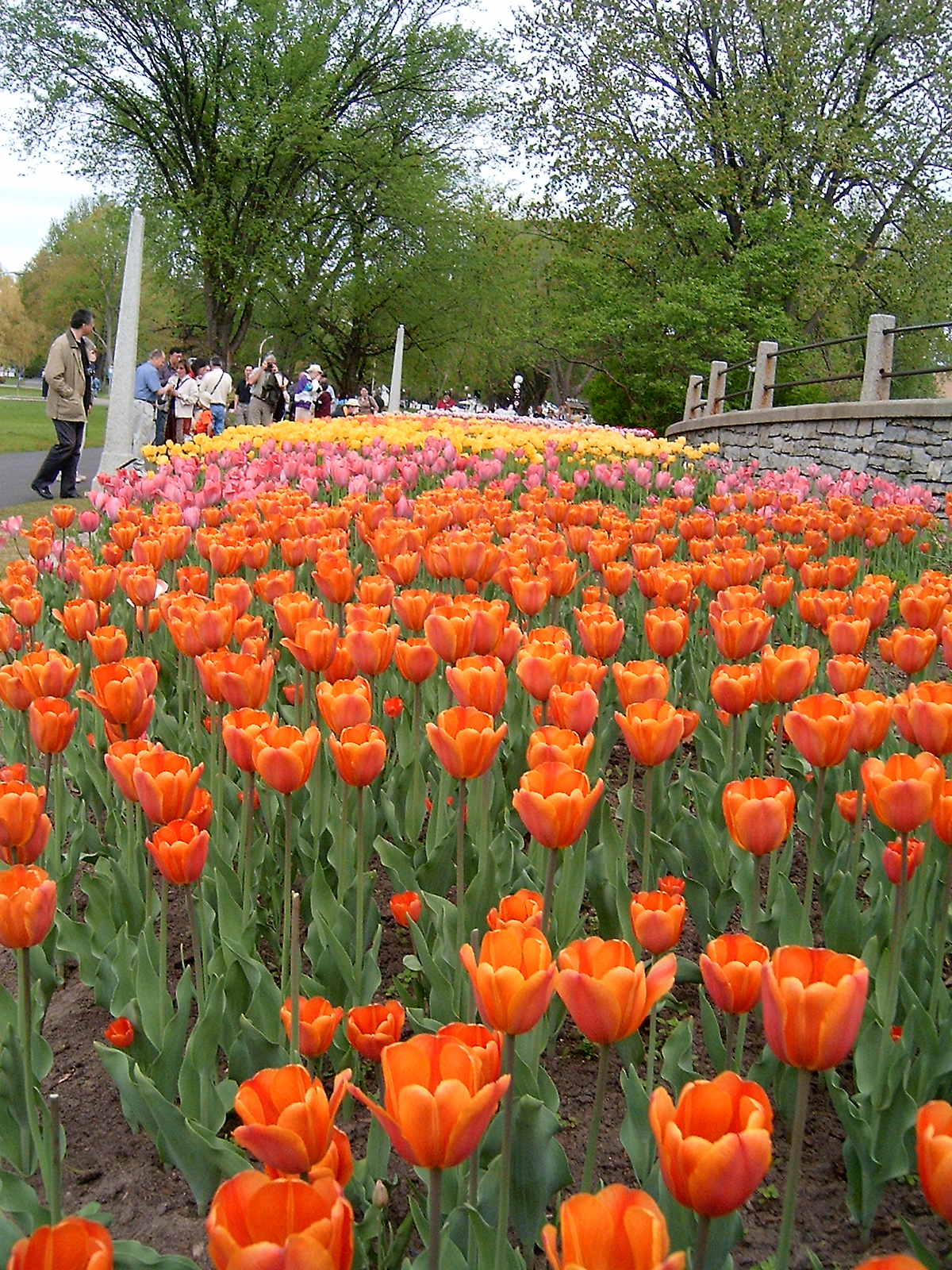
Tulips at Dow's Lake during 2005 Ottawa Tulip Festival

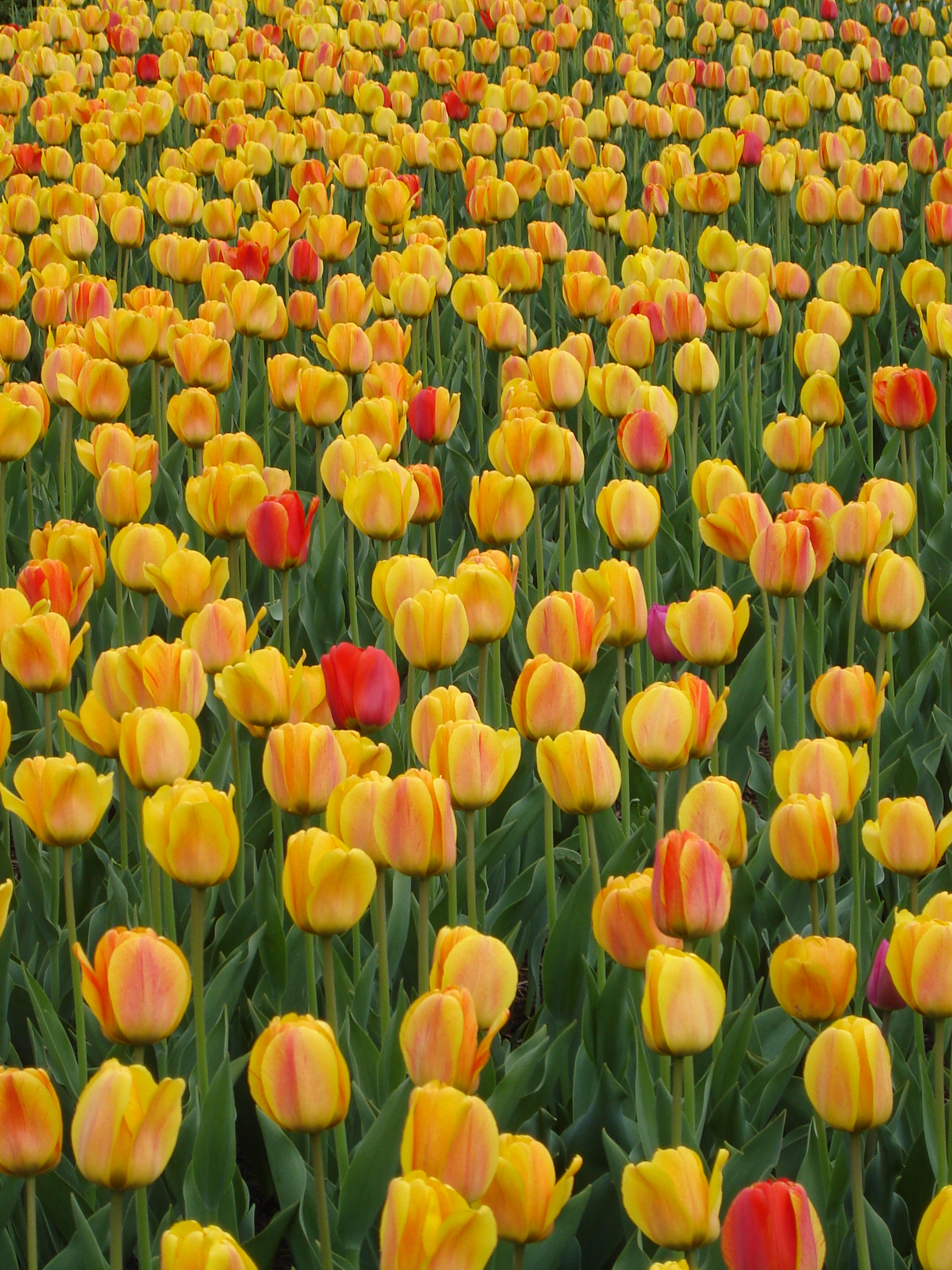
Canadian Tulip Festival in Ottawa, Ontario, 2007

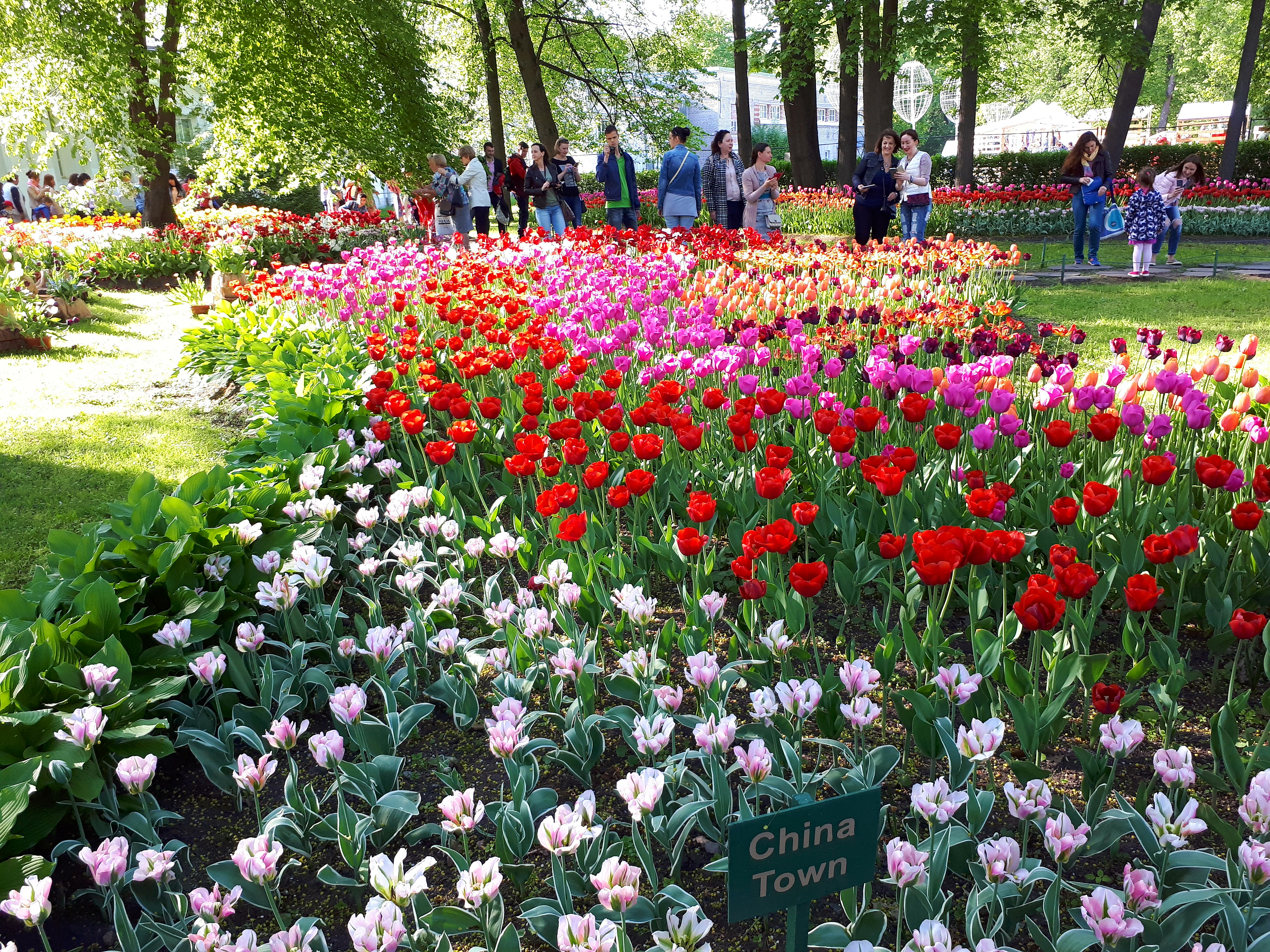
Tulip festival on Yelagin Island, 2018

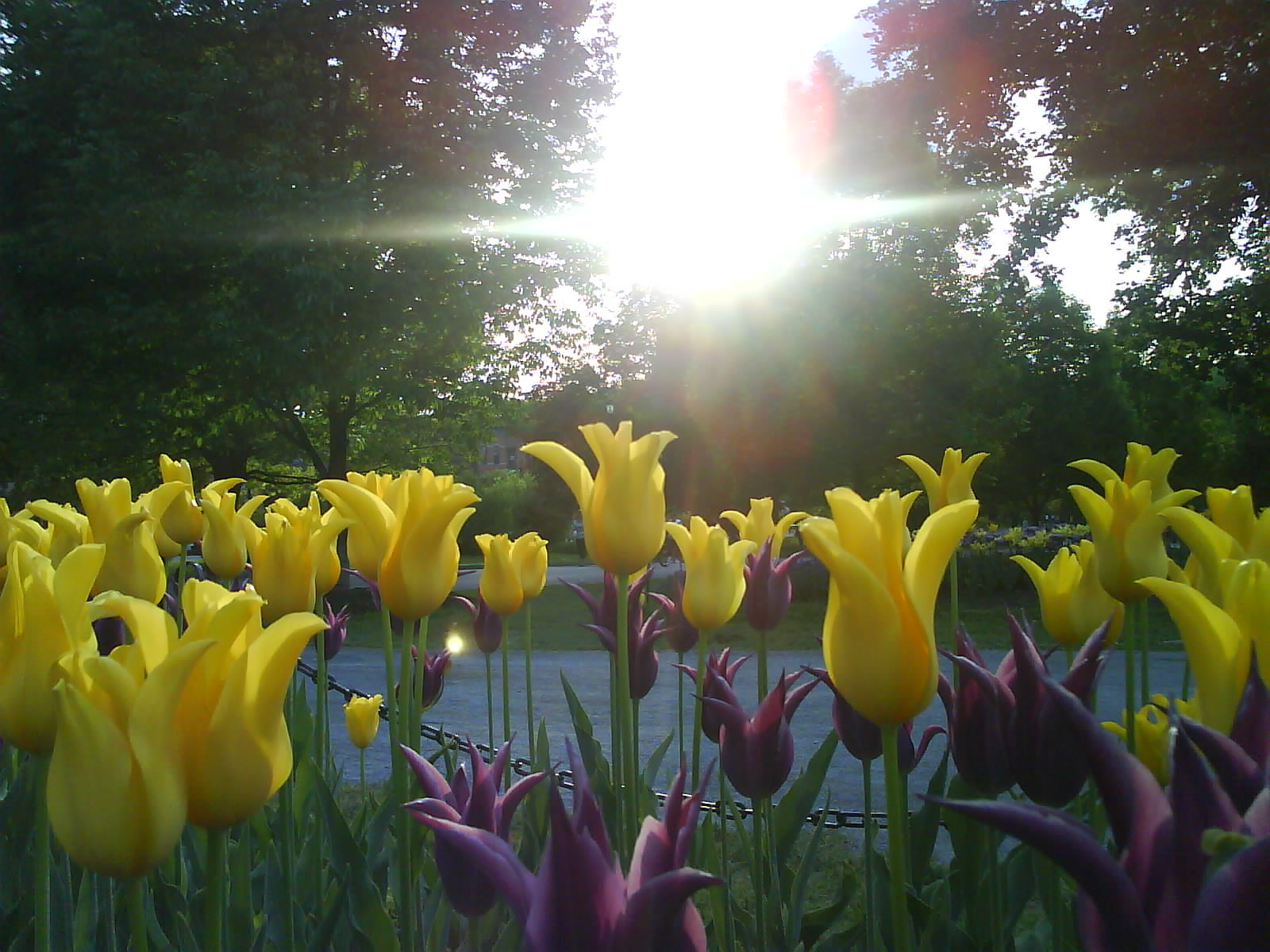
Tulip Festival, Albany, NY, 2008

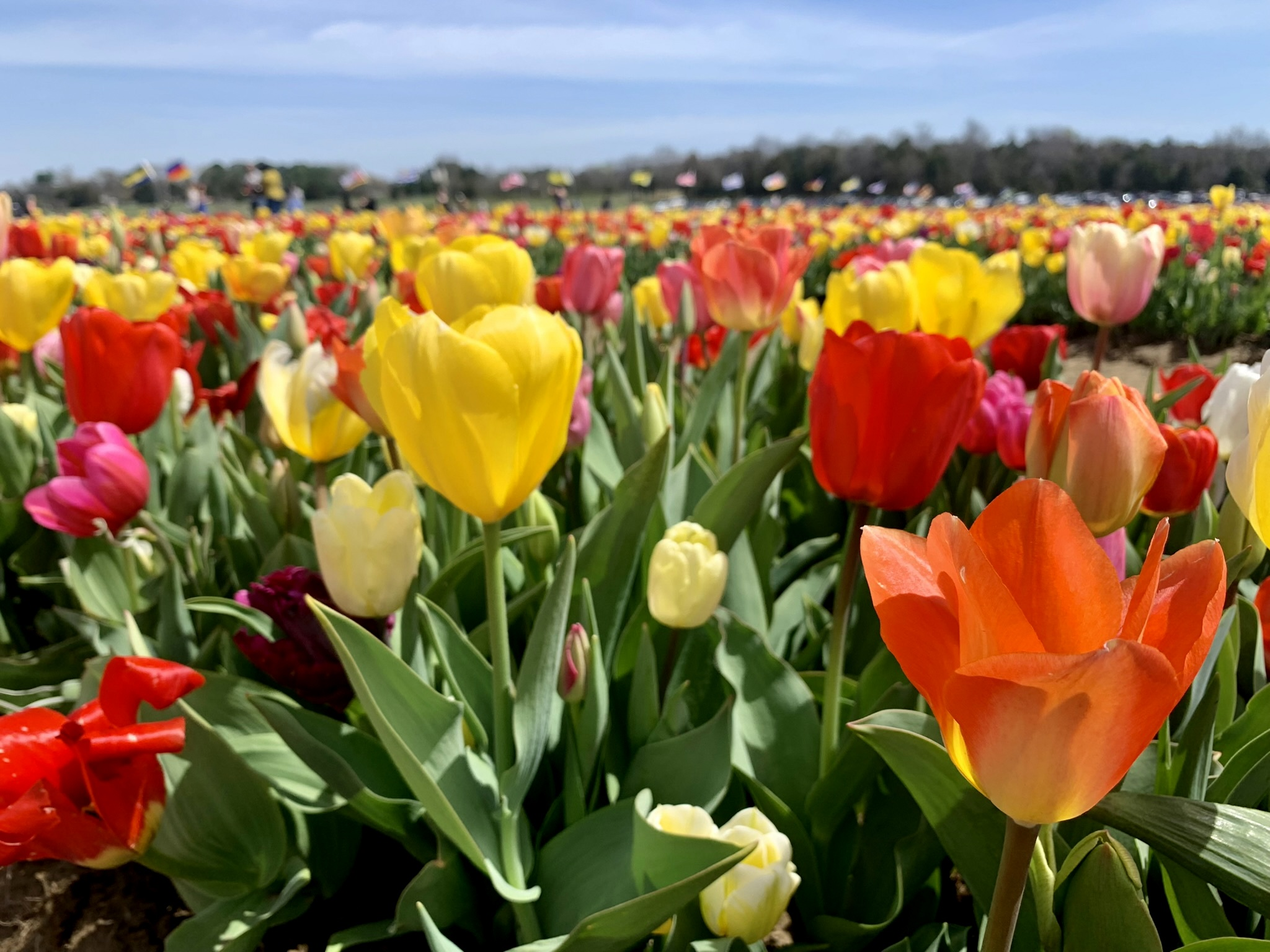
Festival of Spring, Nokesville, Virginia - 2022
