= Renner Peak =

Mountain in Antarctica

Renner Peak (70°21′S 67°50′W) is the dominant peak on the small mountain mass between Chapman and Naess Glaciers on the west coast of Palmer Land. Named by United Kingdom Antarctic Place-Names Committee (UK-APC) for Robert G.B. Renner, British Antarctic Survey (BAS) geophysicist at Stonington Island, 1963–65.
