= Australian Red Cross Lifeblood =

Blood and other human products bank in Australia

Lifeblood
- Australian Red Cross Lifeblood
- Legal status: Not-for-profit organisation
- Purpose: Collection and distribution of human medical products
- Region served: Australia
- Products: Blood; Plasma; Tissue; Organs; Milk; Microbiota
- Parent organization: Australian Red Cross
- Website: lifeblood.com.au
- Formerly called: Australian Red Cross Blood Service

Australian Red Cross Lifeblood, is the national blood, milk, and microbiota donation and manufacturing service for Australia and is a branch of the Australian Red Cross. It employs around 3,700 people across scientific, clinical and support services, processing over one and a half a million blood donations each year. The organization is primarily funded by the Australian Government and state and territory governments. Its motto is "Life is the reason", a nod to the beneficent motivations of voluntary blood donation in Australia.

== History ==
On 15 November 2019, the Australian Red Cross Blood Service changed its name and branding to Australian Red Cross Lifeblood, citing its increasing responsibility for non-blood products such as microbiota, tissue and organs and breast milk.

== Infectious diseases ==
As with other blood transfusion services, the Australian Red Cross Lifeblood has had to strike a balance between protecting blood recipients against infection, and accepting enough donors to maintain an adequate supply of blood. This has led to debate over which categories of potential donors should be excluded.

In 2003, a federal government report found that despite the introduction of hepatitis C screening from February 1990, infected donors were told to keep donating until July of that same year; a total of 20,000 people were estimated to have been infected with hepatitis C via blood products. Some infected blood was given to CSL and may have been used in thousands of CSL products, although it has not been shown that any of these products caused infection in the recipients.

The service has a policy of barring men who have had sex with men (MSM) during the previous twelve months from donating blood (an earlier policy had excluded any men who had had sex with other men since 1980, regardless of time elapsed). This has been the source of ongoing controversy, with a case (in 2008) referred to the Tasmanian Anti-Discrimination Commission. People who have engaged in heterosexual or female-to-female sex during the past 12 months are allowed to give blood. Female-to-female transmission is considered by the Centers for Disease Control to be rare. As well as deferring blood donations from MSM, other categories of sexual activity can also result in a 12-month deferral, such as sex with a prostitute or having a partner who has tested positive to hepatitis B or C.

In 2014, several gay men again requested that the Australian Red Cross Blood Service permit them to donate blood. The Red Cross, in noting their concern, said they were receptive to a reduction in the current deferral period from 12 to 6 months. However, the Australian Therapeutic Goods Administration rejected their submission, arguing that there would be a greater risk of HIV without a significant increase in blood supply. The Red Cross say they do not defer based on sexuality or relationships, but rather on sexual activity, and for this reason it is not possible to deal with MSM on an individual basis.

In April 2020, the Therapeutic Goods Administration revised the deferral period for MSM down to three months. The revision required approval of the federal, state and territory governments before it could go into effect. The revised policy came into effect on 31 January 2021.

In April 2022, the Therapeutic Goods Administration accepted the submission of Australian Red Cross Lifeblood and the University of New South Wales and removed the rule that made people who had lived in the United Kingdom for more than six months between 1980 and 1996 ineligible. Before the change came into effect in July 2022, these donors were unable to donate due to the risk of human variant Creutzfeldt–Jakob disease (vCJD, or "mad cow disease") exposure.

In June 2025, Australian Red Cross Lifeblood introduced new rules that opened up a ‘plasma pathway’ under which gay and bisexual men, and anyone taking HIV prophylaxis, can donate plasma without a wait period.

The new rules took effect on 14 July 2025. Additionally, Australian Red Cross Lifeblood announced that it was pursuing changes to blood and platelets donation with the Therapeutic Goods Administration to remove gender-based sexual activity rules. This would allow most people in a sexual relationship of 6 months or more with a single partner will be eligible to donate blood.

== See also ==
- Blood donation restrictions on men who have sex with men
- Creutzfeldt–Jakob disease
