= Lawrence E. Willey =

British geologist

Lawrence Edward Willey was a British Antarctic Survey (BAS) geologist at Fossil Bluff and Stonington Island stations, 1966–69 and 1973, and awarded the Polar Medal for services to Antarctic Survey in 1976. Willey Glacier was named after him.

He was involved in the Cape Jeremy Affair, an incident in 1968, when he and colleagues, base commander Ali McArthur, Ian Flavell-Smith, and Shaun Norman and three dog teams set out to relieve a stranded group at Fossil Bluff following an air accident in the previous field season. This incident is described in Of Ice and Men by Sir Vivian Fuchs. This has been turned into a musical piece.
