= Wooden Shoe Tulip Festival =

Tulip festival in Woodburn, Oregon, U.S.

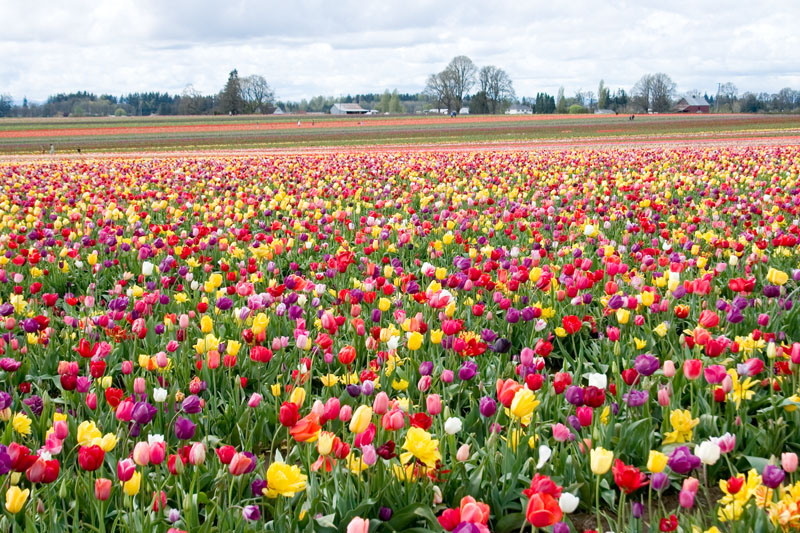
- Tulips at the 2007 festival
- Frequency: Annually
- Location: Woodburn, Oregon
- Coordinates: 45.624°N 122.590°W
- Country: United States
- Years active: 41

The Wooden Shoe Tulip Festival is a Tulip festival held in Woodburn, Oregon, United States.

== History ==
Established in 1985, the 35th annual event was held in 2019.

The 2020 festival was cancelled due to the coronavirus pandemic and a statewide restriction on large events. The 9,000 pots of flowers prepared for the festival were donated to local assisted living care centers through online donations.
