= Mount Rigel =

Mountain in Palmer Land, Antarctica

Coordinates: 70°24′S 66°52′W

Mount Rigel is the highest peak of Orion Massif, Rymill Coast, Palmer Land, Antarctica, with an elevation of 1,910 m (6,270 ft). It was mapped by the United States Geological Survey using U.S. Navy aerial photographs taken between 1966 and 1969 and named by the United Kingdom Antarctic Place-Names Committee in 1976 after the star Rigel in the constellation Orion.
