= Scorpio Peaks =

Start of the Antarctica

Scorpio Peaks (70°31′S 67°26′W) is a conspicuous massif with two high conical peaks dominating its western end and with a ridge of lower peaks extending eastward. The feature separates Meiklejohn Glacier and Millett Glacier on the west edge of Palmer Land. Named by United Kingdom Antarctic Place-Names Committee (UK-APC) after the constellation of Scorpio.
