= Bluebirds (Australian nurses) =

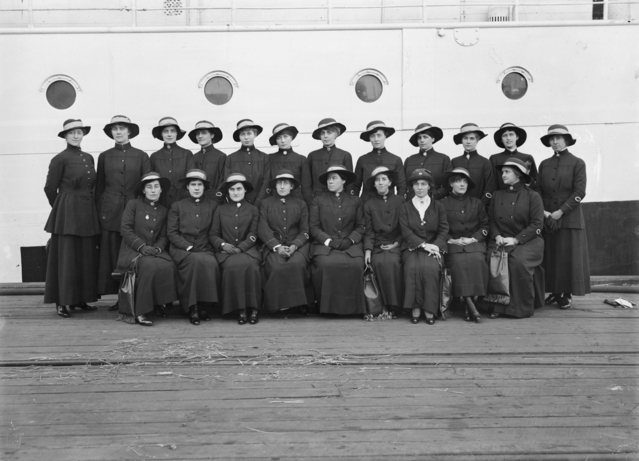
A group portrait of the "Bluebirds" and their French language teacher during the group's voyage from Sydney to Europe on board the HMAT Kanowna

The "Bluebirds" were a group of twenty Australian civilian nurses and a masseuse who volunteered for service in France during World War I. Recruited through the Australian Red Cross Society, the group's nickname referred to the colours of their specially designed uniforms. After arriving in France the nurses were split between different hospitals where they treated wounded and ill soldiers. They returned to Australia individually following the war and did not receive any medals or veterans' benefits from the Australian government.

== Selection ==
Following the outbreak of World War I, the Australian Red Cross Society contacted the French Government offering to provide a team of nurses. The French Government accepted this offer. The Red Cross subsequently placed an advertisement in the Australian press seeking medically qualified nurses who were able to speak French. A total of 90 applications were received.

Of the applicants, the Red Cross Society eventually selected 11 Sisters, nine nurses and a masseuse, among whom was Dorothy Ellena Duffy, Sister Hilda Loxton and Sister Lynette Crozier. Most of these women were aged in their late 20s or early 30s. A French teacher was also engaged to accompany the team on their voyage to Europe. The nurses signed contracts agreeing to serve for twelve months or the duration of the war, whichever was shorter. While the nurses did not form part of the military, the Department of Defence funded their passage to Europe. The Australian Jockey Club initially volunteered to pay the first six months of the Bluebirds' salaries at the same rate as those of military nurses, but may have subsequently funded the nurses' salaries for the duration of the war. The department store chain David Jones donated the nurses' distinctive uniforms, which were made from dark blue material.

== List of Bluebirds ==
Alphabetised by family name during their deployment, with known married names in parentheses:

- Elsie Cook, 1890-1972
- Nellie Weston (Barker) Crommelin, 1882-1958
- Lynette Edgell (Lloyd Jones) Crozier, 1888-1948
- Dorothy Ellena (Barton) Duffy, 1888-1973
- Alice Fullerton (Moritzson) Grey, 1879-1937
- Fanny May Harris, 1892-
- Winnifred Annie Hough, 1883-1975
- Susan Mary Hughes, 1881-1962
- Mary Catherine Hungerford, 1875-1963
- Jessie Isabella Hutchison, 1884-1963
- Annie Jamieson, 1882-1928
- Hilda Mary Loxton, 1879-1963
- Jessie Donaldson (McKillop) McKillop, 1885-1961
- Olive Hayes (Edols) Norman, 1885-1964
- Ida Jeanette (Brissenden) Reynolds-Moreton, 1883-1970
- Alice Elaine Robinson, 1882-1957
- Elizabeth Grace (Henderson) Sheridan, 1884-1968
- Lillian Fraser (Fitzhill) Thompson, 1887-
- Helen Sutherland (Wilkinson) Wallace, 1889-1959
- Elfrieda Warner, 1887-1947
- Sophie Isabel "Iza" Hamilton Moore, 1867-1941

Stories and photographs of these nurses and list of diaries and letters held at the AWM can be found in Rogers, 2017.

== Deployment ==
The Bluebirds left Sydney on board the hospital ship No. 2 Hospital Ship Kanowna on 4 July 1916, which sailed to the United Kingdom. After arriving in France the nurses were split up and worked in different hospitals. Most served in permanently established hospitals well away from the war zone where they mainly cared for French soldiers. However, several of the nurses were assigned to a mobile hospital that operated near the front lines; this hospital was bombed by a German aircraft on one occasion, and was also near the edge of a region affected by a poison gas attack on another occasion. One of the Bluebirds was appointed the matron of a hospital, and two others were placed in charge of floors of their hospitals. None of the nurses were injured as a result of military action during the war, but several suffered from periods of prolonged illness.

== Return ==
The nurses returned to Australia individually after the war. In contrast with their departure from Australia, their return voyages were not organised by the Australian Government and several of the women paid for their passage by working as nurses on board ships sailing from Europe to Australia. The Australian Government also did not provide the Bluebirds with medals or veterans benefits as they were civilian rather than military nurses. However, several received the Médaille de la Reconnaissance française from the French Government in recognition of their service.
