= Australian Red Cross =

National society of the International Red Cross and Red Crescent Movement in Australia

Australian Red Cross Society
- Formation: June 28, 1941
- Type: Non-governmental organisation
- Registration no.: 50169561394
- Legal status: Incorporated by royal charter
- Headquarters: Melbourne, Victoria
- Region served: Australia
- Services: Emergency Services and Disasters; Migration; Community Activities and Programs; International aid; International humanitarian law; Australian Red Cross Lifeblood; Social inclusion
- CEO (Secretary-General): Penny Harrison (Acting)
- President: Kate Jenkins AO
- Board Chair: Claire Rogers
- Patron: The Honourable Sam Mostyn AC, Governor-General of Australia
- Subsidiaries: Australian Red Cross Lifeblood
- Affiliations: International Red Cross and Red Crescent Movement
- Budget: A$1.110 billion (2024–25)
- Expenses: A$1.51 billion (2024–25)
- Website: redcross.org.au
- Formerly called: British Red Cross Australian Branch

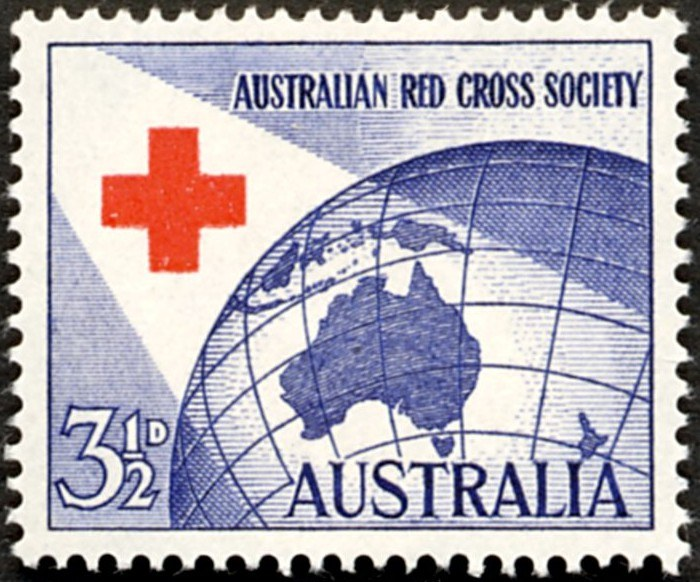
The Australian postage stamp (1954) commemorated for Australian Red Cross Society

The Australian Red Cross Society generally referred to as Australian Red Cross, is a humanitarian aid and community services charity in Australia. Tracing its history back to 1914 and being incorporated by royal charter in 1941, Australian Red Cross Society is the National Society of the Federation of Red Cross and Red Crescent Societies and part of the International Red Cross Movement. Australian Red Cross is guided by the Fundamental Principles of the International Red Cross and Red Crescent Movement and as such is a non-religious, neutral, impartial and independent humanitarian organisation.

Australian Red Cross Society is a volunteer-based organisation that exists to reduce human suffering. Australian Red Cross Society operates through two operating divisions: Australian Red Cross Humanitarian Services and Australian Red Cross Lifeblood. Its work includes the following:

- Emergency services and disasters: Australian Red Cross helps build communities that are strong, resilient and able to anticipate, respond, and recover well from disasters and climate related emergencies.
- Migration: Australian Red Cross helps build fair, welcoming, and inclusive communities where migrants are safe and have their humanitarian needs met.
- Community activities and programs: Australian Red Cross builds connection and resilience through volunteering and responding to the humanitarian needs of local communities.
- International programs: Australian Red Cross helps build stronger, more resilient international communities with increased capacity to prepare for, anticipate, respond to and recover from crises.
- International Humanitarian Law: Australian Red Cross betters humanitarian outcomes for people and communities impacted by armed conflicts.
- Australian Red Cross Lifeblood: Australian Red Cross Lifeblood increases the supply of safe and high-quality blood, plasma and other biological products, bolstering the capacity to respond to emergencies, support medical treatments, and improve patient and community outcomes.
- First Nations Centrality: Australian Red Cross' work is informed by the voices of First Nations people, so that it may work together in the purpose of Australian Red Cross, while fostering cultural safety, equity and greater inclusion of First Nations people in its programs, volunteering and as voices of advocacy.

The National Council is the main representative body for Australian Red Cross Society’s Members and is composed of the President, up to six special councillors, and 24 members of Division Councils.

== History ==
A branch of British Red Cross was established in Australia in 1914, nine days after the start of World War I, by Lady Helen Munro Ferguson.

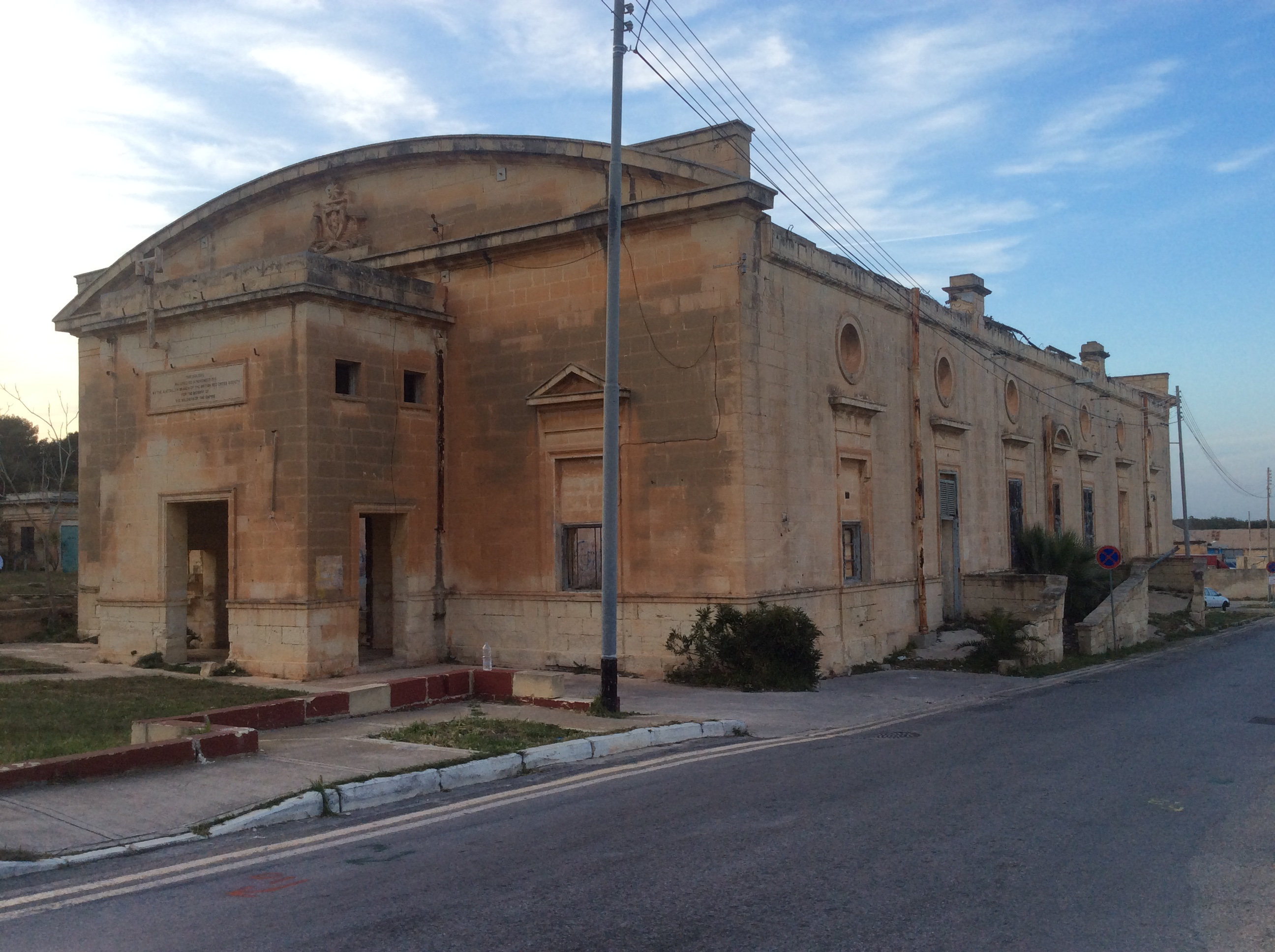
Australia Hall in Pembroke, Malta, which was built in 1915 by the Australian Branch of British Red Cross Society as an entertainment hall for soldiers from the British Empire

The organisation grew at a rapid rate. Lady Helen wrote to the mayors of every shire and municipality in Australia asking them to initiate a local branch. Typically, a letter was published in the local newspaper and a meeting called. By November 1914, New South Wales had 88 city or suburban branches and 249 country branches, all established within the previous four months. The Society was accepted by the community from the beginning. Much of the World War I home front activities such as knitting socks and rolling bandages were done by local Red Cross branches. The Red Cross Information Bureau was established in 1915 in order to coordinate information gathered on the dead and their burial beyond what was provided by the armed forces. The Red Cross Wounded and Missing files were extensive with searchers sometimes sent overseas to clarify information, make better judgements and resolve conflicting accounts. In 1916 Australian Red Cross Society sent a team of 21 civilian nurses to France; these nurses were dubbed the "Bluebirds" in reference to the colours of their specially designed uniforms.

From the establishment of the Repatriation Commission Outpatient Clinic at 310 St Kilda Rd, Southbank, in 1937, Red Cross maintained the canteen staffed by up to 25 volunteers. The canteen provided tea, coffee, biscuits and company for between 200 and 250 veterans each day waiting their appointments.

In 1939 there were bushfires, and in addition another world war seemed very likely. Lilian Avis Scantlebury assisted the organisation's development so it could deal with emergencies, whether of natural or man-made causes. Scantlebury became a vice-president during World War II. The Red Cross provided assistance to the sick, wounded, and maimed and their dependants. By agreement with the federal government they provided hostel accommodation to those with no living relatives or friends to support them upon returning home from war. At the time the majority of the volunteers were unemployed married women. High rates of membership in the organisation were attributed to their annual national recruitment drive.

The British Red Cross Australian Branch changed its name to Australian Red Cross Society and was incorporated by royal charter on 28 June 1941. Membership grew from 260,000 in 1941 to 450,000 in 1944. Australian Red Cross proved to be an important link between the public and Japanese prisoners of war.

In 2005, the organisation made an agreement with the Maldives Government to help clear debris created by the 2004 Indian Ocean earthquake and tsunami. In December 2010, aid workers from Australian Red Cross were sent to Christmas Island to assist the survivors of the 2010 Christmas Island boat disaster. Australian Red Cross volunteers were also active after Cyclone Tracy hit Darwin, the Ash Wednesday bushfires, the Black Saturday bushfires and the 2010–11 Queensland floods.

In 2013, Australian Red Cross was a recipient of the Queensland Greats Awards.

== Volunteers ==
All Australian Red Cross programs are primarily run, organised, and managed by volunteers with oversight from Red Cross employees. Volunteers are organised into three different groups, responding to different needs:

- community volunteering – support for homelessness, mental health, migration, youth, family, elderly, Aboriginal and Torres Strait Islander peoples, and people in the justice system support.
- emergency services – urgent-response programs, such as psychological first aid for those in evacuation centres, door-to-door support following a flood or bushfire, or registering missing persons after disasters on their Register.Find.Reunite platform.
- retail, customer service, and administration – volunteering at Australian Red Cross Shops (which help fund services), the Melbourne Supporter Services Centre, or in organisational positions like human resources, finance, or legal.

Red Cross statistics show that 2.5 million people have, in some form, volunteered with Australian Red Cross since its inception.

== Priorities ==
The eight priority areas of Red Cross are:

- Strengthening national emergency preparedness, response and recovery
- Increasing international aid and development
- Strengthening communities in areas of locational disadvantage
- Championing international humanitarian law ("the laws of war")
- Addressing the impact of migration
- Partnering with Aboriginal and Torres Strait Islander peoples
- Overcoming social exclusion by providing bridges back into the community
- Provide a safe, secure supply of blood and blood products – through Australian Red Cross Lifeblood

== Recognition ==
In 2017, Australian Red Cross was the recipient of the UN Day Honour award, which recognise "individuals or organisations in Australia that have made a significant contribution to the aims and objectives of the UN, for example in promoting peace, respect for human rights, equal opportunities, social justice and environmental sustainability".

== See also ==
- Lucy Meredith Bryce, haematologist, founding director 1929–1954
- Charles Challice, general secretary of the NSW Division of the Australian Red Cross 1949-1958
- Alice Creswick, principal commandant 1940–1946
- Red Cross House, Sydney
