= Moore Point =

Moore Point (70°30′S 67°53′W) is a rocky point surmounted by a small peak, fronting on George VI Sound and marking the north side of the mouth of Meiklejohn Glacier, on the west coast of Palmer Land, Antarctica. It was first surveyed in 1936 by the British Graham Land Expedition under John Rymill, and was named by the UK Antarctic Place-Names Committee in 1954 after James I. Moore, second engineer of the Penola during Rymill's expedition.
