= Naess Glacier =

Glacier in Antarctica

Coordinates: 70°22′S 67°55′W

Naess Glacier is a small glacier, which is separated from Chapman Glacier to the north by a rocky ridge, flowing from the west coast of Palmer Land into George VI Sound. First surveyed in 1936 by the British Graham Land Expedition (BGLE) under Rymill. Named by the United Kingdom Antarctic Place-Names Committee (UK-APC) in 1954 for Erling D. Naess, Mgr. of the Vestfold Whaling Co., who was of great assistance to the BGLE, 1934–37.

== See also ==
- Renner Peak, the dominant peak between Chapman and Naess Glaciers
