= Alice Creswick =

Alice Ishbel Hay Creswick DStJ OBE (née Reid; 21 September 1889, Aberdeen, Scotland – 24 October 1973, Armadale, Victoria, Australia) is best known for her work in the Free Kindergarten Union (FKU) and as an important figure in the Australian Red Cross Society (ARCS) during World War II.

She was president of the committee of the Lady Northcote Free Kindergarten for ten years (1928–1938) and joined the executive of the Free Kindergarten Union (FKU), becoming president in 1939. In 1940, she was 'headhunted' by the Australian Red Cross Society, when they asked her to become its principal commandant. In this capacity, she travelled widely, both inspecting and establishing Red Cross services and activities.

She resigned from this position in 1946 and immediately resumed her presidency of the FKU, picking up where she left off as an energetic leader who tirelessly lobbied the government for greater support for pre-school training. Ill health forced her to resign in 1949, but she maintained her interest and activism in the area of early childhood development.

She died in 1973, aged 84, leaving large bequests to the organisations she supported in her lifetime: the FKU, the Australian Red Cross and the Anglican Church.
