= Creswick Peaks =

Group of mountains in Antarctica

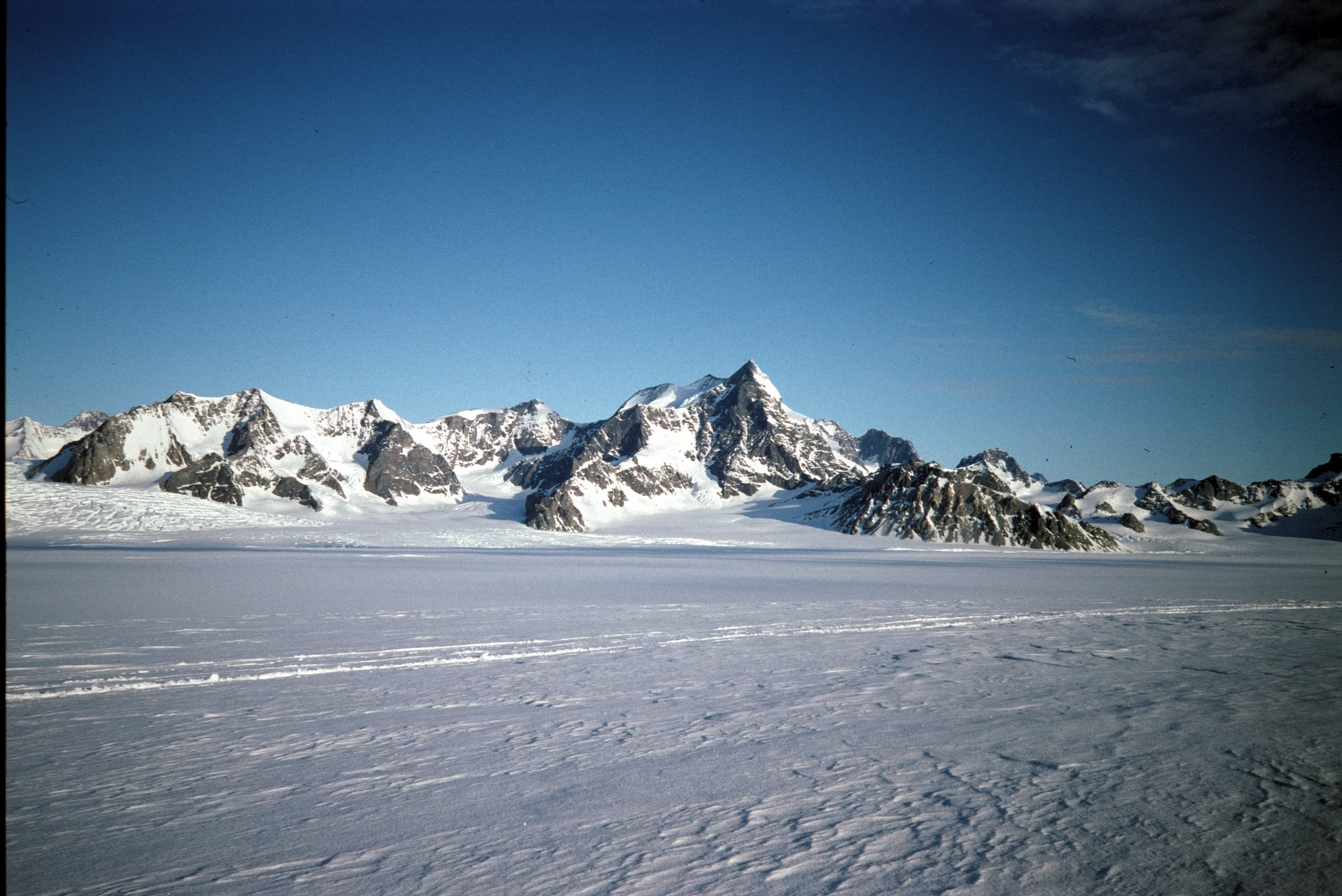
Creswick Peaks seen from George VI Sound

The Creswick Peaks (70°28′S 67°43′W), in Antarctica, form an impressive mountain massif with several peaks, the highest at 1,465 metres (4,800 ft), standing at the northeast side of Moore Point between Naess Glacier and Meiklejohn Glacier, and 3 nautical miles (6 km) inland from George VI Sound on the west coast of Palmer Land.

They were first surveyed in 1936 by the British Graham Land Expedition (BGLE) under John Rymill. They were named by the UK Antarctic Place-Names Committee in 1954 after Frances E. Creswick (who married James I. Moore, after whom Moore Point was named), Assistant to the Director of the Scott Polar Research Institute, Cambridge, 1931–38, who helped to organize the BGLE, 1934–37.
