= Chapman Glacier (Palmer Land) =

Glacier in Antarctica

Chapman Glacier (70°17′S 67°55′W) is a glacier 11 miles (18 km) long and 10 miles (16 km) wide in its central part, narrowing to 3 miles (5 km) at its mouth, flowing west from the Dyer Plateau of Palmer Land to George VI Sound immediately south of Carse Point. It was first surveyed in 1936 by the British Graham Land Expedition (BGLE) under John Rymill, and named by the UK Antarctic Place-names Committee in 1954 for Frederick S. Chapman, British mountaineer and Arctic explorer, who in 1934 brought 64 dogs from West Greenland to England for the use of the BGLE, 1934–37.

== See also ==
- Renner Peak, the dominant peak between Chapman and Naess Glaciers
