= Meiklejohn Glacier =

Glacier in Antarctica

Meiklejohn Glacier (/ˈmiːkəlˌdʒɒn/) (70°33′S 67°44′W) is a glacier, 12 nautical miles (22 km) long and 4 nautical miles (7 km) wide, flowing southwest from the Dyer Plateau of Palmer Land, Antarctica, to George VI Sound, immediately south of Moore Point. In its lower reaches the south side of this glacier merges with Millett Glacier. It was first surveyed in 1936 by the British Graham Land Expedition (BGLE) under John Rymill, and was named by the UK Antarctic Place-Names Committee in 1954 for Ian F. Meiklejohn, a radio operator of the BGLE.
