= Sally Poncet =

Australian-born scientist and adventurer

- Born: Sally Brothers; 1954 (age 71–72); Hobart, Tasmania, Australia
- Occupations: polar explorer, Antarctic biologist and ornithologist
- Years active: 1977-present
- Awards: Blue Water Medal (1992); Fuchs Medal (2010); Polar Medal (2015)

Sally Poncet (born 1954) is an Australian-born scientist and adventurer who has explored and studied the Antarctic region since 1977. Her specialty is birds and she made extensive studies of albatross and their habitats for the British Antarctic Survey. She has written guidebooks on preservation of the flora and fauna of South Georgia and received numerous awards and honors, including the Blue Water Medal, the Fuchs Medal and the Polar Medal for her contributions to understanding the southern polar region.

== Early life ==
Sally Brothers was born in 1954 to a dentist and grew up in Hobart, Tasmania, Australia. Brothers attended Fahan School, graduating in 1970 and then enrolled at the University of Tasmania to further her studies. In 1973 she met Jerome Poncet, a Frenchman, who was sailing aboard the Damien I circumnavigating the globe. She completed her degree in botany and zoology and then joined Poncet in France, where they were married in 1974. The couple made plans to sail on Damien II through the Southern Ocean and set sail in 1976 aboard the 50-foot steel schooner for Antarctica.

== Career ==
Arriving in 1977, the couple prepared to do a series of population censuses of the wildlife. In 1978, they spent the winter in Marguerite Bay on the Antarctic Peninsula, where Poncet began a survey of the seabirds of the area and a count of elephant seals. The following year, Poncet gave birth to her first son, Dion on South Georgia Island. Their boat had become trapped in the ice and they were forced to wait until a British Research ship, the R R S Bransfield, was able to release their schooner. The couple sailed back to Tasmania for repairs, where their second son, Leiv was born in 1981. The following year, they returned to the Antarctic for the 1982-1983 bird season count and settled in the Falkland Islands. Their son Lars Nigel, nicknamed Diti, was born in the Falkland Islands in 1984. Throughout the 1980s, Poncet worked in conjunction with the British Antarctic Survey (BAS) mapping locations of colonies around South Georgia and the Willis Islands of elephant seals, macaroni penguins and mollymawks.

In 1987, couple leased a sheep farm in the Falkland Islands and continued to spend up to four summer months each year sailing and studying the wildlife in South Georgia. Poncet spent a decade surveying the birdlife of the region for the BAS. In 1989, the couple were featured in National Geographic (March, 1989) and in 1990, National Geographic Explorer presented a documentary "Antarctic Adventure", recounting the Poncets' journey to Antarctica and their explorations of the southern polar region. Throughout the 1990s, Poncet continued her collaboration with the BAS, performing vegetation baseline studies. Damien Bay was named after she and Jerome's boat, which had been chartered by the BAS for research.

In 2001, concern about damage by tourists to the Cape Royds and Cape Evans areas in which Ernest Shackleton and Robert Falcon Scott had established expedition bases caused the Government of South Georgia & the South Sandwich Islands (GSGSSI) to hire Poncet to prepare an environmental assessment of the region to establish an environmental baseline. In 2002, Poncet began trials on a rat eradication project in an effort to restore the South Georgia pipit population. The brown rat population, originally arriving on the island aboard ships in the 19th century, had caused extreme losses in the petrel, pipit and prion bird colonies. It was the first such trial in South Georgia and a similar project on the Falklands led Poncet in 2011 to the discovery of a new breeding ground of southern giant petrel in the Choiseul Sound. By 2015, the South Georgia Heritage Trust project had cleared the island of rodents, with Poncet reporting the first pipit nest in Schlieper Bay of the eradication target area. The nest was found near Weddell Point during one of Poncet's expeditions tracking albatross. Since her report, numerous other nest sightings have occurred.

Poncet co-authored with Kim Crosbie two editions of the South Georgia Visitor’s Guide. She has also worked with the GSGSSI as an advisor on reindeer eradication, using humane methods to relocate the invasive species which has caused damage to vegetation. In 2005, Poncet led the Petrel and Prion Survey team in work on a census of the wandering albatross. The count was triggered by concerns over the catastrophic death of the birds because of longline fishing. Between 2005 and 2007, Poncet led a similar count of the giant petrel and white-chinned petrel colonies. As the GSGSSI is committed to performing a survey on the wandering albatross every ten years, Poncet partnered with Cheesemans’ Ecology Safaris in a public-private partnership in 2015 to offset costs of the census. Poncet led the scientific research conducted during the expedition.

== Awards and honours ==
In 1992, Poncet and her husband were awarded the Blue Water Medal for their years of cruising in the Antarctic and publication of a guidebook focused on preservation of the region. In 1995, she received the Gerdy Jevtic alumni medal from Fahan School. Poncet was awarded the Fuchs Medal from the British Antarctic Survey in 2010 for her wildlife and vegetation mapping and conservation management strategies of the southern polar region. In 2015, she was awarded the Polar Medal for her research and efforts at protecting the biodiversity of South Georgia and the Antarctic.
