= Fahan School =

- Fahan School crest

Location
- Sandy Bay, Tasmania; Australia
- Coordinates: 42°54′52″S 147°21′6″E

Information
- Type: Independent, single-sex school and day
- Denomination: Non-denominational Christian
- Established: 1935
- Chair: Lia Morris
- Principal: Meg Lawson
- Enrolment: ~430 (Pre-K–Year 12)
- Colours: Orange, white and blue
- Affiliation: Sports Association of Tasmanian Independent Schools
- Website: www.fahan.tas.edu.au

Fahan School is an independent school for girls located in Sandy Bay, a suburb of Hobart, Tasmania, Australia. It is a non-denominational school with a Christian ethos.

The School was established in 1935 by Isobel Travers and Audrey Morphett. The School was named after the village of Fahan (pronounced 'Fawn') in Inishowen in County Donegal in Ulster, Ireland. The School has a non-selective enrolment policy and currently caters for approximately 430 students from Pre–Kindergarten (PK) to Year 12,

Fahan School is a member of the Junior School Heads Association of Australia (JSHAA), the Association of Heads of Independent Schools of Australia (AHISA), and the Association of Independent Schools' of Tasmania (AIST).

== Campus ==
Fahan School is located on a single campus with grounds overlooking the River Derwent, in the suburb of Sandy Bay.

== Co-curriculum ==
The Fahan School has a number of sister schools around the world, Fintona (Australia), Aoyamagakuin Yokohama Eiwa (Japan), Joggakan (Tokyo) and St Mary's (South Africa). The school works closely with The Hutchins School in Sandy Bay, Tasmania – with senior students able to study across both campuses.

=== Sport ===
The Fahan School is a member of the Sports Association of Tasmanian Independent Schools (SATIS). Each year Fahan fields teams in a variety of sports. Students may compete for their House and School in sports such as: athletics, badminton, basketball, cross country, equestrian, hockey, netball, rowing, sailing, soccer, softball, tennis, and water polo.

==== SATIS premierships ====
The Fahan School has won the following SATIS premierships.

- Athletics (3) – 1983, 1986, 2017
- Cross Country – 2010
- Hockey (2) – 1986, 1988
- Soccer – 2016
- Softball (2) – 1983, 2003
- Tennis – 1993

== House system ==
The Fahan School has three house systems; Fenton, Franklin or Freycinet. The houses form the basis of the pastoral care program in the Senior School, and also support competition across all sections of the school. Students compete for trophies in a variety of sports as well as academic application.

== Notable alumnae ==
The Fahan School alumnae are active within the school community through the Fahan School Alumni Association (FSAA), formerly known as the Old Scholars Association. Some notable alumnae include:

Academia and sciences

- Margaret M. Davies – herpetologist
- Ann Hollingworth – physiotherapist and wife of Peter Hollingworth, 23rd Governor-General of Australia
- Sally Poncet – Antarctic scientist and adventurer, winner of the Polar Medal

Business

- Deborah Tabart OAM – chief executive officer of the Australian Koala Foundation

Entertainment, media and the arts

- Judith Mavis Durham AO – actress, singer, composer, pianist and author, former lead singer for the popular folk music group The Seekers and Australian of the Year (1967)
- Posie Graeme-Evans – novelist, producer, television director and co-creator of Hi-5 and McLeod's Daughters.
- Zehra Naqvi – actress
- Robyn Nevin AM – actress and former Artistic Director of the Sydney Theatre Company
- Rachael Treasure – journalist and author

Government, politics and the law

- Elise Archer – Liberal politician, lawyer and Attorney-General of Tasmania
- Olivia McTaggart – Tasmanian magistrate and coroner

== See also ==
- List of schools in Tasmania
- List of boarding schools
