= Honnywill =

Honnywill may refer to:

- Dora Honnywill (1870–1959), British archer
- Eleanor Honnywill (1919/1920–2003), British writer and Antarctic survey administrator
- Honnywill Peak, mountain in Antarctica named for Eleanor

== See also ==
- Honeywell (disambiguation)
- Honeywill
