= Janet Thomson =

British geologist

- Born: 1942 (age 83–84)
- Education: University of London
- Awards: Fuchs Medal (2001); Polar Medal (2003)
- Scientific career
- Fields: Geology
- Workplaces: British Antarctic Survey

Janet Thomson also known as Janet Wendy Thomson (born 1942) is a British geologist and the first British woman scientist to complete field research in Antarctica. Thomson Summit and Thomson Glacier are named in her honor. She was a 2001 recipient of the British Antarctic Survey's Fuchs Medal, and in 2003, she was the recipient of the Polar Medal.

== Biography ==
Janet Wendy Thomson was born in 1942 in Staffordshire, England. She attended Bedford College and later the University of London.

Thomson began working for the British Antarctic Survey (BAS) in 1964, but was barred from participating in actual trips to Antarctica because policy forbade women, because of the hardship it would impose. For eighteen years, Thomson pressed to have the restriction lifted. Not making headway with the British team, Thomson joined an American expedition in 1976, becoming the first British woman to conduct fieldwork in the Antarctic.

In 1983, Thomson became the first British woman scientist working inside the Antarctic Circle on a British team, when the BAS finally lifted their gender barrier. Peter D. Rowley who led the United States Antarctic Research Program geological survey during the 1984 to 1985 season, suggested that Thomson Summit, a peak in the Behrendt Mountains of Palmer Land, be named in Thomson's honor in 1986. Thomson Glacier, is also named for her. Thomson served as head of the Mapping and Geographical Information Center (MAGIC) prior to her 2003 retirement. She then worked on a topographic map of Antarctica with the Committee on Antarctic Research Digital Topographic Database. In 2003, she was awarded the Polar Medal for her outstanding service to polar research. Thomson and other noted British scientists were interviewed in an oral history project for the British Library in 2013.
