= Honeywill =

Honeywill is a surname. Notable people with the surname include:

- Greer Honeywill (born 1945), Australian artist
- Ross Honeywill (born 1949), Australian philosopher

== See also ==
- Honeywill and Stein Ltd v Larkin Brothers Ltd, 1934 English law case
- Honnywill (disambiguation)
- Honeywell (disambiguation)
