= Williams Ridge =

Williams Ridge (80°30′S 29°20′W) is a conspicuous rock ridge, 1,060 m, extending east–west between Blaiklock and Stratton Glaciers, 1 nautical mile (1.9 km) northwest of Honnywill Peak in the west part of the Shackleton Range. First mapped in 1957 by the Commonwealth Trans-Antarctic Expedition and named for Sgt. Ellis Williams, RAF, radio operator with the advance party of the Commonwealth Trans-Antarctic Expedition in 1955–56 and with the RAF contingent of the expedition in 1956–58.
