= Church Bay =

Church Bay may refer to:

- Church Bay, Anglesey, a settlement in Wales
- Church Bay, Bermuda, a snorkelling beach
- Church Bay, South Georgia, a bay in the southern Atlantic Ocean
- Church Bay, Northern Ireland, the main port of Rathlin Island
- Church Bay, New Zealand a settlement near Lyttelton in the South Island of New Zealand
