= Binnie Peaks =

Binnie Peaks (54°3′S 37°52′W) are twin peaks rising to 430 metres (1,410 ft) to the north of Romerof Head in western South Georgia. Named by the UK Antarctic Place-Names Committee after Edward Beveridge Binnie, second British resident magistrate, South Georgia, 1915–26, succeeding James Innes Wilson.
