= Steven Wormald =

Steven Wormald, born 1946, was prominent as an Antarctic explorer during the 1970s.

Wormald, who was described in 1973 as a resident of Calgary, Alberta, was the British Antarctic Survey (BAS) meteorological observer at Adelaide Station, on Adelaide Island in 1969–70 and the BAS general assistant at Stonington Island in 1970–71. Wormald was later involved in survey work in the Canadian Arctic, before returning to BAS, as base commander at Stonington Island in 1973. He served as field operations manager for BAS at Rothera Research Station, in 1974–1977.

In 1976, Wormald was awarded the Fuchs Medal, which is awarded by the BAS for "outstanding devotion to the British Antarctic Survey's interests, beyond the call of normal duty, by men or women who are or were members of the Survey, or closely connected with its work." In 1978, Wormald received the Polar Medal, which is awarded by the British government "for outstanding services as members of the British Antarctic Survey".

The Wormald Ice Piedmont, a peak on Adelaide Island, was subsequently named after him.
