= Pratts Peak =

Rock peak in Antarctica

- Location within Antarctica

Highest point
- Coordinates: 80°24′S 29°21′W

Geography
- Location: Antarctica
- Parent range: Shackleton Range

Pratts Peak is a rock peak in Antarctica located 11 kilometres (6.8 miles) east of Mount Provender in the west part of Shackleton Range. It was first mapped in 1957 by the CTAE and it was photographed in 1967 by U.S. Navy trimetrogon aerial photography. It was named by the United Kingdom Antarctic Place-Names Committee (UK-APC) for David L. Pratt, engineer, and John G. D. Pratt, geophysicist, who were with the transpolar party of the Commonwealth Trans-Antarctic Expedition in 1956–58.
