= Kim Crosby =

Kim Crosby may refer to:

- Kim Crosby (racing driver) (born 1964), American stock car racing driver
- Kim Crosby (singer) (born 1960), American singer and musical theatre actress

== See also ==
- Kim Crosbie, British Antarctic scientist
