= Honnywill Peak =

Mountain in Antarctica

Honnywill Peak (80°31′S 29°8′W) is a rock peak, 1,220 metres (4,000 ft) high, immediately southeast of Williams Ridge on the west side of Stratton Glacier in the Shackleton Range of Antarctica. It was first mapped in 1957 by the Commonwealth Trans-Antarctic Expedition and was named for Eleanor Honnywill, Assistant Secretary to the expedition in 1955–59, and later Secretary and Editor.
