= Wedge Ridge =

Rock ridge in Antarctica

Wedge Ridge (80°38′S 29°12′W) is a conspicuous rock ridge, 1,145 m, near the head of Blaiklock Glacier and immediately west of Pointer Nunatak in the west part of the Shackleton Range. First mapped in 1957 by the CTAE. The name given by the United Kingdom Antarctic Place-Names Committee (UK-APC) is descriptive of the shape of the feature.
