= Mount Skidmore =

Mountain in Antarctica

Mount Skidmore (80°18′S 28°56′W) is a mountain (865 m) on the east side of the mouth of Stratton Glacier in the Shackleton Range. It was first mapped in 1957 by the CTAE, and it was photographed in 1967 by U.S. Navy trimetrogon aerial photography. It was named by the United Kingdom Antarctic Place-Names Committee (UK-APC) for Michael J. Skidmore, a British Antarctic Survey (BAS) geologist at the Brunt Ice Shelf between 1966 and 1969 who worked in the Shackleton Range from 1968 to 1969.
