= Melody Clark =

Melody Susan Clark is a British molecular biologist and polar scientist at the British Antarctic Survey (BAS). Her research uses genetics and environmental genomics to study how Antarctic marine organisms have adapted to extreme cold and how they respond to environmental change, including climate change.

Clark joined the British Antarctic Survey in 2003. Her Antarctic research has included molecular studies of marine invertebrates and their responses to changing environmental conditions.

In 2022, Clark was awarded the Polar Medal for outstanding achievement and service to the United Kingdom in the field of polar research. The award recognised her work as a molecular scientist in the Antarctic and Arctic.
