= Damien Bay =

Bay in South Georgia

Damien Bay (54°48′S 35°53′W) is located north-northeast of Hamilton Bay on the southeast coast of South Georgia. It was named after the yacht Damien II, owned by Sally and Jerome Poncet, residents of Beaver Island in the Falkland Islands. The Poncets conducted investigations of the breeding colonies of seals and seabirds around the coastline of South Georgia. The Damien II was chartered by the British Antarctic Survey for various wildlife surveys between 1985 and 1992.
