= Lister Heights =

Rock formation in Antarctica

The Lister Heights (80°31′S 28°35′W) are rock heights on the east side of Stratton Glacier, 4 nautical miles (7 km) southwest of Flat Top in the western part of the Shackleton Range, Antarctica. They were first mapped in 1957 by the Commonwealth Trans-Antarctic Expedition (CTAE) and named for Hal Lister, a glaciologist with the transpolar party of the CTAE in 1956–58, and leader at the expedition's advance base, South Ice, in 1957.
