= Vivian Fuchs =

British polar explorer (1908–1999)

Sir Vivian Fuchs FRS
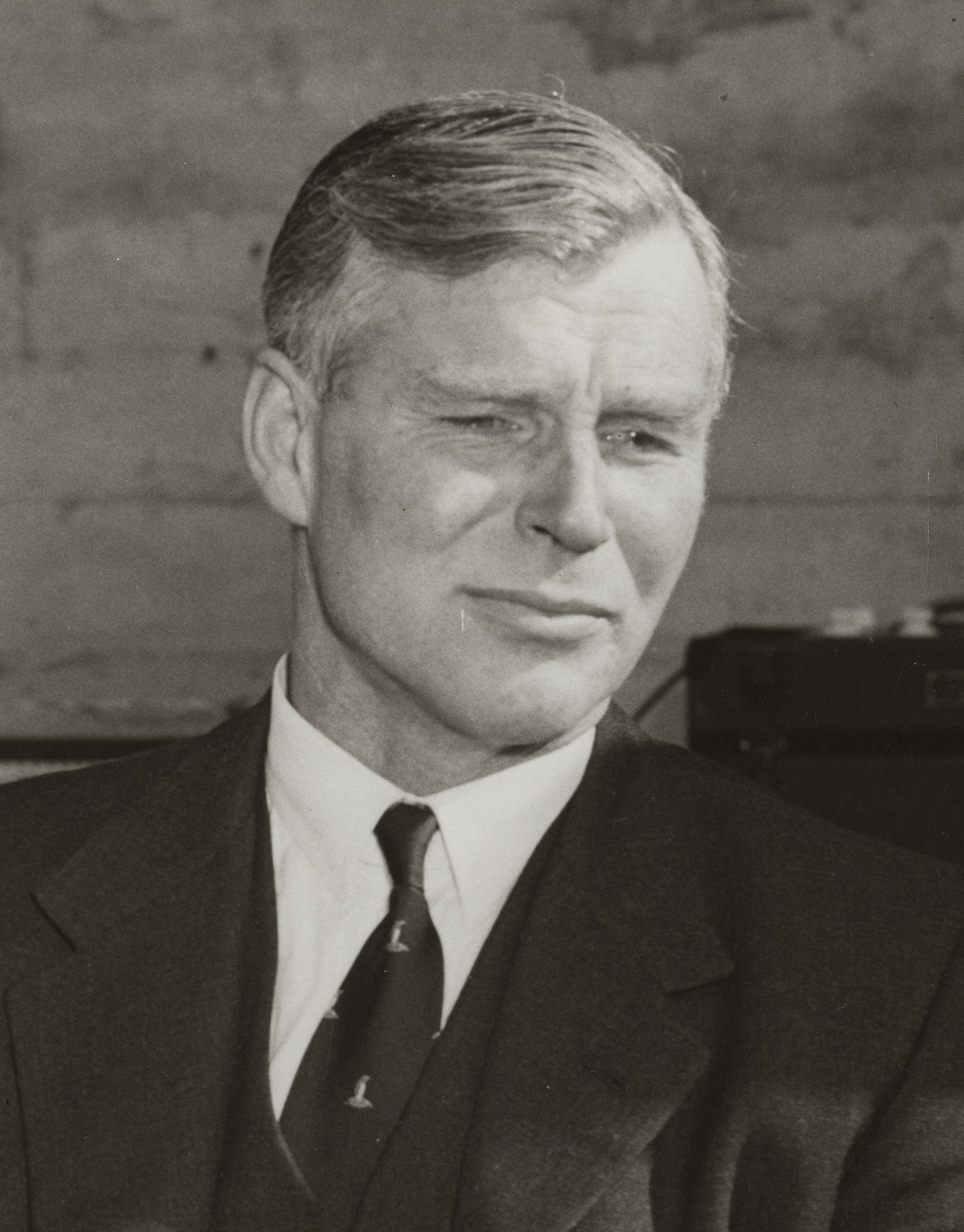
- Sir Vivian Fuchs in Wellington, 1958.
- Born: Vivian Ernest Fuchs; 11 February 1908; Freshwater, Isle of Wight, England
- Died: 11 November 1999 (aged 91); Cambridge, Cambridgeshire, England
- Education: Brighton College; St John's College, Cambridge
- Spouses: Joyce Connell (m. 1933; died 1990); Eleanor Honnywill (m. 1991)
- Children: 3

Sir Vivian Ernest Fuchs FRS (/fʊks/ FUUKS; 11 February 1908 – 11 November 1999) was an English scientist-explorer and expedition organizer. He led the Commonwealth Trans-Antarctic Expedition which reached the South Pole overland in 1958.

== Biography ==
Fuchs was the son of the German immigrant Ernst Fuchs from the Jena area and of his British wife Violet Watson. He was born in 1908 in Freshwater, Isle of Wight, and attended Brighton College and St John's College, Cambridge. He was educated as a geologist, and considered the profession a means of pursuing his interest in the outdoors. He was a member of the Sedgwick Club, a geological society, at Cambridge. His first expedition was to Greenland in 1929 with his tutor James Wordie. After graduation in 1930, he travelled with a Cambridge University expedition to study the geology of East African lakes with respect to climate fluctuation. Next, he joined anthropologist Louis Leakey on an expedition to Olduvai Gorge. In 1933, Fuchs married his cousin, Joyce Connell. A world traveller in her own right, Joyce accompanied Vivian on his expedition to Lake Rudolf (now Lake Turkana) in 1934. The findings from this expedition, in which two of their companions were lost, were summarised by Fuchs in his Cambridge University PhD, which was awarded 1937.

In February 1936, his daughter Hilary was born. Fuchs organised an expedition to investigate the Lake Rukwa basin in southern Tanzania in 1937. He returned in 1938 to find that his second daughter, Rosalind, had severe cerebral palsy. Rosalind died in 1945. His son, Peter, was born in 1940.

At the age of thirty, he enrolled in the Territorial Army, and was dispatched to the Gold Coast from 1942 to July 1943. He returned home and was posted to London at Second Army headquarters in a civil affairs position. The Second Army was transferred to Portsmouth for the D-Day landings, and Fuchs eventually reached Germany in time to see the release of prisoners from the Belsen concentration camp. He governed the Plön district in Schleswig-Holstein until October 1946, when he was discharged from military service with the rank of Major.

Fuchs was involved with the Falkland Islands Dependencies Survey (now the British Antarctic Survey) beginning in 1947, when he applied for a geologist position. The institute's goal was to promote Britain's claims to Antarctica, and secondarily to support scientific research. In 1950 Fuchs was asked to develop the new London scientific bureau of the Survey, to plan research in the Antarctic and support research publication. After the trans-Antarctic expedition he become director of the Survey, a position he held until 1973.

From 1982 through 1984, Fuchs was president of the Royal Geographical Society. He became a Fellow of the Royal Society in 1974.

== Family ==
In 1933, he married Joyce Connell, and for their honeymoon traveled together to East Africa. They had three children, two daughters (one of whom predeceased him) and a son. Joyce, Lady Fuchs, died in 1990.

The next year, in 1991, he married Eleanor Honnywill, his former personal assistant at the British Antarctic Survey, in Kensington and Chelsea, London.

== Death ==
Sir Vivian Fuchs died in Cambridge on 11 November 1999, aged 91.

== The Commonwealth Trans-Antarctic Expedition ==
Fuchs is best known as the leader of the Commonwealth Trans-Antarctic Expedition, a Commonwealth-sponsored expedition that completed the first overland crossing of Antarctica. Planning for the expedition began in 1953, and envisioned the use of Sno-Cat tractors to cross the continent in 100 days, starting at the Weddell Sea, ending at the Ross Sea, and crossing the South Pole.

Fuchs and his party arrived in Antarctica in January 1957 after camp had been set up. The party departed from Shackleton Base on 24 November 1957. During the trek, a variety of scientific data were collected from seismic soundings and gravimetric readings. Scientists established the thickness of ice at the pole, and the existence of a land mass beneath the ice. On 2 March 1958, Fuchs and company completed the 100-day trip by reaching Scott Base, having travelled 2,158 miles.

In 1958, he was knighted by Queen Elizabeth II. He co-wrote, with Sir Edmund Hillary, The Crossing of Antarctica. In 1959 he was awarded the Hans Egede Medal by the Royal Danish Geographical Society.

== Legacy ==
- The Fuchs Medal was created in 1973 for "outstanding devotion to the British Antarctic Survey's interests, beyond the call of normal duty, by men or women who are or were members of the Survey, or closely connected with its work." It is awarded to one or two people per year.
- Fuchs Dome in the Shackleton Range, Antarctica.
- Fuchs Ice Piedmont on Adelaide Island, Antarctica.
