= Fuchs Medal =

The Fuchs Medal is a medal awarded by The British Antarctic Survey for "Outstanding devotion to the British Antarctic Survey's interests, beyond the call of normal duty, by men or women who are or were members of the Survey, or closely connected with its work."

== Creation ==
The award was created in 1973 and is named after the polar explorer Sir Vivian Fuchs, who was the director of BAS from 1958 to 1973.

== Recipients ==
Source: British Antarctic Survey Club

- 1973 - Sir Vivian Fuchs
- 1974 - David Rowley
- 1975 - Eleanor Honnywill and Edward Clapp
- 1976 - Alan MacManus
- 1977 - Steven Wormald
- 1978 - Terry Pye
- 1979 - Kenn Back
- 1980 - David Fletcher
- 1981 - Jack Scotcher
- 1982 - Doug Allan and Geoff Renner
- 1983 - Al Smith
- 1984 - Alan Etchells
- 1985 - Ray Adie and Tony Escott
- 1986 - David Rootes and Sterling Aldridge
- 1987 - Anne Todd
- 1988 - Bob Bowler
- 1989 - Myriam Booth
- 1990 - Derek Gripps
- 1991 - Steve Eadie
- 1992 - John Bawden
- 1993 - Allan Wearden
- 1994 - Richard Hanson
- 1995 - Matthew Chalmers
- 1996 - Ben Hodges
- 1997 - Simon Wright
- 1998 - Nigel Milius
- 1999 - David Burkitt and Ashley ("Ash") Morton
- 2000 - George Kistruck
- 2001 - Janet Thomson and Alexandra Gaffikin
- 2002 - Russ Ladkin
- 2003 - Stuart Lawrence
- 2004 - Chris Elliott
- 2005 - Doug Bone and Andy Silvester
- 2006 - John Hall
- 2007 - Gerry Nicholson and Sally Poncet
- 2008 - Clem Collins
- 2009 - Robert Kelso Smith
- 2010 - Steven Parker
- 2011 - Kath Nicholson
- 2012 - Not awarded
- 2013 - George Lemann
- 2014 - Crispin Day
- 2015 - Chris Hindley
- 2016 - David Williams
- 2017 - James Miller
- 2018 - Mike Dinn
- 2019 - Steve Bremner and Pete Marquis
- 2020 - Jim Scott
- 2021 - Julie Leland and Sandra McInnes
- 2022 — Kirsten “K” Shaw
- 2023 - Alison Hunt and James (Bob) Middleton
- 2024 - Julia Webb

== See also ==
- List of geography awards
