= Pointer Nunatak =

Nunatak in Coats Land, Antarctica

Pointer Nunatak (80°37′S 29°0′W) is a conspicuous nunatak, 1,245 m, immediately east of Wedge Ridge in the west part of the Shackleton Range. First mapped in 1957 by the Commonwealth Trans-Antarctic Expedition and so named because it is an important landmark on the route from Blaiklock Glacier to Stratton Glacier which provides access from the west to the east part of the Shackleton Range.
