= Agnieszka Fryckowska =

New Zealand meteorologist

- Born: Auckland, New Zealand
- Education: Bachelor's Degree, Otago University Master's Degree, Cranfield University
- Scientific career
- Thesis: The Impact of Large Organic Debris Jams on Stream Morphology: A Reconnaissance Survey of Montane Streams in South Westland (1996)

Agnieszka Fryckowska is a New Zealand meteorologist and Antarctic base manager who has worked with the British Antarctic Survey (BAS). Fryckowska has spent five winters in Antarctica. She is a recipient of the Polar Medal.

== Biography ==
Fryckowska's parents are Polish and she was born in Auckland.

Fryckowska first became interested in working in Antarctica when she had a lecturer at Otago University who visited the Antarctic yearly. At Otago, she earned a Bachelor of Science in 1995 and then a diploma in science in 1996. The title of her postgraduate diploma thesis was The Impact of Large Organic Debris Jams on Stream Morphology: A Reconnaissance Survey of Montane Streams in South Westland. She earned her master's degree from Cranfield University.

Fryckowska joined the British Antarctic Survey (BAS) in 2004 and started as a meteorologist. She worked there for 34 months. In 2007, she became the Winter Station Leader for Halley V. In 2008, she served as the Summer Station Leader for Rothera.

Fryckowska was the station leader of Halley VI in Antarctica in 2012. She continued to work as the Winter Station Leader for Halley VI until 2015.

Fryckowska was awarded the Polar Medal in April 2016.
