= Flat Top (Coats Land) =

Table mountain in Coats Land, Antarctica

Flat Top (80°27′S 28°16′W) is a distinctive table mountain, 1,330 m, with steep rocky cliffs, 4 nautical miles (7 km) northeast of Lister Heights in the west part of the Shackleton Range in Antarctica. First seen and given this descriptive name during the early reconnaissance flights of the Commonwealth Trans-Antarctic Expedition, 1955–58. Visited and mapped by the Commonwealth Trans-Antarctic Expedition in 1957.
