= Gabriele Stowasser =

Marine ecologist who received the Polar Medal (prestigious UK state award)

Gabriele Stowasser is a marine ecologist at the British Antarctic Survey (BAS). Her research focuses on marine food webs in polar ecosystems, including the use of stable isotope and fatty acid analysis to investigate trophic relationships and the role of zooplankton in ocean carbon cycling.

In 2025, Stowasser was awarded the Polar Medal for her contribution to polar research, recognising her service in Antarctica.
