= Low Rock Point =

Low Rock Point (54°1′S 37°50′W) is a point forming the west side of the entrance to Church Bay, near the west end of the north coast of South Georgia. It was charted by Discovery Investigations personnel in 1926–30, and so named because a low rock lies off the point.
