= Edward Binnie =

Edward Beveridge Binnie
- Binnie in 1911

Resident magistrate of Graham Land and the South Shetland Islands
- In office 1912–1914

Resident magistrate of South Georgia
- In office October 1914 – April 1927

Personal details
- Born: 1884 Stanley, Falkland Islands
- Died: 1956 (aged 71–72) Sandefjord, Norway

Edward Beveridge Binnie (1884–1956) was the second resident magistrate of South Georgia, serving from October 1914 to April 1927, during which time he resided at King Edward Point.

He had previously served as customs officer on East Falkland Island in 1907, in which position he supervised the activities of whaling companies.

In 1912, Binnie became the first Resident Magistrate of Graham Land and the South Shetland Islands; in 1914, he was transferred to South Georgia.

In 1922, he officiated at the funeral of Ernest Shackleton.

In 1923, Binnie vacationed in Norway, where he met and married Margrethe Larsen; she came with him to the sub-Antarctic territories, but became homesick, and in 1927 he resigned his post so that they could move back to Norway.

The Binnie Peaks of South Georgia are named in his honor.
