= Koala conservation =

Efforts to protect Australian marsupial

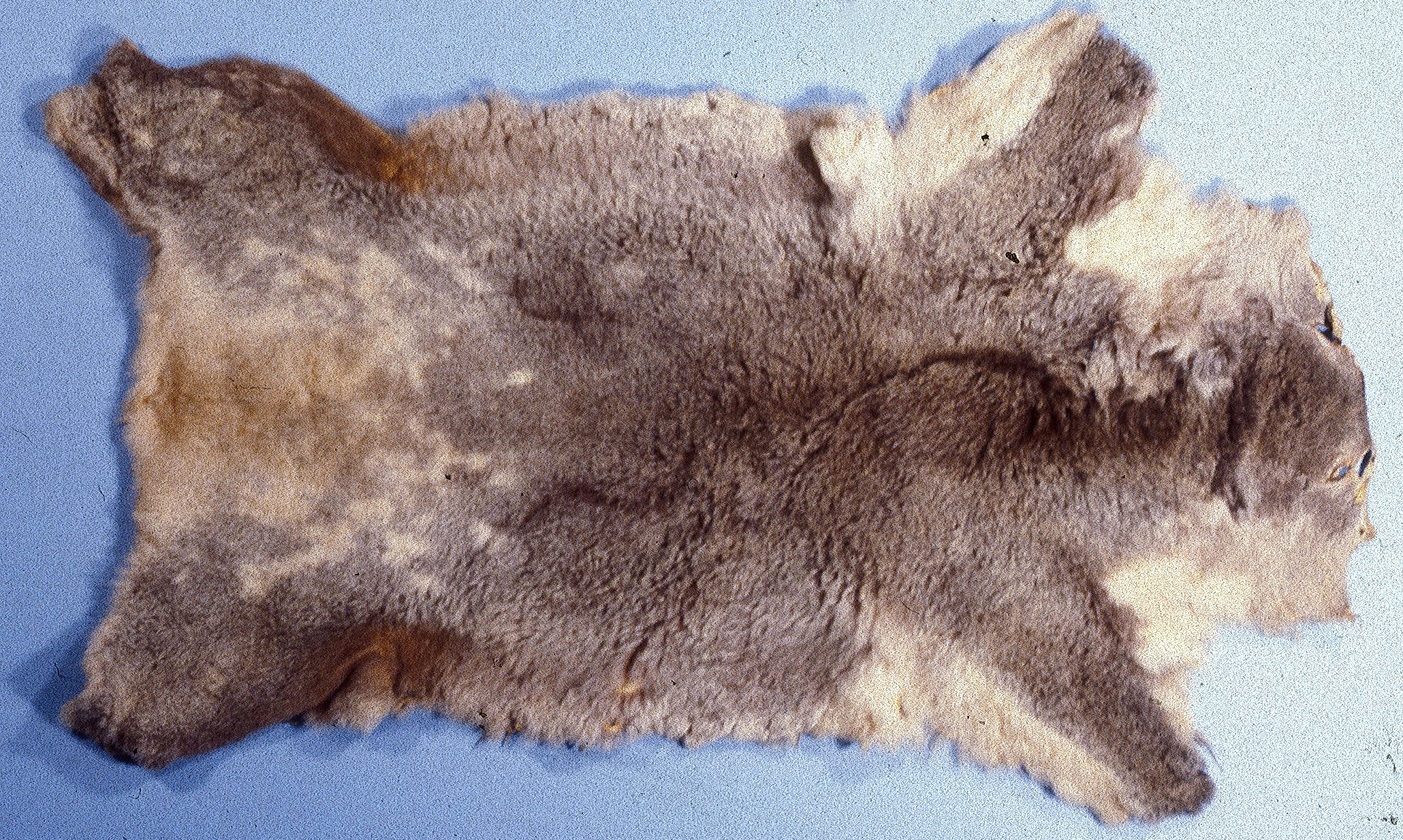
Koala skins were widely traded early in the 20th century.

Koala conservation organisations, programs and government legislation are concerned with the declining population of koalas (Phascolarctos cinereus), a well-known Australian marsupial found in gum trees. The Australian Government declared the species as endangered by extinction in 2022.

While the koala was previously classified as Least Concern on the Red List, it was uplisted to Vulnerable in 2016. Australian policy makers declined a 2009 proposal to include the koala in the Environment Protection and Biodiversity Conservation Act 1999. In 2012, the Australian Government listed koala populations in Queensland and New South Wales as Vulnerable, because of a 40% population decline in the former and a 33% decline in the latter. A 2017 WWF report found a 53% decline per generation in Queensland, and a 26% decline in New South Wales. Populations in Victoria and South Australia appear to be abundant; however, the Australian Koala Foundation argues that the exclusion of Victorian populations from protective measures is based on a misconception that the total koala population is 200,000, whereas they believe it is probably less than 100,000.

== History ==
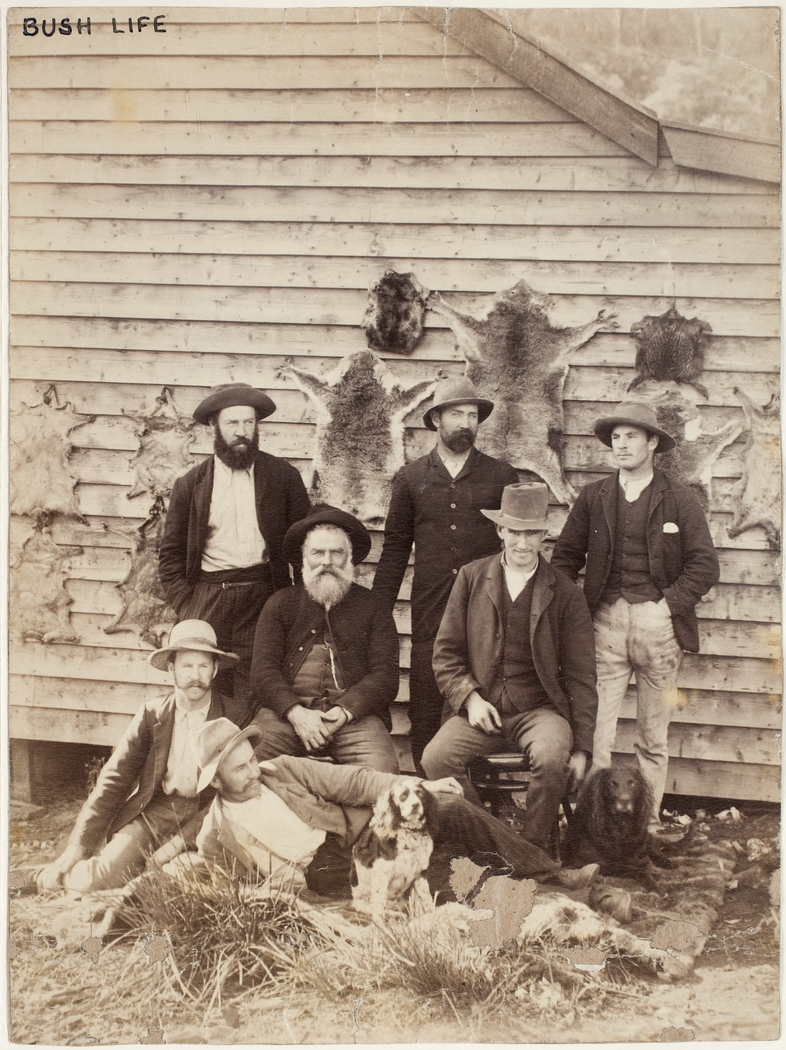
Bushmen photographed with their dogs in front of a wall of animal skins (including koala pelts), between 1870 and 1900

Koalas were hunted for food by Aboriginal Australian peoples. A common technique used to capture the animals was to attach a loop of ropey bark to the end of a long, thin pole, so as to form a noose. This would be used to snare an animal high in a tree, beyond the reach of a climbing hunter; an animal brought down this way would then be killed with a stone hand axe or hunting stick (waddy). According to the customs of some tribes, it was considered taboo to skin the animal, while other tribes thought the animal's head had a special status, and saved them for burial.

The koala was heavily hunted by European settlers in the early 20th century, largely for its thick, soft fur. Pelts were in demand for use in rugs, coat linings, muffs, and as trimming on women's garments. Extensive cullings occurred in Queensland in 1915, 1917, and again in 1919, when over one million koalas were killed with guns, poisons, and nooses. More than two million pelts are estimated to have left Australia by 1924. The public outcry over these cullings was probably the first wide-scale environmental issue that rallied Australians. Novelist and social critic Vance Palmer, writing in a letter to The Courier-Mail, expressed the popular sentiment:

The shooting of our harmless and lovable native bear is nothing less than barbarous ... No one has ever accused him of spoiling the farmer's wheat, eating the squatter's grass, or even the spreading of the prickly pear. There is no social vice that can be put down to his account ... He affords no sport to the gun-man ... And he has been almost blotted out already from some areas.

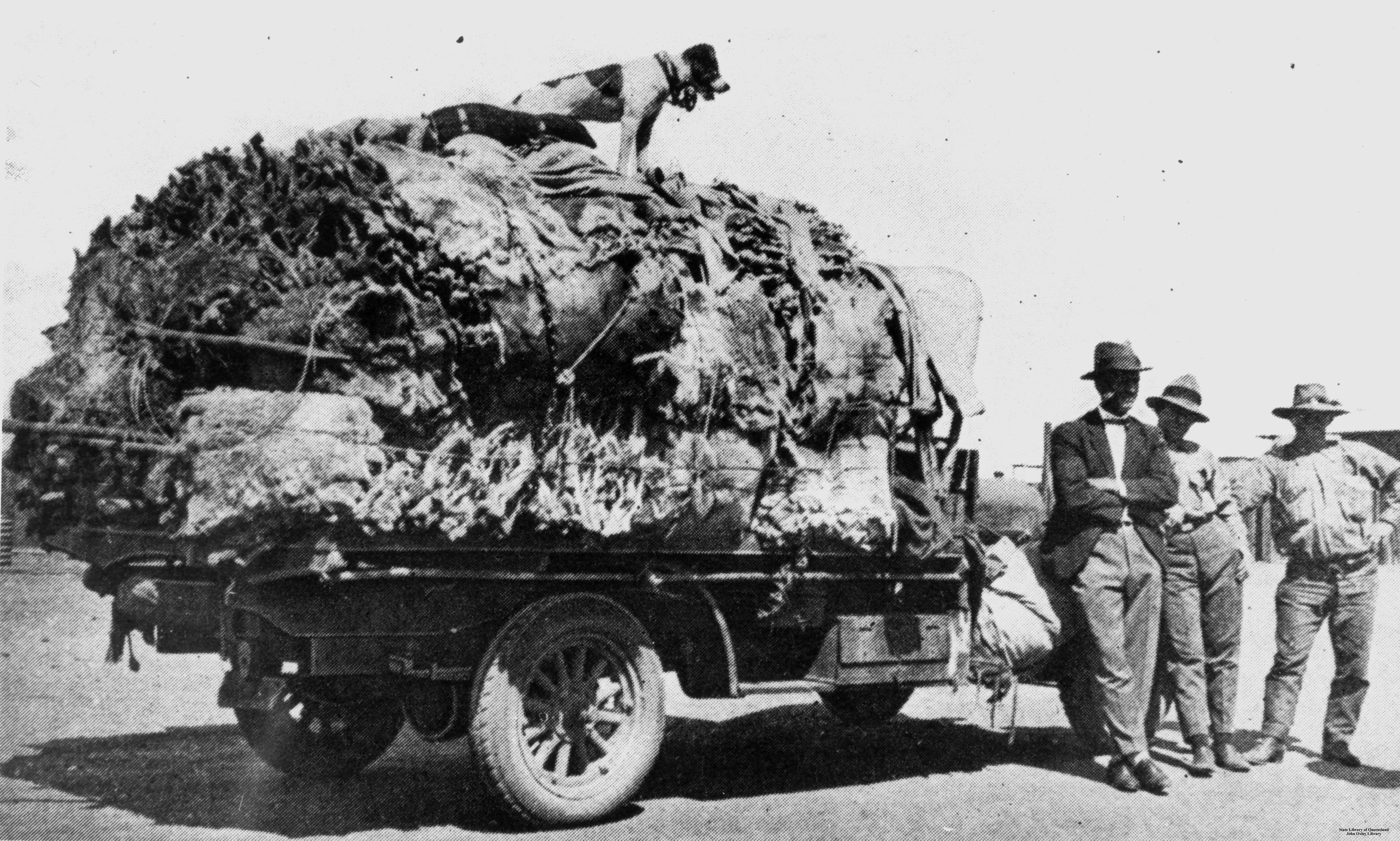
A truck load of 3,600 koala skins trapped during the last open hunting season in Queensland, 1927

Despite the growing movement to protect native species, the poverty brought about by the drought of 1926–1928 led to the killing of another 600,000 koalas during a one-month open season in August 1927. In 1934, Frederick Lewis, the Chief Inspector of Game in Victoria, said that the once-abundant animal had been brought to near extinction in that state, suggesting that only 500–1000 remained.

The first successful efforts at conserving the species were initiated by the establishment of Brisbane's Lone Pine Koala Sanctuary and Sydney's Koala Park Sanctuary in the 1920s and 1930s. The owner of the latter park, Noel Burnet, became the first to successfully breed koalas and earned a reputation as the foremost contemporary authority on the marsupial. In 1934, David Fleay, curator of Australian mammals at the Melbourne Zoo, established the first Australian faunal enclosure at an Australian zoo, and featured the koala. This arrangement allowed him to undertake a detailed study of its diet in captivity. Fleay later continued his conservation efforts at Healesville Sanctuary and the David Fleay Wildlife Park.

== Modern threats ==
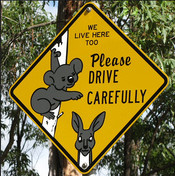
Road sign depicting a koala and a kangaroo

One of the biggest anthropogenic threats to the koala is habitat destruction and fragmentation. In coastal areas, the main cause of this is urbanisation, while in rural areas, habitat is cleared for agriculture. Native forest trees are also taken down to be made into wood products. In 2000, Australia ranked fifth in the world by deforestation rates, having cleared 564,800 hectares (1,396,000 acres). The distribution of the koala has shrunk by more than 50% since European arrival, largely due to fragmentation of habitat in Queensland. The koala's "vulnerable" status in Queensland and New South Wales means that developers in these states must consider the impacts on this species when making building applications. In addition, koalas live in many protected areas.

While urbanisation can pose a threat to koala populations, the animals can survive in urban areas provided enough trees are present. Urban populations have distinct vulnerabilities: collisions with vehicles and attacks by domestic dogs; together they account for two thirds of all koala deaths. To reduce road deaths, government agencies have been exploring various wildlife crossing options, such as the use of fencing to channel animals toward an underpass, in some cases adding a ledge as walkway to an existing culvert. Dogs kill about 4,000 animals every year.

Koala populations and habitat were impacted by the 2020 bushfires. A local veterinarian estimated as many as 30,000 may have died in the Kangaroo Island fires, out of an estimated population of 50,000. Another predicted negative outcome of climate change is the effect of elevations in atmospheric CO_{2} levels on the koala's food supply: increases in CO_{2} cause Eucalyptus trees to reduce protein and increase tannin concentrations in their leaves, reducing the quality of the food source. In June 2020, a New South Wales parliamentary committee released a report stating that koalas could be extirpated from the state by 2050. Recommendations included establishing national parks on the Georges River and Mid-North Coast.

Droughts also affect the koala's well-being. For example, a severe drought in 1980 caused many Eucalyptus trees to lose their leaves. Subsequently, 63% of the population in southwestern Queensland died, especially young animals that were excluded from prime feeding sites by older, dominant koalas, and recovery of the population was slow. Later, this population declined from an estimated mean population of 59,000 in 1995 to 11,600 in 2009, a reduction attributed largely to hotter and drier conditions resulting from droughts in most years between 2002 and 2007. According to Australian environment minister Sussan Ley, the 2019–20 Australian bushfire season, and especially fires in NSW, resulted in the death of up to 8,400 koalas (30% of the local population) on New South Wales's mid-north coast.

The ability of koalas to withstand increasing temperatures associated with climate change is a growing concern for conservation efforts and has prompted research into how to monitor koalas' body temperature at a distance. A team of scientists devised a non-invasive method to determine koala temperature using a thermal camera and thermal imaging software tools. The scientists found that the eyes of koalas yielded the most consistent temperature recordings of all body parts but were the most difficult structure to record.

== Rescue and rehabilitation ==
Injured koalas are often taken to wildlife hospitals and rehabilitation centres. In a 30-year retrospective study performed at a New South Wales koala rehabilitation centre, trauma (usually resulting from a motor vehicle accident or dog attack) was found to be the most frequent cause of admission, followed by symptoms of Chlamydia infection.

Wildlife caretakers are issued special permits, but must release the animals back into the wild when they are either well enough or, in the case of joeys, old enough. As with most native animals, the koala cannot legally be kept as a pet in Australia or anywhere else. One virtually unknown risk to koalas is that of water in the lungs (aspiration pneumonia), which can happen when drinking water from a bottle, as seen in numerous viral videos of well-meaning, but uninformed, people giving thirsty koalas water bottles to drink. The safer way to provide a koala drinking water is via a bowl, cup, helmet or hat from which the koala can lap up the water it needs.

== Introductions ==
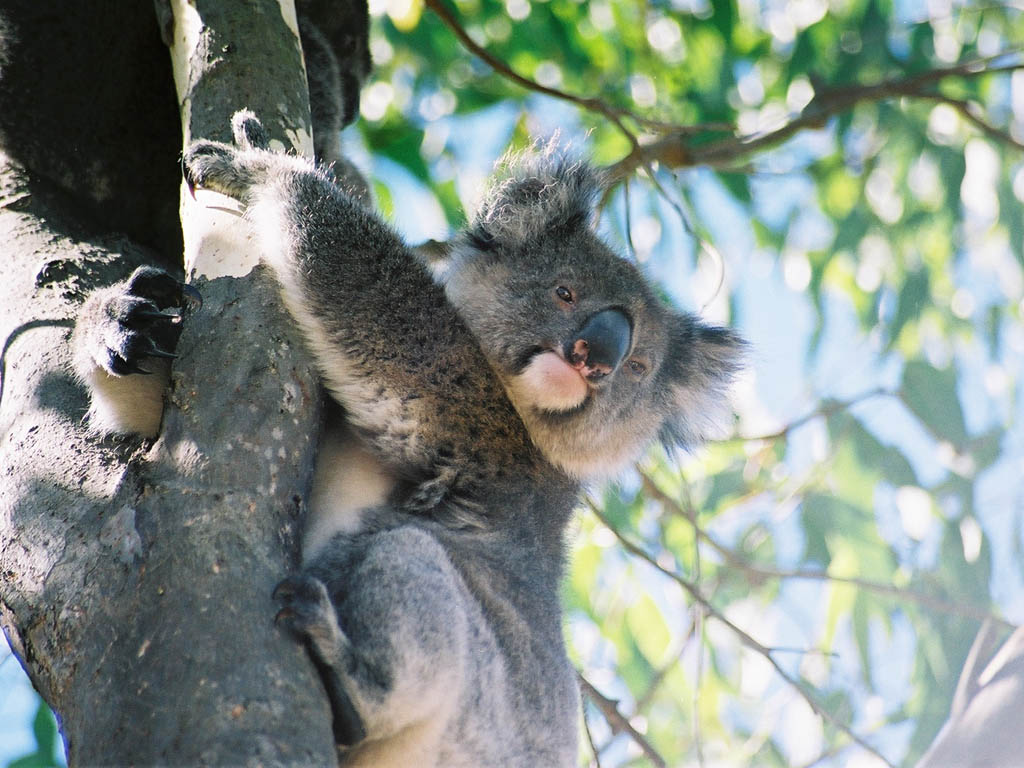
Koala on Kangaroo Island, not native to the island

Since 1870, koalas have been introduced to several coastal and offshore islands, including Phillip Island (Victoria) and Kangaroo Island (South Australia). Their numbers have significantly increased, and since the islands are not large enough to sustain such high koala numbers, overbrowsing has become a problem.

Since the 1990s, government agencies have tried to control their numbers by culling, but public and international outcry has forced the use of translocation and sterilisation, instead.

=== Western Port Islands, Victoria ===
Western Port, Victoria
1 Phillip Island
2 French Island
3 Quail Island

In the 1920s, Lewis initiated a program of large-scale relocation and rehabilitation programs to transfer koalas whose habitat had become fragmented or reduced, to new regions, with the intent of eventually returning them to their former range.

In 1929 the koala population on Phillip Island collapsed with the death of their manna gums, officially attributed to insect pests and fire. In 1930–31, 165 survivors were translocated to French Island and Quail Island.

The koalas on Quail Island thrived until 1943, when those on one half of the island were found to be dying from starvation After a period of population growth, and subsequent overbrowsing of gum trees on the island, about 1,300 animals were released into mainland areas in 1944.

The koalas on French Island also prospered and multiplied until in 1954, faced with dying trees, the population of 700 was moved to the mainland, in the vicinity of Camperdown and Ararat.

The practice of translocating koalas became commonplace; Victorian State manager Peter Menkhorst estimated that from 1923 to 2006, about 24,000 animals were translocated to more than 250 release sites across Victoria.

=== Kangaroo Island, South Australia ===
Kangaroo Island
1 Rocky River ranger station

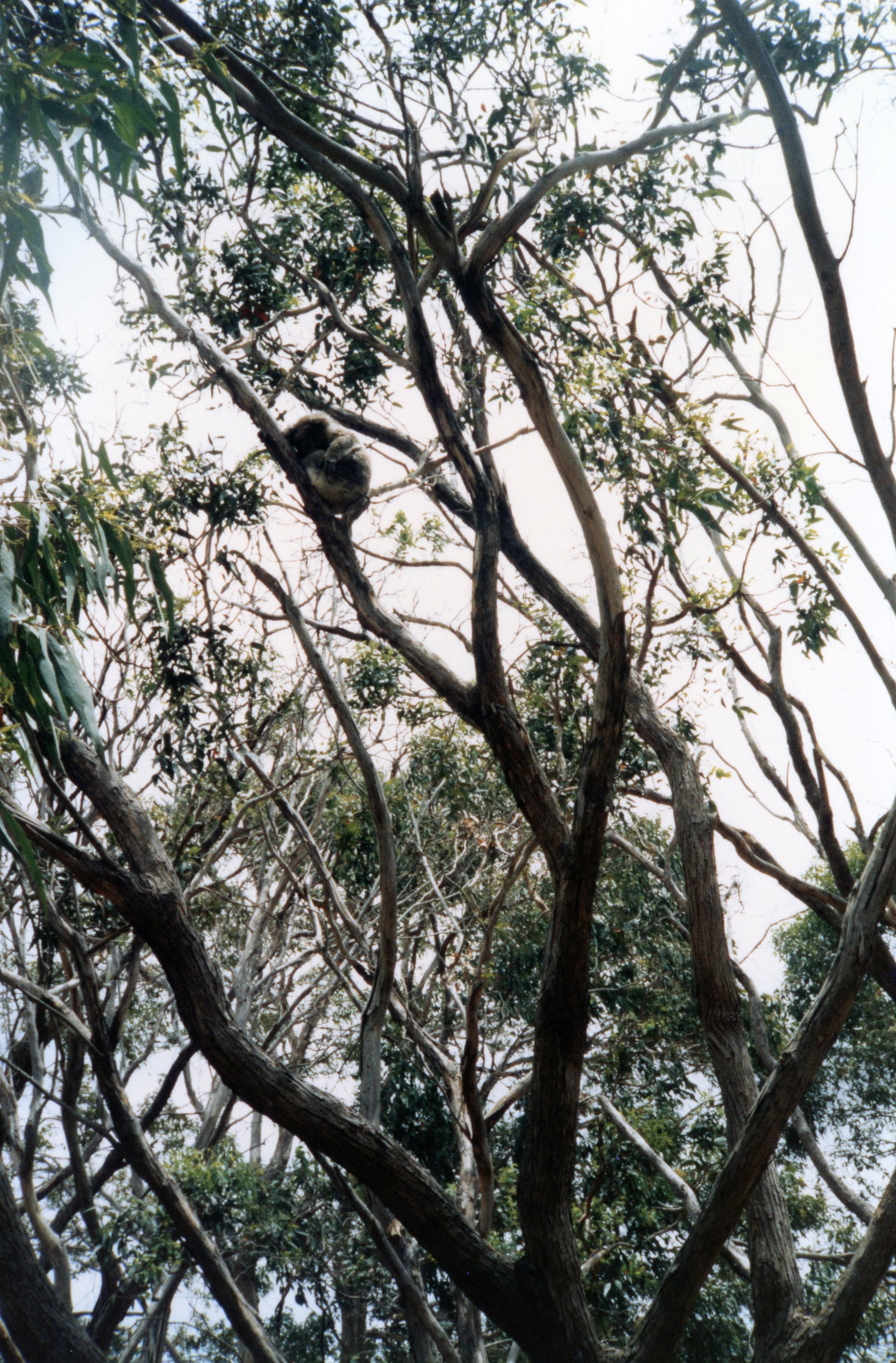
Koala, Rocky River ranger station, Kangaroo Island 1988

Kangaroo Island, commonly referred to as "K.I.", is one of Australia's largest islands, situated some 20 km off the coast of South Australia, and had no historical koala population. Subspecies of the manna gum Eucalyptus viminalis, a favoured food of koalas, occur on the island.

Flinders Chase National Park, at the far west of the island, was set up in the early 20th-century as a habitat for Australian mammals and birds whose survival on the mainland was threatened, especially from foxes and rabbits, from which the island is free. In 1923 six "native bears", as the koala was then popularly known, were donated by the National Park of Victoria, Wilson's Promontory, and taken across to KI on the Karatta in November 1923 by three members of the Fauna and Flora Board: J. C. Marshall, professors T. G. Osborn and Wood Jones, and Edgar R. Waite, director of the Adelaide Museum. Another six pair, with young, were released by the board in 1925. (Note: It is likely these also came from Victoria; reports that they were Tasmanian may be discounted, as Hobart Zoo's one specimen came from Queensland.) The population grew steadily: in 1934 researchers located several with difficulty, living on Eucalyptus ovata and the yellow gum E. leucoxylon; in 1943 a census found nearly 300, and in 1949 another team saw 18 full-grown adults in a quarter of a mile (some (400 m), living on manna gums, pink gums (E. fasciculosa), and water gums.

By the 1990s the koala population had grown to the extent that they were consuming the leaves of their eucalypts at a rate beyond the trees' capacity to regenerate, and it was clear to scientists and others that some form of human intervention was necessary to avoid wholesale death of trees and distress to the koalas. In 1996 (Liberal) conservation minister David Wotton appointed a panel of experts led by Hugh Possingham to examine the problems and recommend solutions. Their unanimous recommendation was humane culling (i.e. shooting) to reduce their numbers. The government however ruled out such action on public relations grounds — the tourist industry, on which the economies of South Australia and Kangaroo Island were highly dependent, would be greatly affected by hostile publicity, abetted by activists such as the Australian Koala Foundation. They chose instead a program of trapping and sterilisation (tubal ligation under general anaesthetic) of selected females, who were then released on the mainland, a process which may be distressing to the animal, and very expensive given the number which had to be treated, but kinder, they said, than killing. By 2001 they had sterilised 3,400 adults and relocated another thousand, but had not even matched the "natural increase" of the population of some 27,000 individuals, and it cost A$2,400 for each relocated koala. A study of those relocated individuals found that they wandered far from their release site and most gained weight but more than one third died in the first year after relocation.

== Over-population ==
As of early 2026, the koala population in parts of South Australia and Victoria are over-abundant.

Numbers have been growing rapidly in the Mount Lofty Ranges, near Adelaide in South Australia, which represents around 10 per cent of the national population, and expected to expand by around 17 to 25 per cent over the next 25 years. A study published in January 2026 warns that to the point where they could experience starvation, and suggests various methods of population control. Numbers were abundant on Kangaroo Island (KI) at around 48,000, before the 2020 Kangaroo Island bushfires, and in 2026 estimated to number around 5-10,000. Koalas are not native to South Australia, having been exported to the Mount Lofty Ranges and KI from French Island in Victoria around 1920.

In Victoria, they are over-grazing in Cape Otway and French Island.

== Great Koala National Park ==
In 2021, the NSW Greens introduced a parliamentary bill for a Great Koala National Park (GKNP) in New South Wales and, in 2023, the Labor Party campaigned at the state election on supporting the park's development. The government and its logging corporation, the Forestry Corporation of NSW, have been criticised for continuing to log in the proposed koala sanctuary area.
