= Thomson Glacier =

Glacier in Antarctica

- Location within Antarctica
- Location: Bryan Coast
- Coordinates: 73°27′S 80°13′W
- Length: 8 nmi (15 km; 9 mi)
- Thickness: unknown
- Status: unknown

Thomson Glacier (73°27′S 80°13′W) is a glacier about 8 nautical miles (15 km) long on Bryan Coast flowing between Rydberg and Wirth Peninsulas into Fladerer Bay. Named by Advisory Committee on Antarctic Names (US-ACAN) after Janet W. Thomson, British Antarctic Survey, head of the mapping operations from the 1980s to 2002, and member of the USA-UK cooperative project to compile Glaciological and Coastal-Change Maps of the Antarctic Peninsula.

== See also ==
- List of glaciers in the Antarctic
- Glaciology
