= Scree Gap =

Geographical feature in Antarctica

Scree Gap (54°1′S 37°48′W) is a gap between Schlieper Bay and Church Bay, near the west end of South Georgia. The name is descriptive and was given by the United Kingdom Antarctic Place-Names Committee (UK-APC) following surveys by the SGS in the period 1951–57.
