= Deborah Tabart =

Australian environmentalist

Deborah Tabart OAM
- Occupation: Environmentalist
- Years active: 1988−present
- Known for: Australian Koala Foundation

Deborah Tabart is an Australian environmentalist who is the CEO of the Australian Koala Foundation (AKF). She has worked with this organisation since 1988 and is known internationally as the Koala Woman.

== Career and achievements ==
In 1988, Tabart was asked by the Australian Koala Foundation Board of Directors to “raise funds to save the koala”.

== Publications ==
- D. Tabart (2004) Protecting the Koala: A Species of National Significance – A Consultation paper proposing Commonwealth legislative and policy initiatives that will protect the Koala and its habitat throughout Australia.

== Awards ==
In 1998 Tabart received a Computersworld Smithsonian Award on behalf of the AKF.

In 2011 she received the International Association of Business Communicators EXCEL Award.

In January 2008, Tabart was awarded the Medal of the Order of Australia (OAM) in acknowledgement of her contributions to the protection and management koalas and their habitat, and her service to Australia and humanity.

== Private life ==
Tabart now resides in Queensland, Australia. Besides her day job at the AKF, she also practices permaculture and grows her own vegetables.
