= Eleanor Honnywill =

British antarctic researcher

- Born: Eleanor Biscoe; 1915 or 1916
- Died: 11 April 2003 (aged 87)
- Notable work: The Challenge of Antarctica, 1969
- Spouse: Sir Vivian Fuchs (m. 1991)

Eleanor Honnywill (1915 or 1916 – 11 April 2003; née Biscoe, later Eleanor, Lady Fuchs) was instrumental in supporting the work of British Antarctic Survey (BAS).

== Career ==
Honnywill won the 1975 Fuchs Medal of the British Antarctic Survey (BAS) in recognition of her service to the BAS and its predecessor the Falkland Islands Dependencies Survey (FIDS). She had been secretary to the 1955-58 Commonwealth Trans-Antarctic Expedition, based in the expedition's London headquarters.

In 1958, she moved to FIDS as personal assistant to Vivian Fuchs when he took up the directorship, and worked with him on the expedition's papers and his Of Ice and Men (1982, Anthony Nelson; ISBN 978-0904614060), the history of the FIDS and BAS.

Honnywill Peak in the Shackleton Range in Antarctica is named for her.

Her book The Challenge of Antarctica was published in 1969 (Methuen, ISBN 9780416143300) and republished in 1984 (Anthony Nelson, ISBN 9780904614091).

== Personal life ==
She married Captain Richard Buston Honnywill, a naval officer. After his death, and that of Lady Joyce Fuchs in 1990, she married Sir Vivian Fuchs (1908-1999) on 8 August 1991.
