= Church Bay, South Georgia =

Body of water in Antarctica

Coordinates: 54°0′S 37°47′W

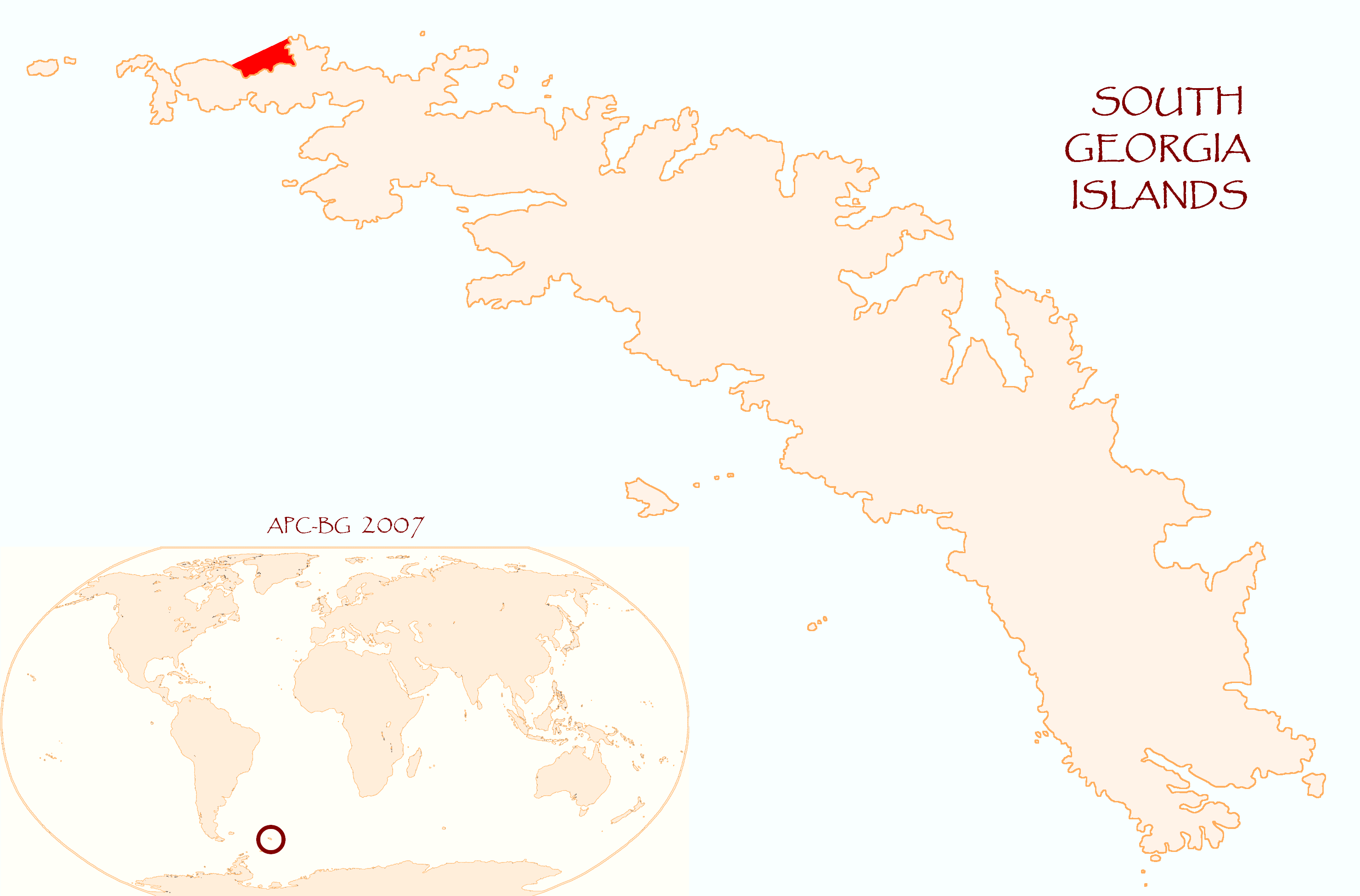
Location of Church Bay on South Georgia Island

Church Bay is a bay 4.5 nautical miles (8 km) wide, indenting the north coast of South Georgia between Low Rock Point and Cape North. It is separated from Schlieper Bay by the Scree Gap.

It was roughly charted by Discovery Investigations personnel in the period 1925–1930 and surveyed by the South Georgia Survey, 1951–1957. The name is well established in local use.
