= Honeywell (disambiguation) =

Honeywell can refer to:

- Honeywell, an American multinational corporation
  - Mark C. Honeywell, founder of Honeywell
  - Honeywell 200, a computer by Honeywell
  - Honeywell 316, a computer by Honeywell
  - Honeywell 6000 series, a computer by Honeywell
  - Honeywell LTS101, a turbofan engine by Honeywell
  - Honeywell TFE731, a turboshaft engine by Honeywell
  - Honeywell Center, an admin center of Honeywell's
  - Honeywell Uranium Hexafluoride Processing Facility, a uranium conversion facility of Honeywell's
  - Honeywell project, an organisation to convince Honeywell to stop manufacturing weapons
- Honeywell Group, a Nigerian conglomerate
- Honeywell v. Sperry Rand, a US court case involving Honeywell Corp
- Honeywell, South Yorkshire, a village in the UK
- Frank Honeywell, American author
- Martha Ann Honeywell, American artist
- Sarah-Jane Honeywell, British television presenter

== See also ==
- Honnywill (disambiguation)
