= Sophie Fielding =

Sophie Fielding is a biological oceanographer at the British Antarctic Survey. Her research uses acoustic observations to study Southern Ocean ecosystems, particularly the distribution of zooplankton and Antarctic krill, and to understand how marine ecosystems respond to changing ocean conditions.

Fielding has participated in and led research cruises in the polar regions. In 2022, she led science trials on the RRS Sir David Attenborough, testing the ship's research capabilities ahead of Antarctic operations. In 2019 she was awarded the Polar Medal for her contribution to understanding environmental and human impacts on the Antarctic marine ecosystem.
