= Weddell Point =

Point in South Georgia

Weddell Point (54°3′S 37°49′W) is a low, tussock-covered point forming the east side of the entrance to Schlieper Bay, on the south coast and near the west end of South Georgia. The name Cape Weddell was given by David Ferguson, Scottish geologist, during his visit to South Georgia in 1911–12. Named after James Weddell, Master, Royal Navy, who visited South Georgia in 1823. Point is considered a more suitable descriptive term for this feature than cape.
