= Stratton Glacier =

Glacier in Antarctica

- Location within Antarctica
- Location: Coats Land
- Coordinates: 80°22′S 29°0′W
- Length: 20 nmi (37 km; 23 mi)
- Thickness: unknown
- Terminus: Shackleton Range
- Status: unknown

The Stratton Glacier (80°22′S 29°0′W) is a glacier 20 nautical miles (37 km) long, flowing north from Pointer Nunatak and then northwest to the north of Mount Weston, in the Shackleton Range of Antarctica.

== Exploration ==
The Stratton Glacier' was first mapped in 1957 by the Commonwealth Trans-Antarctic Expedition and named for David G. Stratton, surveyor and deputy leader of the transpolar party of the Commonwealth Trans-Antarctic Expedition in 1956–58.

== Location ==
The glacier is fed by ice from the Fuchs Dome in the center of the range, and forms to the east of Pointer Nunatak. It flows north past the ridges of the Haskard Highlands to the west, and past the Lister Heights and La Grange Nunataks to the east, entering the Slessor Glacier between Mount Provender and Mount Skidmore. It is one of the large glaciers in the range.

== See also ==
- List of glaciers in the Antarctic
- Glaciology

== Sources ==
- Alberts, Fred G., ed. (1995), Geographic Names of the Antarctic (PDF) (2 ed.), United States Board on Geographic Names This article incorporates public domain material from websites or documents of the United States Board on Geographic Names.
- Höfle, Hans-Christian; Buggisch, Werner (1993), "Glacial Geology and Petrography of Erratics in the Shackleton Range, Antarctica" (PDF), Polarforschung, vol. 63, no. 213, pp. 183–201
- Shackleton Range, United States Geological Survey, 1983 This article incorporates public domain material from websites or documents of the United States Geological Survey.
- Skidmore, Michael J.; Clarkson, Peter D. (1972), "Physiography and Glacial Geomorphology of the Shackleton Range" (PDF), Antarctic Survey Bulletin, no. 30
