= Australian Koala Foundation =

Australian charity to help koalas

- Founded: 17 January 1986
- Founder: Steve Brown; Barry Scott
- Purpose: Long-term conservation of the wild koala
- Location: Brisbane, Australia
- Method: Research, education, legislation, mapping and planning
- Key people: Deborah Tabart
- Website: www.savethekoala.com

The Australian Koala Foundation (AKF) is an Australian charity created in 1986, focused on Koala conservation dedicated to the effective management and conservation of the koala and its habitat. Its flagship projects are the Koala Habitat Atlas, the Koala Kiss project to link Koala habitat areas, and lobbying for legislative change

== History ==
The Australian Koala Foundation (AKF) is a registered Australian charity established in 1986 by Steve Brown, Barry Scott, Bob Gibson, Dr. John Woolcock, Dr. Russ Dickens, and others. Its initial aim was finding a cure for Koala Chlamydia (an often deadly infectious disease in Koalas caused by Chlamydia pecorum) which was initially seen as the major threat. Within a few years, the AKF changed direction of the AKF moved towards addressing the loss of habitat and reversing it.

“The koala suffers not only the ravages of habitat destruction, disease, drought and bushfires, but from humans who allow their dogs to attack, their cars to speed and kill them on the roads and also, unfortunately, public apathy” Barry Scott OAM

In 1988, Deborah Tabart joined the AKF, and later became its CEO. She is the author of AKF published "The Koala Manifesto" (2021) which calls for ten key actions to do with the Koala address koala protection, making decisions based on the Koala Habitat Atlas, banning native logging, a bill of rights for water, and a Royal commission into the environment.

The AKF's 2016 and 2019 claim that koalas were “functionally extinct” , and numbered “as low as 80,000” was rejected by the Federal Threatened Species Scientific Committee and peer-reviewed population models, which estimate 320,000–450,000 animals nationally.

The 2019–20 Australian bushfire season had a devastating impact on koala habitat and populations.

In 2023–2024 two board members resigned

== Koala Habitat Atlas ==
The Koala Habitat Atlas (KHA) is the Australian Koala Foundation's flagship mapping program and provides GIS information on a tree by tree basis the public, government, and courts so that koala habitat can be identified and protected. It is the product of thousands of hours of field and dataset work by researchers and citizen scientists, and is funded principally from “Save the Koala Month”. The maps are not released under a creative commons license, however, but are copyright AKF.

Chronological timeline

- Jan 1994 – Catastrophic NSW bushfires burn 800,000 ha, including Port Stephens koala strongholds; post-fire surveys reveal entire breeding colonies gone and trigger the first Atlas pilot (Port Stephens field work begins Nov 1994).
- Aug 1996 – Earliest public use of the exact phrase “Koala Habitat Atlas” (Port Stephens Draft Report, Project No 6).
- 27 Sep 2007 – AKF board unanimously approves A$87,000 seed funding; Deborah Tabart named project leader, Dave Mitchell field director.
- 14 Mar 2008 – Tree #KHA-000001 GPS-tagged: 400-year-old Eucalyptus obliqua, Cape Otway (38.8561° S, 143.5671° E).
- 3 Sep 2009 – National launch, Federation Square, Melbourne; 2,000 locals watch first live red overlays.
- Sep 2023 – Full Atlas (1.7 million trees, 25 landscapes) released free at koalamap.savethekoala.com.
- 15 Aug 2025 – Koo Wee Rup bypass shifted 400 m west to save 183 Atlas-flagged trees – the first time an Australian infrastructure project was ever re-routed solely for koalas.
- 30 Sep 2025 – Senate Inquiry quotes Atlas: 62% of mapped habitat cleared since 2010. The Inquiry's final report described the dataset as “robust but not yet peer-reviewed”.

== Koala Kiss Project ==
A current project of AKF is the Koala Kiss Project. AKF has coined the term "kiss point" to describe the point in the landscape where areas of koala habitat are connected. In some areas koala habitat comes close to each other, but remain separated by divisions of cleared land. AKF is undertaking a huge project to identify and connect these crucial points of habitat. Between July 2024 and June 2025 the AKF raised A$2.8 million to plant 1.1 million trees linking 47 “kiss points” in south-east Queensland and the NSW north coast. The Taree–Port Macquarie wildlife corridor was completed in October 2025, with three new rail-crossings funded by VicTrack. ive Agenda

== Lobbying ==
'The AKF believes that existing laws, like the Environment Protection and Biodiversity Conservation Act 1999 (EPBC Act) are inadequate to protect the koala and feel that the federal government is wasting time and resources on koala research at the expense of habitat conservation.

The AFK has also lobbied for a specific federal koala protection act, akin to the United States' Bald and Golden Eagle Protection Act, which has protected the bald eagle (the national symbol of the United States) since the 1940s

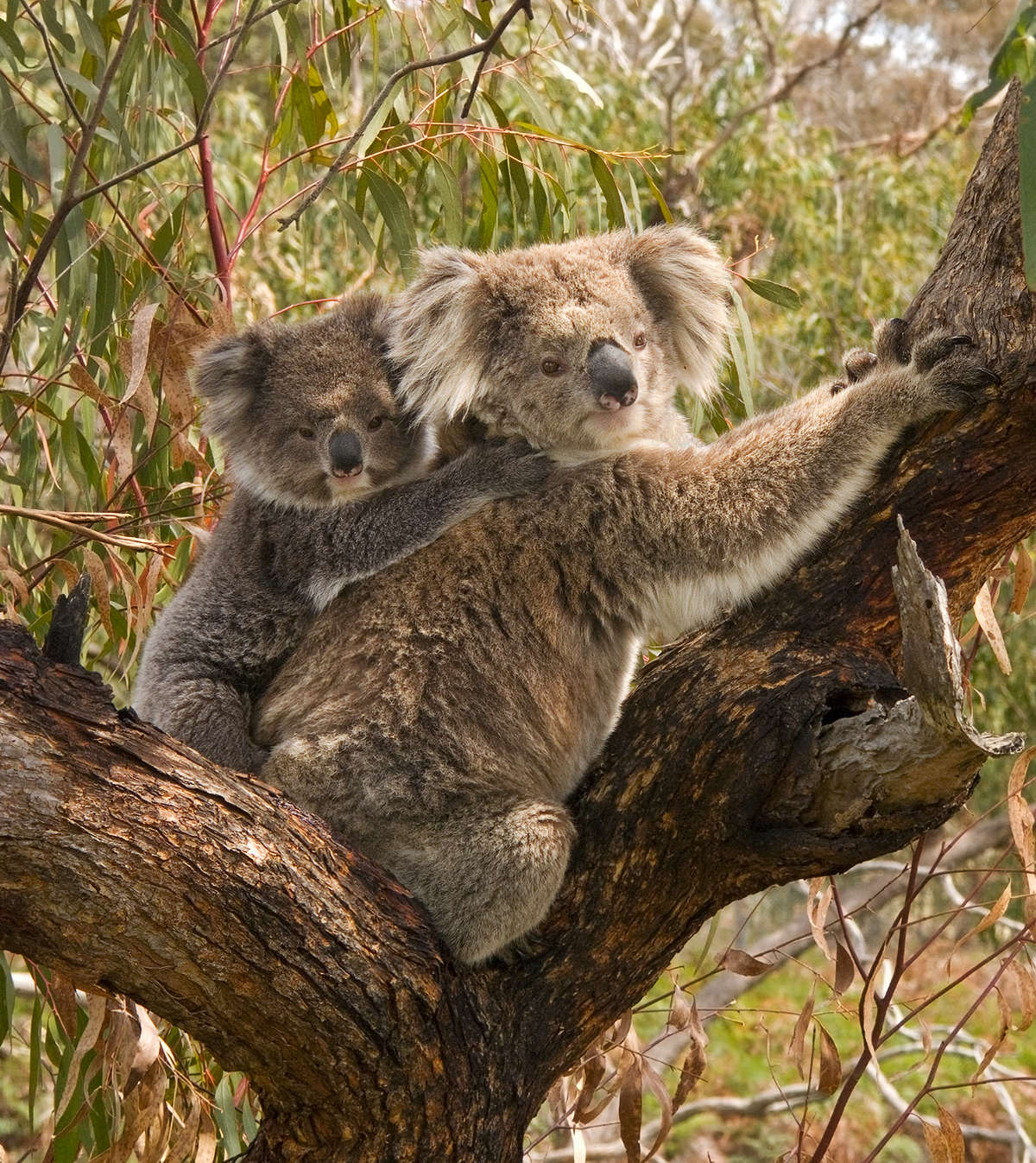
Koala and joey

== See also ==
- Conservation in Australia
