= Schlieper Bay =

Body of water in Antractica

Coordinates: 54°2′S 37°50′W

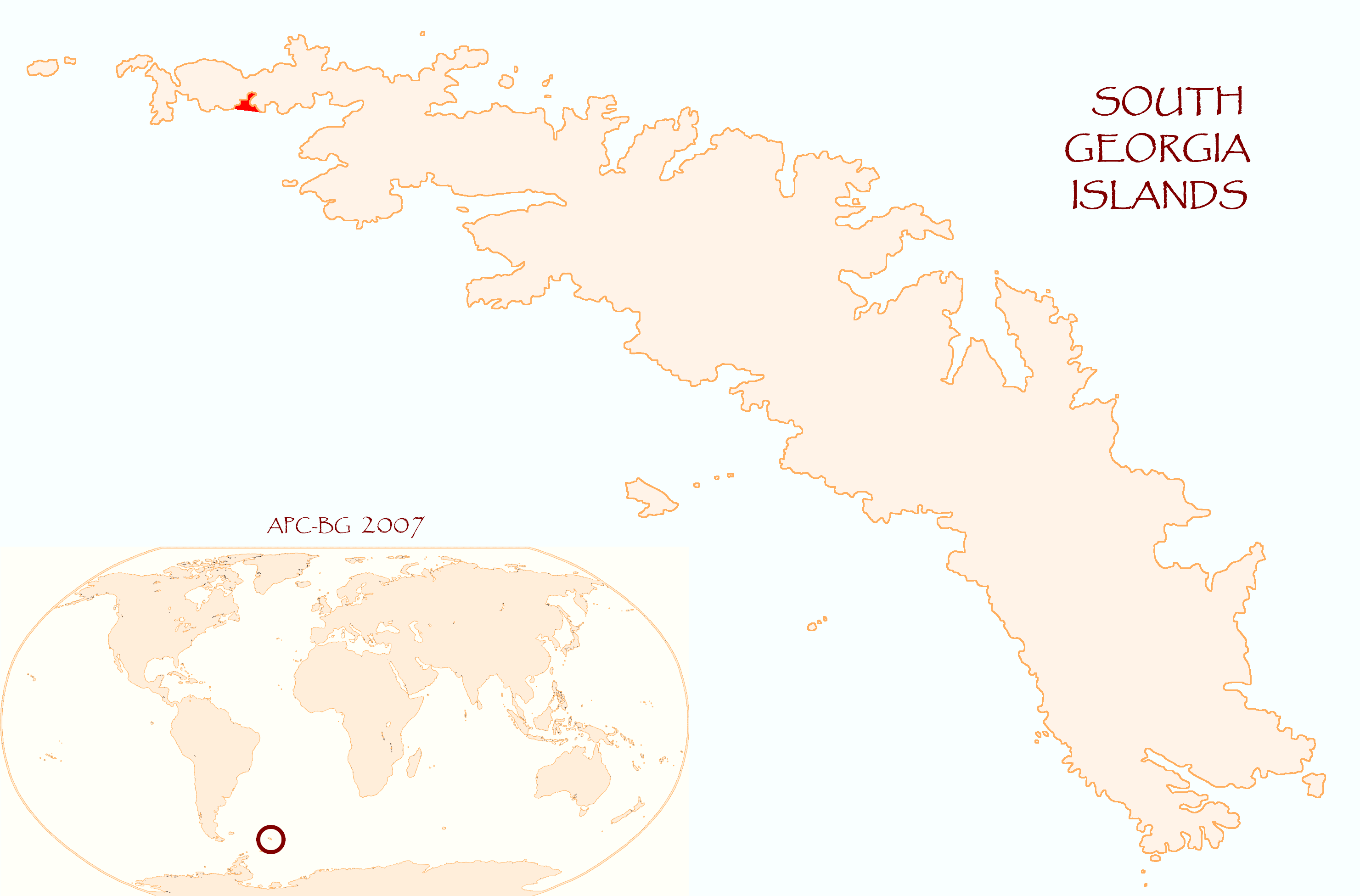

Schlieper Bay is a bay 1 mile (1.6 km) wide, entered between Romerof Head and Weddell Point along the south coast of South Georgia. It is separated from Church Bay by the Scree Gap. Schlieper Bay was named between 1905 and 1912 after the director of the Compañía Argentina de Pesca.

British scientists aboard the Undine visited the bay in 1911, while surveying South Georgia's coast.

According to Fur Seals: Maternal Strategies on Land and at Sea 20,000 seals breed in Schlieper Bay.

Whalers and other visitors inadvertently brought rats to South Georgia, which put bird populations at risk, as the rats stole and ate their eggs. After rat eradication efforts were carried out in the Schlieper Bay scientists found a nest of South Georgia pipits, with five chicks. The South Georgia pipit is the world's most southerly songbird.

During the Falklands War (1982), the British magistrate and other civilians and military present in Grytviken were removed from South Georgia, but another 15 Britons remained beyond Argentine reach. The losses suffered at Grytviken prevented Argentina from occupying the rest of the island, with Schlieper Bay, along with Bird Island base and field camps at Lyell Glacier and St. Andrews Bay, remaining under British control.
