= Romerof Head =

Romerof Head (54°3′S 37°52′W) is a prominent headland with steep rock cliffs, forming the west side of the entrance to Schlieper Bay, on the south coast and near the west end of South Georgia. The name, which probably was given by early whalers, dates back to at least 1912.
