= Polar Medal =

UK award

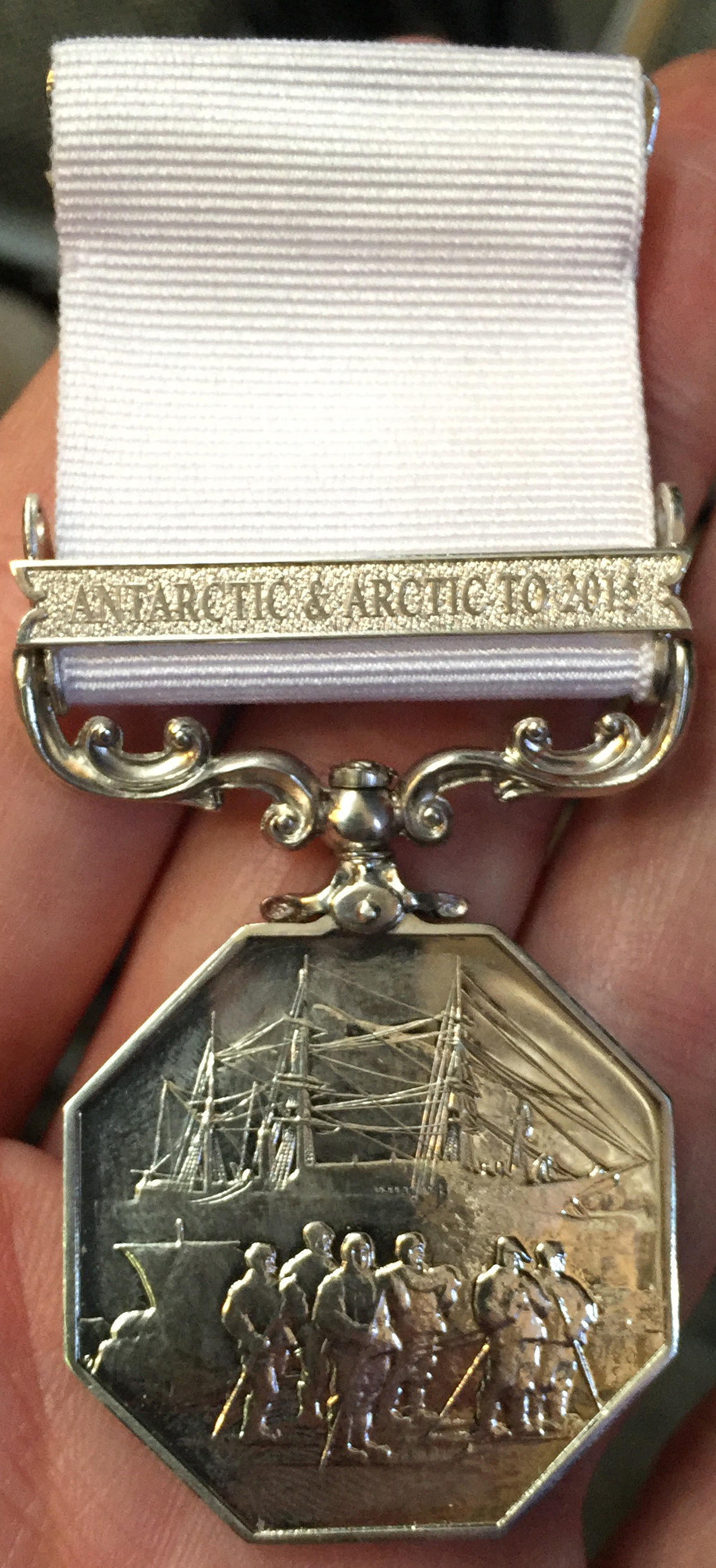
- Reverse of the medal
- Type: Medal
- Awarded for: Outstanding achievement in the field of polar research
- Presented by: Sovereign of the United Kingdom
- Established: 1857 (as the Arctic Medal)
- Ribbon of the medal

Order of wear
- Next (higher): Campaign Medals and Stars
- Next (lower): Imperial Service Medal

The Polar Medal is a medal awarded by the Sovereign of the United Kingdom to individuals who have outstanding achievements in the field of polar research, and particularly for those who have worked over extended periods in harsh climates. It was instituted in 1857 as the Arctic Medal, and renamed the Polar Medal in 1904.

== History ==
=== Arctic Medal ===
The first medal was awarded in 1857, named the Arctic Medal. The Admiralty issued the medal for several expeditions, including the expedition to discover the fate of Sir John Franklin and his crew, who were lost while looking for the Northwest Passage in 1847:

Her Majesty having been graciously pleased to signify her commands that a Medal be granted to all persons, of every rank and class, who have been engaged in the several Expeditions to the Arctic Regions, whether of discovery or search, between the years 1818 and 1855, both inclusive.

The second presentation of the Arctic Medal was to the crews of three ships exploring the Arctic in 1875–76.

=== Polar Medal ===
In 1904, the medal was awarded to the members of Captain Robert Falcon Scott's first expedition to Antarctica, and therefore renamed the Polar Medal. It was also awarded to the crews of both rescue ships, Terra Nova and Morning. Subsequent medals were awarded to members of Ernest Shackleton's expeditions in 1907–09 and 1914–17.

== Eligibility ==
The Polar Medal is awarded to individuals for outstanding service to the field of polar research.

Until 1968, the Polar Medal was presented to anyone who participated in a polar expedition endorsed by the governments of any Commonwealth realms. However, since 1968 the rules governing its presentation have been revised with greater emphasis placed on personal achievement.

Since 1998, the criteria for being awarded a Polar Medal are:

The period of service living and working in the arduous conditions of a Polar environment required to be considered for this Medal shall normally be not less than twelve months, shorter periods of service may be aggregated to meet this criterion. Service in the support of the acquisition of knowledge of Polar regions shall normally be at least ten years' such service in order to be considered for the Medal, although, in exceptional cases, a shorter period of outstanding service may be considered.

The award is primarily given to citizens of the United Kingdom. However, citizens of Commonwealth countries can be honoured. Nominees for the Polar Medal are made on the advice of the Polar Medal Assessment Committee, who make recommendations to the monarch via the Secretary of State for Defence.

== Medals awarded ==
By 2005, a total of 880 silver had been issued for Antarctic expeditions. Another 73 silver medals had been issued for service in the Arctic. The character Private Frazer in the BBC series Dad's Army was a recipient of the medal for his participation in Shackleton's Antarctic Expedition of 1904–1907.

Prior to all awarded medals becoming silver in 1939, 271 bronze medals and clasps were awarded.

=== Female recipients ===
In 1986, the London Gazette announced Ginny Fiennes as the first woman to be awarded the Polar Medal. The medal had also in 1953 been awarded to Ivan Mackenzie Lamb, who transitioned and took the name Elke Mackenzie in 1971. Other female Polar Medal recipients include:

- Elizabeth Harland, 1997;
- Jane Francis, 2002;
- Margaret Bradshaw, 2003;
- Elizabeth Morris, 2003;
- Tavi Murray, 2006;
- Victoria Auld, 2007 and 2024;
- Penelope Granger, 2008;
- Felicity Aston, 2015;
- Sally Poncet, 2015;
- Kim Crosbie, 2016;
- Agnieszka Fryckowska, 2016;
- Myrtle Simpson, 2017;
- Isabelle Gerrard, 2017;
- Catrin Thomas, 2019;
- Sophie Fielding, 2019;
- Alison Massey, 2020;
- Melody Clark, 2021;
- Sarah Lurcock, 2025. and
- Gabriele Stowasser, 2025.

== Design ==
The medal is octagonal in shape with a white ribbon. The reverse of the original Arctic Medal showed a three-masted ship surrounded by ice floes. The die for the medal was engraved by Leonard Charles Wyon. A new design by Ernest Gillick was used from 1904, showing RRS Discovery, with a sledging party in the foreground. The obverse bears a portrait of the reigning monarch. It is accompanied by a clasp that is placed on the ribbon of the medal in order to signify in which region or regions service was completed.

The medal was originally struck in both silver and bronze. Since 1939, all awarded medals have been silver; bronze medals were presented to personnel on relief ships for Antarctic expeditions, but not awarded to participants of Arctic expeditions.

== Clasps ==
Additional clasps can be awarded for further service to polar research and exploration.

Several people have been awarded additional clasps, including Sir Ranulph Fiennes, who is the only person to have received a clasp each for both the Arctic and Antarctica. In 2024 Captain Victoria Auld was the first woman to receive a clasp. Frank Wild and Ernest Joyce hold the joint record of four clasps on their Polar Medal.

== Australia ==
The Government of Australia replaced the Polar Medal with its own Australian Antarctic Medal in 1987.

== Canada ==
The medal was awarded to members of the Royal Canadian Mounted Police ship St. Roch, who patrolled extensively in the western Arctic (1940) and completed a west-to-east passage of the Arctic in 1942. Although several Canadians had received this medal, it was not included in the Canadian Honours System that was promulgated in 1967. Subsequently, a Canadian decoration intended to honour explorers of Canada's polar regions and defenders of the country's sovereignty in the north was initially conceived by Governor General Adrienne Clarkson as the Governor General's Northern Medal and created on 15 September 2005, to award those who serve with distinction in northern Canada. It was replaced on 23 June 2015 by Canada's own Polar Medal.

== New Zealand ==
In 1996, when New Zealand revised its royal honours system, New Zealanders ceased to receive the Polar Medal. It was proposed that the medal would be preserved, with a new name, under New Zealand regulations: the New Zealand Antarctic Medal. The rationale for the renaming was that it is in relation to Antarctica that New Zealand's endeavours and achievements have been made. The report on honours that recommended the change contained the inaccurate claim that the medal was named after the North Pole. The new medal was formally instituted by Queen Elizabeth II on 1 September 2006.

== See also ==
- List of geography awards
- List of recipients of the Polar Medal

== Bibliography ==
- Poulsom, Neville W. (1968). The White Ribbon: A Medallic Record of British Polar Expeditions. B.A. Seaby, London. ISBN 0-900652-00-4.
- Poulsom, Neville, W, and Myres, J.A.L., (2000). British Polar Exploration and Research: A Historical and Medallic Record with Biographies, 1818–1999. Savannah Publications, London. ISBN 1 902366 05 0.
