= Kim Crosbie =

Scottish Antarctic scientist

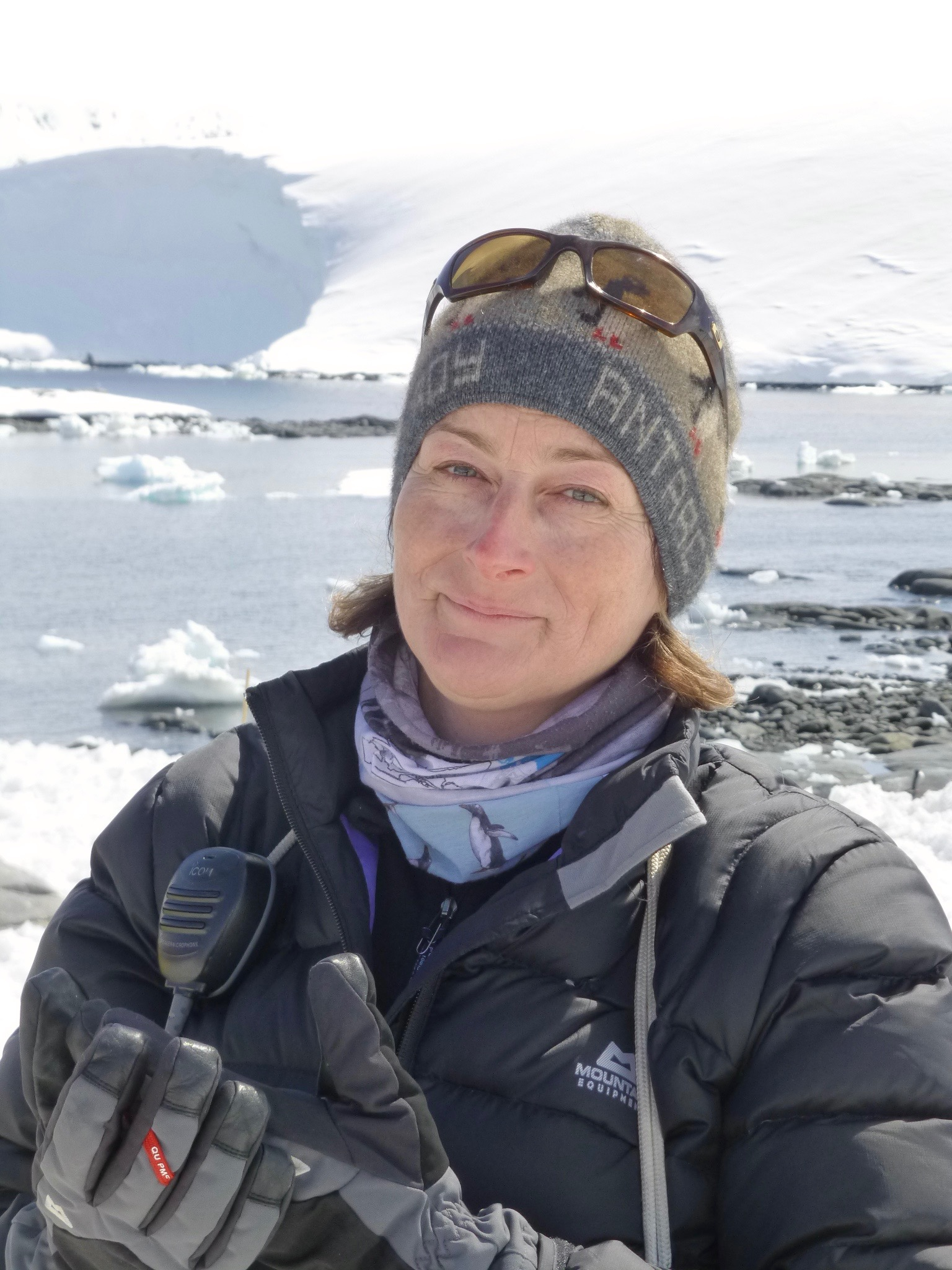
- Education: BSc University of Aberdeen; MPhil & PhD St Catharine's College, Cambridge
- Awards: Polar medal (2016)
- Scientific career
- Workplaces: International Association of Antarctica Tour Operators
- Website: http://iaato.org/the-secretariat

Kim Crosbie FRSGS is a former Executive Director of the International Association of Antarctica Tour Operators (IAATO) and has been working in the polar regions since 1991.

== Early life and education ==
Crosbie is from Edinburgh, Scotland, and she completed her undergraduate degree in Geography at the University of Aberdeen. In 1991 Crosbie began conducting post-Graduate research at the Scott Polar Research Institute (SPRI) at the University of Cambridge, where she gained an M.Phil. in environmental protection in the Canadian Arctic. She then embarked on a PhD that focused on the ecological monitoring and management of visitor sites in the Antarctic. This required three austral summer seasons in primitive conditions at a temporary field camp on Cuverville Island in the Antarctic Peninsula surrounded by some 4,500 breeding pairs of gentoo penguins. During this time, Crosbie spent two seasons as field camp leader at a small temporary field camp.

Following completion of her PhD, Crosbie remained in the field of visitor management, leading expeditions to the Arctic and the Antarctic, primarily onboard expedition vessels, supporting groups of students, film makers, authors, artists and those simply interested in experiencing these unique environments in a sustainable way. She has subsequently described how such Antarctic tourism programmes "enrich a visitor’s experience of Antarctica by getting them involved and contributing to something bigger."

== Career and impact ==
Crosbie's Polar career began in 1991 when she joined the Scott Polar Research Institute, University of Cambridge, as a research student and member of St Catharine's College, Cambridge. Initially working in the Canadian Arctic, she attributes her love of cold places to growing up in Scotland. In 2005, Crosbie joined the International Association of Antarctica Tour Operators (IAATO) as Environmental Manager and subsequently Operations Director before being appointed Executive Director in 2013. As Executive Director, Crosbie was responsible for the Association's strategic planning process, including sustainable tourism growth management strategies. Crosbie directed IAATO's efforts with the Antarctic Treaty Parties and other government bodies relevant to Antarctic tourism, including the International Maritime Organization (for instance, working on the Polar Code, which was adopted in 2014).

Crosbie has published scientific papers and books with a diverse range of scientists and non-governmental representatives. Aspects of this work have contributed to the development of a series of visitor site guidelines both in the Antarctic and the small sub-Antarctic island of South Georgia, as well as guidelines on wildlife and tourism and the use of new technologies such as Unmanned Aerial Vehicles (UAVs). Crosbie has also addressed the topic of citizen science, outreach and education: "This is more of an opportunity than a challenge, through citizen science, we can create ambassadors for the continued protection of Antarctica and build on education efforts through social media and elsewhere.". Currently, Crosbie Chairs the Boards of Noble Caledonia Ltd and Salén Ship Management, is Chair of the Board of Trustees for the United Kingdom Antarctic Heritage Trust and is a trustee for Noble Caledonia Charitable Trust. She previously sat on the Board of the Polar Tourism Guides Association and is a current Member of IAATO's Executive Committee.

== Awards and honors ==
In 2016, Crosbie was awarded the Polar Medal for contributions to knowledge in the Arctic and the Antarctic and was elected to an honorary fellowship of the Royal Scottish Geographical Society (FRSGS).

== Selected works ==
- Chown, S. L.; Lee, J. E.; Hughes, K. A.; Barnes, J.; Barrett, P. J.; Bergstrom, D. M.; Convey, P.; Cowan, D. A.; Crosbie, K. (13 July 2012). "Challenges to the Future Conservation of the Antarctic". Science. 337 (6091): 158–159. Bibcode:2012Sci...337..158C. doi:10.1126/science.1222821. hdl:10019.1/120011. ISSN 0036-8075. PMID 22798586. S2CID 206541691.
- Chown, Steven L.; Huiskes, Ad H. L.; Gremmen, Niek J. M.; Lee, Jennifer E.; Terauds, Aleks; Crosbie, Kim; Frenot, Yves; Hughes, Kevin A.; Imura, Satoshi (27 March 2012). "Continent-wide risk assessment for the establishment of nonindigenous species in Antarctica". Proceedings of the National Academy of Sciences. 109 (13): 4938–4943. Bibcode:2012PNAS..109.4938C. doi:10.1073/pnas.1119787109. ISSN 0027-8424. PMC 3323995. PMID 22393003.
- Poncet, Sally, and Kim Crosbie. A visitor's guide to South Georgia. Princeton University Press, 2012.
- Williams, Rob, and Kim Crosbie. "Antarctic whales and Antarctic tourism." Tourism in Marine Environments 4, no. 2-1 (2007): 195-202.
- Crosbie, Kim. "Monitoring and management of tourist landing sites in the Maritime Antarctic." PhD diss., University of Cambridge, 1998.
