= Mount Provender =

Mountain in Antarctica

Mount Provender (80°23′S 29°55′W) is a conspicuous rock mountain, 900 m, marking the northwest extremity of the Shackleton Range. It was first mapped in 1957 by the Commonwealth Trans-Antarctic Expedition and so named because members of the Commonwealth Trans-Antarctic Expedition established a depot of food and fuel and an airplane camp on the south side of the mountain in 1957 to support sledging parties working in the Shackleton Range.
