= Dream Island (disambiguation) =

Dream Island is an island off Antarctica.

Dream Island may also refer to:

- Dream Island (amusement park), a theme park in Moscow
- Yumenoshima (Dream Island), a district of Tokyo
- Dream Island, part of Al Marjan Island, a man-made archipelago in Ras al-Khaimah
- Dream Island, the island resort from the animated web series Battle for Dream Island
- Dream Island Again, A farm chunk from the animated web series Battle for Dream Island Again

== See also ==
- Island of Dreams (disambiguation)
