= Casey Islands =

Island group in Palmer Archipelago, Antarctica

- Location within Antarctic Peninsula

Geography
- Location: Antarctica
- Coordinates: 64°44′S 64°16′W
- Archipelago: Palmer Archipelago

Administration
- Administered under the Antarctic Treaty System

Demographics
- Population: Uninhabited

The Casey Islands are a group of small islands in the west part of Wylie Bay, south of Cape Monaco, Anvers Island, in the Palmer Archipelago. Fringing islands in this position were charted by the French Antarctic Expedition, 1903–05, led by Jean-Baptiste Charcot. The group was named by the Advisory Committee on Antarctic Names after Casey A. Jones, Jr., cook with the winter party at the nearby U.S. Palmer Station in 1979. He died in an accident, January 9, 1980, while serving at the U.S. South Pole Station.

== See also ==
- List of Antarctic and sub-Antarctic islands
