= List of Battle for Dream Island episodes =

List of web series episodes

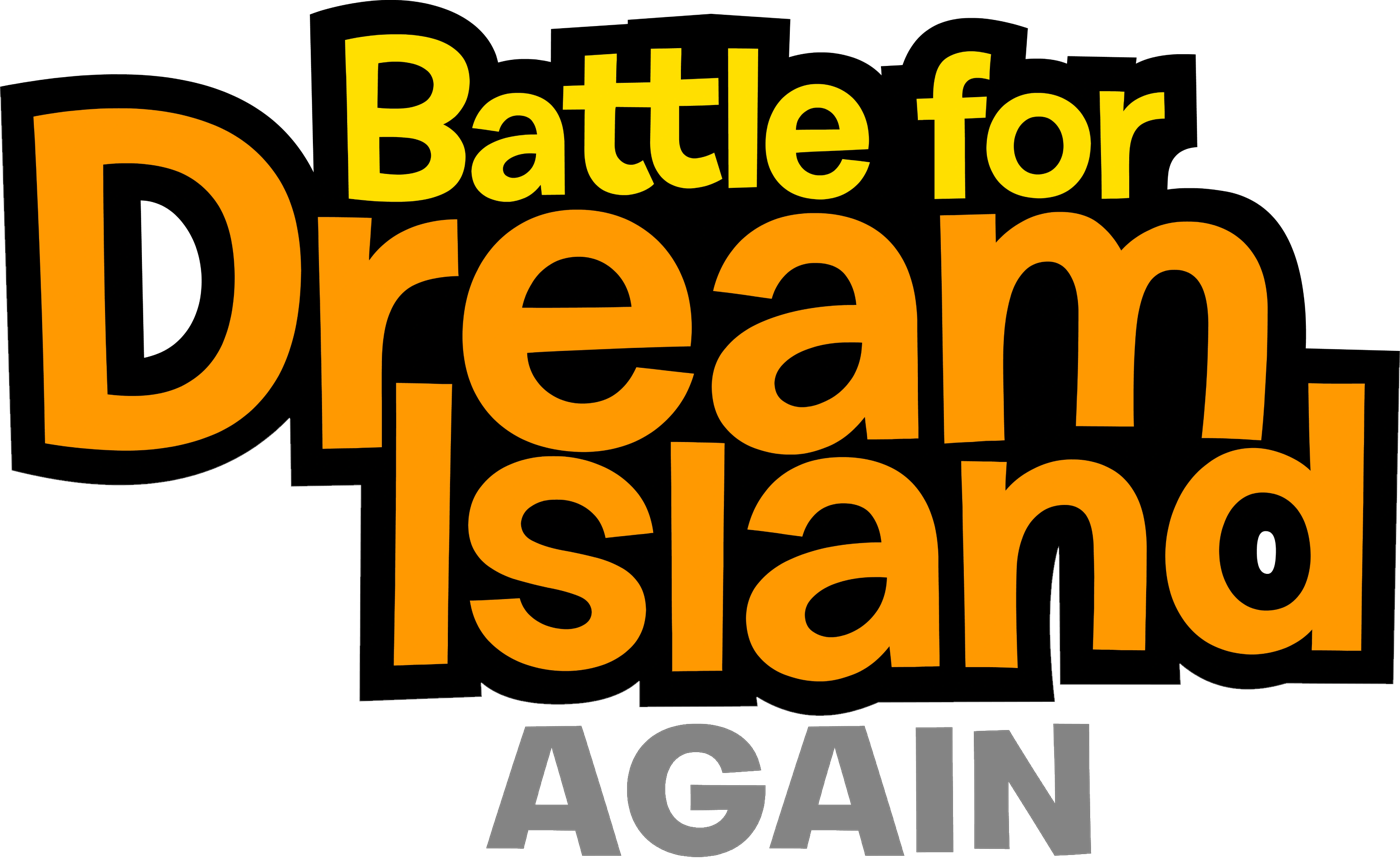
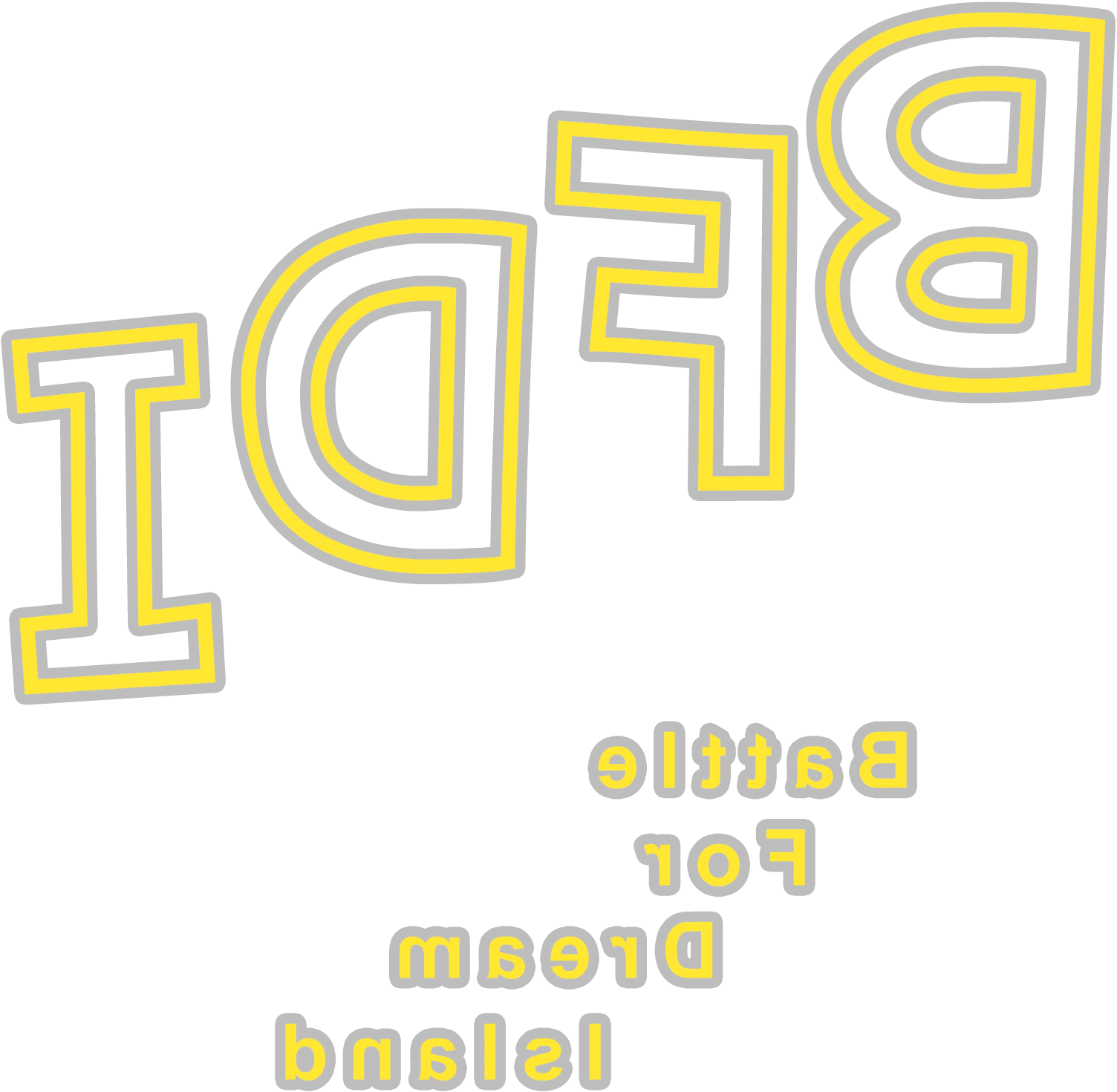
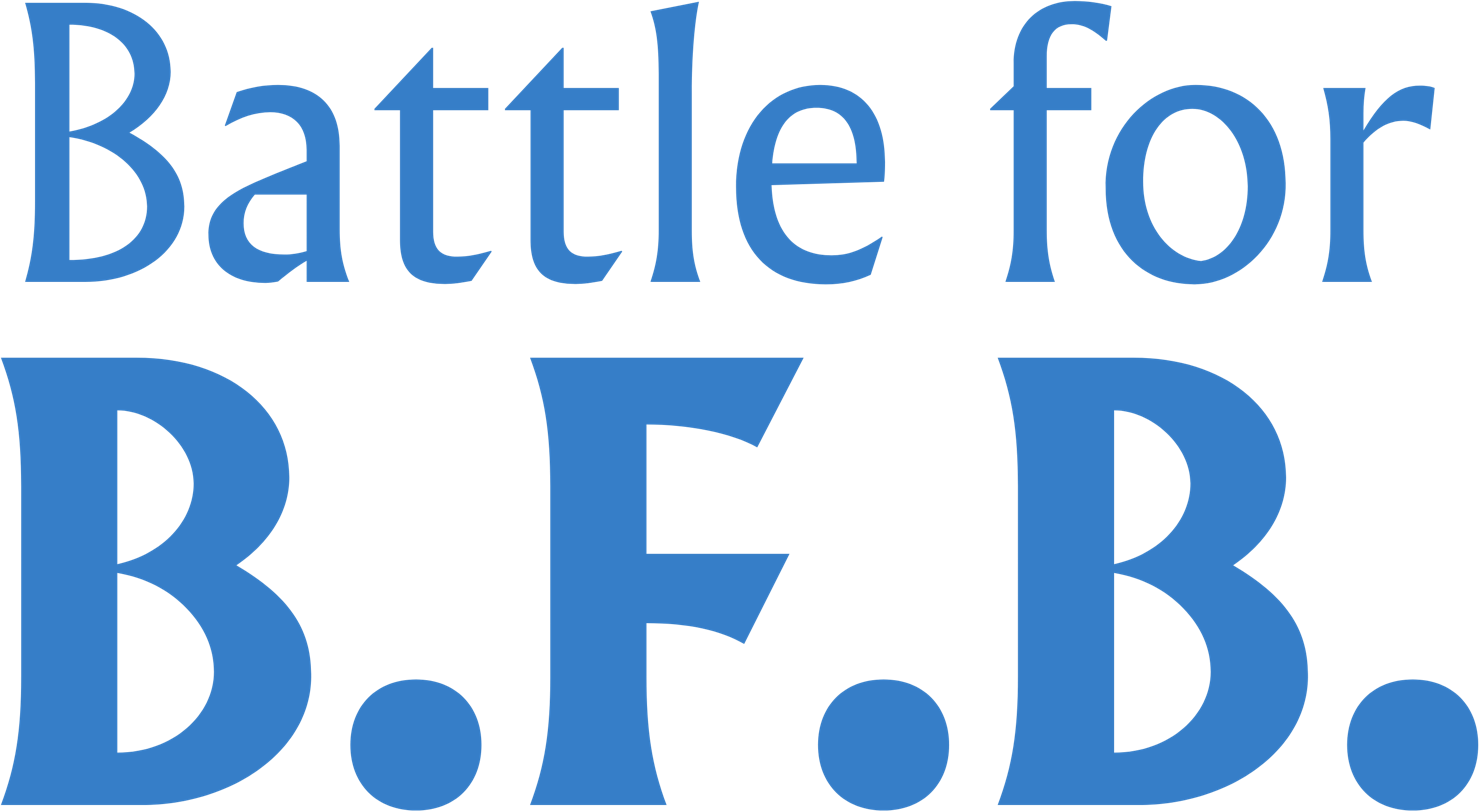
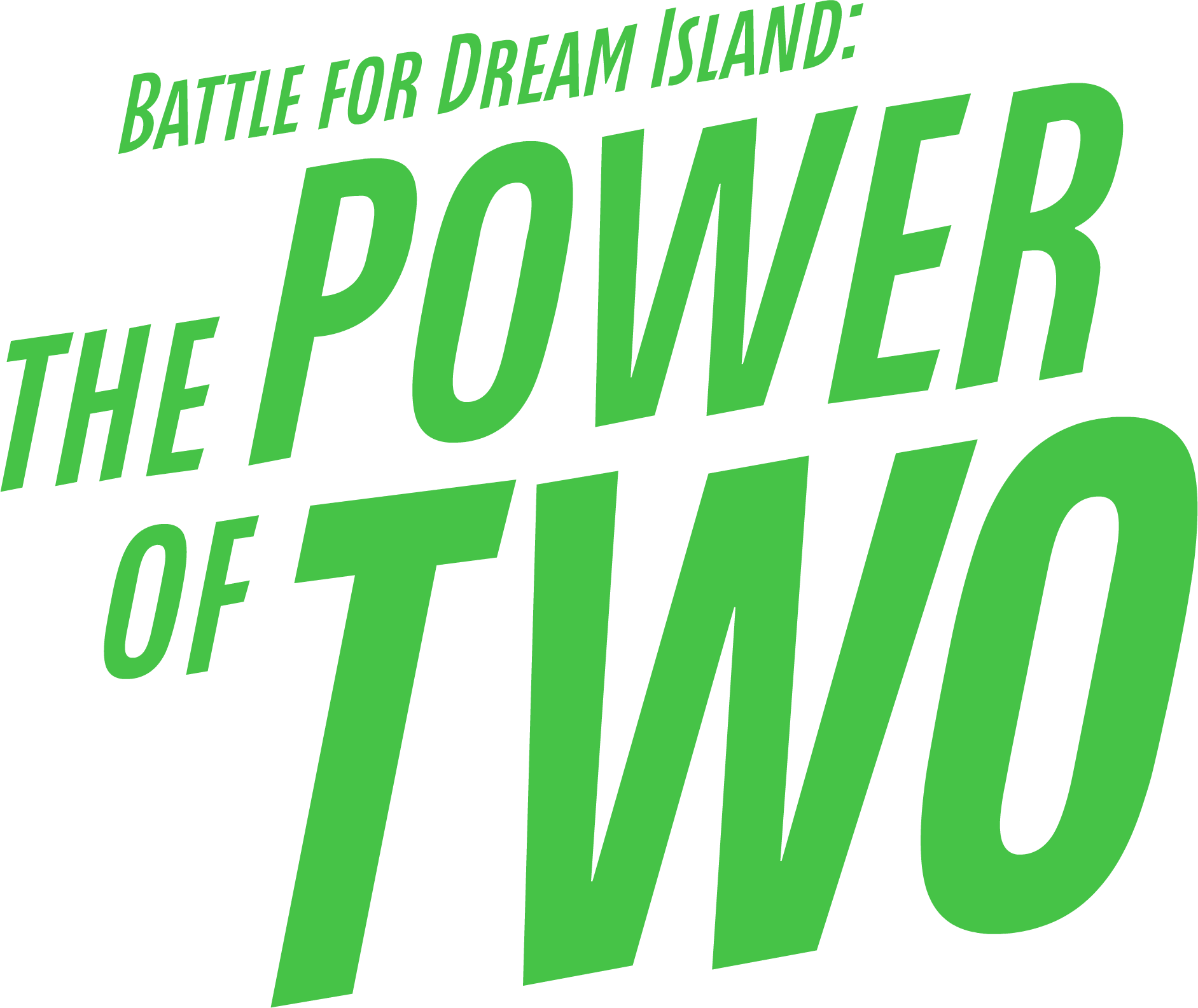
From left to right, top to bottom:
- Battle for Dream Island (season 1)
- Battle for Dream Island Again (season 2)
- dnalsI maerD roF elttaB (season 3)
- Battle for B.F.D.I/B.F.B. (season 4a/4b)
- Battle for Dream Island: The Power of Two (season 5)
- Battle for Dream Island Elsewhere (season 6)

Battle for Dream Island is an American animated web series created by twin brothers Cary and Michael Huang. The first episode was uploaded to YouTube on January 1, 2010. As of 2026, the ongoing series consists of 6 seasons and 116 episodes (released in 121 parts) overall.

== Series overview ==
Season	Title	Episodes		Originally released	
Season	Title	Episodes		First released	Last released
1	Battle for Dream Island	25		January 1, 2010	January 1, 2012
2	Battle for Dream Island Again	25 (Note: BFDIA 5a, 5b, 5c, 5d and 5e are altogether counted as one episode. 5b is a Flash game.)		June 29, 2012	May 18, 2026
3	dnalsI maerD roF elttaB	1 (Note: dnalsI maerD roF elttaB (IDFB) entered an ongoing hiatus after the release of its first episode. It has been confirmed that the season will resume at a later date.)		September 1, 2016	
4	Battle for B.F.D.I.	30	16	November 3, 2017	March 24, 2020
4	Battle for B.F.B.	30	14	April 17, 2020	April 9, 2021
5	Battle for Dream Island: The Power of Two	25		January 10, 2021	TBA
6	Battle for Dream Island Elsewhere	10		January 1, 2026	March 13, 2026

== Season 1: Battle for Dream Island (2010–2012) ==
No. in season	Title	Directed by	Written by	Original release date
1	"Take the Plunge" (Note: This episode released in two parts on the same day, BFDI 1a and BFDI 1b; both share the "Take the Plunge" name.)	Cary Huang & Michael Huang	Cary Huang	January 1, 2010
Part 1: On the fictional continent of Goiky, twenty anthropomorphic objects (Blocky, Bubble, Coiny, Eraser, Firey, Flower, Golf Ball, Ice Cube, Leafy, Match, Needle, Pen, Pencil, Pin, Rocky, Snowball, Spongy, Teardrop, Tennis Ball, and Woody) are interacting with each other in a grassland. A dark gray speaker box called the Announcer descends from the sky and announces the existence of Dream Island, an island designed to be the ultimate paradise, and that whoever owns the island can decide who is allowed onto it. He starts a contest for the island with the twenty objects as contestants. The first challenge is to see who can stay on a balance beam the longest. Two of the objects, Leafy and Pin, win the first contest and get to organize the teams of the competition. Part 2: Leafy and Pin start choosing the other contestants to join their teams: the Squishy Cherries (Note: Consists of Blocky, Bubble, Eraser, Firey, Match, Pen, Pencil, Pin, Spongy and Woody.) and the Squashy Grapes. (Note: Consists of Coiny, Flower, Golf Ball, Ice Cube, Leafy, Needle, Rocky, Snowball, Teardrop and Tennis Ball.) The next contest is a race to make a boat and row it to the finish line across the Goiky Canal, which the Squishy Cherries win.
2	"Barriers and Pitfalls"	Cary Huang & Michael Huang	Cary Huang	February 1, 2010
Because Pin won the challenge for her team, she obtains a "Win Token", which allows her to halve her votes during the elimination ceremony, called Cake at Stake. Said ceremony is attended by the losing team's members. They get cake slices until there are none left, revealing the eliminated contestant, who will be treated with a vaguely described "TLC". The cake for Cake at Stake is a strawberry cake (Also known as a "Regular cake"). Flower is eliminated with 4 votes. The contest is an obstacle course, won by the Squashy Grapes. Needle obtains a Win Token for finishing the challenge first.
3	"Are You Smarter Than a Snowball?"	Cary Huang & Michael Huang	Cary Huang	March 1, 2010
The cake for Cake at Stake is key lime pie, and Spongy is eliminated with four votes. The contest is a quiz, which is initially won by the Squishy Cherries until it is revealed that Blocky and Pen cheated, giving the victory to the Squashy Grapes. Golf Ball obtains a Win Token for having the highest score on the test.
4	"Sweet Tooth"	Cary Huang & Michael Huang	Cary Huang	April 1, 2010
The cake for Cake at Stake is ice, and Blocky is eliminated with six votes. The contest consists of two parts: to bake cakes that will be rated by Announcer, Flower, and a die, and to eat one hundred chocolate balls. The Squashy Grapes win in a literal tiebreaker, and Pin gains her second Win Token for having the highest scoring cake.
5	"Bridge Crossing"	Cary Huang & Michael Huang	Cary Huang	May 1, 2010
The cake for Cake at Stake is an ice cream cake, and Woody is eliminated with 9 votes. The "TLC" makes its first physical appearance as a giant metal box called the Tiny Loser Chamber, and Woody is sent there. The contest is to cross a bridge. No one does, so a tiebreaker occurs, which the Squashy Grapes win. No one receives a Win Token.
6	"Power of Three"	Cary Huang & Michael Huang	Cary Huang	June 1, 2010
The cake for Cake at Stake is cupcakes, and Pin is eliminated with 5 votes. The teams are temporarily split into five teams of three, and the contest is to get across three islands. On island 1, the contestants are tasked with looking through safes to find rafts and paddles. Island 2 has ten keys hanging from poles, which are used to unlock a locked building on island 3. However, five of the keys are fake, forcing their holders to go back to island 2 and get another key. Coiny, Ice Cube, and Needle lose the contest, and Eraser, Firey, and Pen all get Win Tokens for finishing first.
7	"Puzzling Mysteries"	Cary Huang & Michael Huang	Cary Huang	July 1, 2010
The cake for Cake at Stake is key lime pie again, and Needle is eliminated with 12 votes, even after halving her votes to 6 with a win token. Because the TLC does not close properly, the Announcer decides that the winners get to take a contestant from the losing team, with no one getting eliminated. The contest is to solve a jigsaw puzzle, won by the Squashy Grapes. They choose Firey to switch to their team. No one receives a Win Token in this episode.
8	"Cycle of Life"	Cary Huang & Michael Huang	Cary Huang	August 1, 2010
The contest is a race where each contestant has to carry one of their other team members, except for the last contestant, who does not carry anyone. The Announcer also promises a prize for the winning team, and that no one is eliminated again. Because the Squashy Grapes have more members than the Squishy Cherries at this point, five of them are chosen by the wheel to participate: Firey, Golf Ball, Ice Cube, Leafy, and Rocky. The Squashy Grapes win, and their prize is that they get to have an eliminated player on their team. No one receives a Win Token in this episode.
9	"Insectophobe's Nightmare"	Cary Huang & Michael Huang	Cary Huang & Michael Huang	September 1, 2010
Beginning with this episode, the show would feature fan-made recommended characters from viewers, with Bomby being the first under this title. The cake for Cake at Stake is a regular cake. Blocky rejoins the game on the Squashy Grapes with 8 votes, which are then split into the Squashy Grapes (Blocky, Ice Cube, Leafy, Snowball and Teardrop) and Another Name (Coiny, Firey, Golf Ball, Rocky and Tennis Ball). Blocky receives a Win Token for rejoining. A new elimination system is introduced, in which the two most voted contestants from the team that was last are voted on by the team that placed first; one contestant will join the winning team, and the other will be eliminated. The contest is a six-legged race, in which Squishy Cherries place first and Squashy Grapes in last.
10	"Crybaby!"	Cary Huang & Michael Huang	Cary Huang	October 1, 2010
The cake for Cake at Stake is modelling clay, with the bottom two being Teardrop and Snowball, at 5 and 18 votes respectively. Teardrop is eliminated from a 3-2 vote, with Snowball being moved to the Squishy Cherries. The contest, which is for each team to fill their tub as much as they can with tears, ends in a tie. The tiebreaker is a skiing contest in which the Squishy Cherries and Another Name are rolled into snowballs, needing an additional tiebreaker; a handstanding contest, in which the Squishy Cherries win and Another Name lose. Eraser gains a Win Token for handstanding the longest.
11	"Lofty"	Cary Huang & Michael Huang	Cary Huang	November 1, 2010
The cake for Cake at Stake is an imaginary cake, with the bottom two being Golf Ball, at 12 votes (6 after using her win token), and Rocky, at 15. Golf Ball is eliminated from a 0-6 vote, with Rocky moved to the Squishy Cherries. The contest is try to stay up in the air with balloons, which the Squashy Grapes win and Another Name lose. No one receives a Win Token in this episode.
12	"A Leg Up in the Race"	Cary Huang & Michael Huang	Cary Huang	December 1, 2010
The Cake at Stake has no cake, with the bottom two being Tennis Ball and Coiny at 22 and 30 votes, respectively. Leafy picks Tennis Ball for the Squashy Grapes, eliminating Coiny. Announcer then breaks up the teams. The contest is to climb ladders. Everyone except for Tennis Ball succeeds in reaching the top. With the removal of teams, the point system is introduced. The bottom third of the leaderboard go to the Cake at Stake. Win Tokens are also removed, and in exchange, Firey, Pen, Blocky, and Eraser earn points. The contestants also gain points from the contest, and lose points for each vote they have received at past Cake at Stake ceremonies.
13	"Don't Lose Your Marbles"	Cary Huang & Michael Huang	Cary Huang	January 1, 2011
The cake for Cake at Stake is fish, with the bottom third being Snowball, Bubble, Rocky, and Tennis Ball. Snowball is eliminated with 47 votes. The contest is to find and bring a red ball to the Announcer. There are also maroon balls, which subtract points instead of adding them.
14	"Half a Loaf Is Better Than None"	Cary Huang & Michael Huang	Cary Huang	February 1, 2011
The cake for Cake at Stake is fruitcake, with the bottom third being Match, Ice Cube, Rocky, and Tennis Ball. Match is eliminated with 66 votes. The eliminated contestants get a contest to carry loaves to their basket until the deadline, won by Spongy, who rejoins the competition and gains 38 points, one for each loaf of bread carried. The next contest is to jump over obstacles on a conveyor belt. Blocky and Bubble last the longest.
15	"Vomitaco"	Cary Huang & Michael Huang	Cary Huang	March 1, 2011
The cake for Cake at Stake is nickels, with the bottom third being Ice Cube, Leafy, Eraser, and Firey. Eraser is eliminated with 99 votes. There are two contests: to stay on floating islands in a giant barf bag, and to make a taco rated by the eliminated contestants. Pencil lasts the longest in the barf bag, and Spongy's taco receives the most likes from the eliminated contestants.
16	"Bowling, Now with Explosions!"	Cary Huang & Michael Huang	Cary Huang	April 1, 2011
The cake for Cake at Stake is an explosive blueberry pie, with the bottom third being Pen, Bubble, and Rocky. Pen is eliminated with 144 votes. The contest is bowling, and everyone is sent to Cake at Stake besides Firey, who earned immunity by bowling a strike. Uniquely in this episode, contestants that knocked down any pins choose how they would like to subtract points instead of adding them.
17	"The Reveal"	Cary Huang & Michael Huang	Cary Huang	May 1, 2011
The cake for Cake at Stake is knives, and Blocky is eliminated with 112 votes. The contest is to throw and catch frisbees as a pair, with a penalty if the pair does not finish before sunset. Leafy and Ice Cube fail to finish before the sunset. Announcer reveals that the contestants will vote on who is eliminated, and the viewers will instead vote on one of thirty fan-made characters ("recommended characters") to join the competition. The characters eligible for entry are 8-Ball, Balloony, Barf Bag, Basketball, Bell, Bomby, Book, Clock, Cloudy, David, Dora, Eggy, Evil Leafy, Fanny, Fries, Grassy, Marker, Naily, Nickel, Nonexisty, Pie, Pillow, Remote, Robot Flower, Roboty, Ruby, Saw, Taco, Tree and TV.
18	"Reveal Novum"	Cary Huang & Michael Huang	Cary Huang	June 1, 2011
The eliminated contestants plot their escape from the TLC, but the Announcer appears and tells them to stop planning. The cake for the first Cake at Stake is a cracker, and Leafy and Tennis Ball tie for elimination with two votes. The tiebreaker is to jump over a gap, eliminating Tennis Ball who falls. The cake for the second Cake at Stake is a yellow tomato. David joins the game as the recommended character with 102 votes. The other recommended characters are sent to the Locker of Losers (LOL), a huge, navy blue box similar to the TLC, with a lock to prevent attempts of escape. The scoreboard gets downgraded, so it can only hold two-digit numbers. The contest is a staring contest, won by Pencil. While the staring contest is underway, the eliminated contestants attempt to escape the TLC, which backfires and they nearly drown in the river until they are saved by the sunrise. When points are given out, Pencil's score overflows, and she ends up in the bottom third.
19	"Rescission"	Cary Huang & Michael Huang	Cary Huang	July 1, 2011
The cake for Cake at Stake is shovels covered in mud. The bottom three are Spongy, Firey, and Pencil; Pencil is eliminated with 259 votes. From this point on, points no longer exist; contestants now obtain immunity by winning challenges. The contest is to race on unicycles, won by Bubble, Rocky, and Firey. For winning first, Bubble is allowed to choose another contestant to have immunity, choosing Leafy.
20	"Gardening Hero"	Cary Huang & Michael Huang	Cary Huang	August 1, 2011
The Announcer moves the competition to outer space due to "budget cuts". The cake for Cake at Stake is ice cream cake again, with Spongy, Ice Cube, and David up for voting. David is eliminated with 331 votes. The contest is to get in a spaceship and shoot lasers at other contestants. Bubble wins, and once again picks Leafy to have immunity alongside her. Announcer invites the viewers to vote on an eliminated contestant to rejoin the game, while the non-immune contestants will be voted on by the previously eliminated.
21	"The Glistening"	Cary Huang & Michael Huang	Cary Huang	September 1, 2011
The contestants return to Earth, using Spongy as spaceship fuel. There is no Cake at Stake item; Ice Cube is the most voted to be eliminated. Flower rejoins the game with 205 votes. The contest is a long jump competition, won by Leafy, although she gives up her immunity to Spongy because she feels bad for having used him as fuel.
22	"Don't Pierce My Flesh"	Cary Huang & Michael Huang	Cary Huang	October 1, 2011
The Announcer gets crushed by Spongy, so Firey and Flower bring out their personal speaker boxes to host. The cake for Cake at Stake is "yoylecake" (a cake composed of fictional "yoyleberries", which makes bodies turn into metal when eaten), and Rocky is eliminated with 319 votes. The contest is to escape a volcano. The contestants all tie, so Firey and Flower's Speaker Boxes do a beauty contest. They declare their creators as the winners, giving Firey and Flower immunity.
23	"Hurtful!"	Cary Huang & Michael Huang	Cary Huang	November 1, 2011
The Announcer gets recovered, more speaker boxes show up, and the cake for Cake at Stake is cheese slices. Spongy is eliminated with 432 votes. The contest is to complete every previous contest in order. Near the end, Bubble and Leafy argue about their friendship, and then Flower kills Leafy. Bubble then kills Flower and proceeds to win immunity. Firey is given a penalty (holding a sign asking the viewers to vote for him) for performing poorly during the challenge.
24	"Insectophobe's Nightmare 2"	Cary Huang & Michael Huang	Cary Huang	December 1, 2011
The Announcer sells the recovery centers due to "budget cuts", and then abruptly cancels the show after seeing that they once again received a fewer number of votes. Bugs begin to infest the area, killing all of the contestants except for David, who is immune to them. The Announcer continues the competition with clones of David posing as the contestants. The Cake at Stake is red velvet cake, and Flower is eliminated with 524 votes. At that point, the contestants suddenly come back, all having faked their deaths. The Announcer invites the viewers to vote who should win Dream Island. He then buys new recovery centers for the final 3 and himself with Firey's life savings.
25	"Return of the Hang Glider"	Cary Huang & Michael Huang	Cary Huang & Michael Huang	January 1, 2012
The cake for the final Cake at Stake is a "Grand Cake", made up of all the previous cakes. The released eliminated contestants have an opinion vote for which contestant they would like to win Dream Island. With 406 out of 870 votes, Firey wins the cake and Dream Island. When choosing who gets to enter, Firey lets everyone in except for runner-up Leafy, who buys Dream Island from the Announcer in retaliation. After Bubble calls out Flower for her behavior, the latter destroys the recovery centers and pops the former. She and Woody are then killed by a UFO. The Announcer leaves on the UFO with his friends back to their home planet. When the contestants find out about Leafy stealing Dream Island, they threaten to kill her via Flower's announcer crusher. Before she is crushed, Firey saves Leafy using a hang glider, telling her that he values their friendship more than the island, as they fly away towards the sunset.

== Season 2: Battle for Dream Island Again (2012–2026) ==
No. in season	Title	Directed by	Written by	Original release date
1	"Yeah, Who? I Wanna Know"	Cary Huang & Michael Huang	Cary Huang & Michael Huang	June 29, 2012
Leafy escapes into Yoyleland (where previously-seen "yoyleberries" come from) using a map. Sixty-two contestants are eligible for entry, including the 20 original contestants, the 30 recommended characters from "The Reveal", and 12 additional characters: Black Hole, Bottle, Bracelety, Cake, Donut, Firey Jr., Gaty, Gelatin, Lightning, Lollipop, Puffball and Yellow Face. 22 of these contestants qualify. Originally, the contestants that were supposed to join were Bubble, Coiny, Firey, Flower, Golf Ball, Ice Cube, Leafy, Needle, Match, Pencil, Pin, Rocky, Spongy, Teardrop and Tennis Ball, alongside newcomers Bomby, Donut, Dora, Fries, Gelatin, Nickel and Ruby. The absent Bubble, Flower and Leafy are disqualified and replaced with additional newcomers Book, Puffball and Yellow Face. The remaining 40 who failed to debut are sent to the Tiny Loser Chamber. The contestants quarrel over who should be on what team, ending with Coiny, Donut and Pin being on one smaller team and the rest on one larger team. The challenge is a game of tug-of-war, which the smaller team quickly loses. Instead of voting in the comments, viewers can like or dislike a contestant's video, with the most-liked getting to spin a prize wheel and the most-disliked getting eliminated.
2	"Get Digging"	Cary Huang & Michael Huang	Cary Huang & Michael Huang	August 1, 2012
The smaller team is named W.O.A.H. Bunch, (Note: Short for "Wheel Ooze a Hole Bunch", a play on "we'll lose a whole bunch".) and the larger team is dubbed Team No-Name. Coiny wins the prize with 448 likes, and Donut is eliminated with 573 dislikes. The Tiny Loser Chamber, with the newly eliminated Donut, is then put inside the Locker of Losers. Coiny's prize is yoyleseeds. Teardrop is forced to switch to W.O.A.H. Bunch, and the contest is to make "yoylestew", won by said team.
3	"Insectophobe's Nightmare 3"	Cary Huang & Michael Huang	Cary Huang & Michael Huang	August 15, 2012
Puffball wins the prize with 387 likes, and Dora is eliminated with 347 dislikes. Puffball's prize is a personal speaker box, which becomes the host. Needle is forced to switch to W.O.A.H. Bunch, and the contest is to kill the bugs in the team's glass box, won by Team No-Name.
4	"Zeeky Boogy Doog"	Cary Huang & Michael Huang	Cary Huang & Michael Huang	November 1, 2012
Teardrop wins the prize with 502 likes, though is also eliminated with 440 dislikes. Teardrop's prize was to choose between immunity into the final 15 or a "Hand-Powered Recovery Center" (HPRC), which can recover any contestant via turning a large hand crank; she chooses the HPRC. Bomby and Yellow Face switch to W.O.A.H. Bunch. They soon remember no one knows what happened to Dream Island after Leafy stole it from Firey when Ruby mentions it. The contest is to build a new Dream Island, which will be dubbed "Dream Island Again" and will be the season's prize. Team No-Name goes to Golf Ball's Underground Factory, and she uses "Dream Sauce" to create her own Dream Island Again. This catches the attention of Coiny, prompting him to throw Bomby into the factory and destroy the island. W.O.A.H. Bunch wins the contest, with their "Dream Island Again" being a poorly-made farm.
5a	"Get in the Van"	Cary Huang & Michael Huang	Cary Huang & Michael Huang	January 2, 2013
Leafy tries to reunite with Firey, but he denies having known Leafy. Pin accidentally throws a knife at Puffball Speaker Box, who is replaced by the Firey Speaker Box. The Cake at Stake is chunks of Donut's corpse. Puffball wins the prize with 424 likes, and Match is eliminated with 426 dislikes, but Pencil saves her from being sent away. Puffball's prize is to choose a contestant to have their limbs removed, and she chooses Pin as revenge for stabbing her speaker box. Nickel and Spongy switch to W.O.A.H. Bunch, and Book, Ice Cube, Pencil, and Ruby make their own team, named FreeSmart. Bubble and Match join as honorary members. The contest is to reach the summit of the far-away Yoyle Mountain, in Yoyleland. FreeSmart gets in their own personal vehicle, the FreeSmart Van, Team No-Name gets on Puffball, and W.O.A.H. Bunch travel on foot. Gelatin pushes Golf Ball, Tennis Ball, and Rocky off to make space, and they are pursued by Evil Leafy (a red, hostile version of Leafy), until they are cornered near the "Evil Canyon". FreeSmart, Golf Ball, Tennis Ball and Rocky are all swallowed by Evil Leafy.
5b	"BFDIA 5b"	Cary Huang & Michael Huang	Cary Huang & Michael Huang	February 11, 2013
This part of the episode is a puzzle-platform game using Adobe Flash. The FreeSmart members, trapped inside Evil Leafy after the events of BFDIA 5a, traverse through and escape her body using different abilities. A remake of the episode/game is set to release in 2027.
5c	"No More Snow!"	Cary Huang & Michael Huang	Cary Huang & Michael Huang	April 14, 2013
Firey and Gelatin fall off of Puffball and get eaten by Evil Leafy. Book and Ruby successfully escape Evil Leafy, with the other FreeSmart members missing or dead. Evil Leafy pursues them, followed by Fries and Puffball, and Book and Ruby crush them with an anvil, killing everyone still inside of Evil Leafy and destroying the HPRC. Pin gets stuck in glue and is crushed by a tree. The rest of W.O.A.H. Bunch falls into the Evil Canyon, so Coiny says Spongy should jump onto the spikes at the bottom so the other team members can land onto him. Needle slaps everyone out, but is stuck with Spongy, so W.O.A.H. Bunch sets the two on fire in hopes of recovering her later. The remaining FreeSmart and W.O.A.H. Bunch members meet up and Firey Speaker Box brings out a "Hand-Powered HPRC creator" (HPHPRCC). They crank the handle until the HPRC is created. Match and Ice Cube return, but Match uses Ice Cube to douse her flame.
5d	"It's a Monster"	Cary Huang & Michael Huang	Cary Huang & Michael Huang	July 2, 2013
The FreeSmart and W.O.A.H. Bunch members are still cranking even after 78 days. Finally, an HPRC comes out, and they recover their dead team members while the HPHPRCC self-destructs. The FreeSmart members get in a new van, the FreeSmart SuperVan, while W.O.A.H. Bunch also recovers Puffball, so they can make her fly them to Yoyleland. This fails and Puffball recovers Team No-Name, and Gelatin freezes W.O.A.H. Bunch with "Freeze Juice". FreeSmart then steals the HPRC.
5e	"The Long-lost Yoyle City"	Cary Huang & Michael Huang	Cary Huang & Michael Huang	August 2, 2013
W.O.A.H. Bunch unfreezes and continue forward. Team No-Name is flying over Davidland, an area consisting of thousands of David clones, on Puffball. Meanwhile, FreeSmart is in the FreeSmart Supervan in Yoyleland, and they arrive at Yoyleland's signature landmark, the abandoned but well-preserved Yoyle City. Ruby accidentally glues the HPRC to the ground, and Pencil gets trapped by a fish's tongue. FreeSmart uses a saw to kill her, and they recover her using the HPRC. FreeSmart and Team No-Name reach Yoyle Mountain, where they are met by Firey Speaker Box. FreeSmart gets to the summit first. Firey Speaker Box realizes that Match is not in the TLC, and sends her there. While Team No-Name is about to reach the summit, Puffball, wanting to win a Cake at Stake prize again, betrays her team members by dropping them to be eaten by the fish, making Team No-Name lose as W.O.A.H. Bunch reaches the summit.
6	"Well Rested"	Cary Huang & Michael Huang	Cary Huang	September 1, 2023 (Note: This episode was originally going to release in 2013 but was cancelled due to production troubles. It was remade in 2023, exactly a decade after its intended release.)
Puffball is eliminated at Cake at Stake. Before the challenge, Rocky, who was on Team No-Name, is convinced to switch to W.O.A.H. Bunch, much to the former team's dismay. The challenge is to find a place for the team members to sleep. The challenge results in team W.O.A.H. Bunch being unable to sleep due to being chased by Evil Leafy for the entire night.
7	"Intruder Alert"	Cary Huang & Michael Huang	Cary Huang	October 1, 2023
Ruby catches a Yoylite meteorite, which is coveted by Tennis Ball and Golf Ball for its rarity and power. Rocky is eliminated at Cake at Stake. The contestants eliminate TV as well when he fails to make a new Cake at Stake song, but he takes the key to the LOL with him, and Rocky bounces off the LOL's lid. Because the key is now inside it, the Tiny Loser Chamber (with the failed debuters and eliminated contestants inside it) is now locked with no way to open it. The challenge is to build a replacement for the Tiny Loser Chamber which will be used to store the future eliminated contestants. Tennis Ball instructs Firey and Gelatin to switch to FreeSmart for one challenge in order to get the Yoylite. As a result, FreeSmart loses the challenge due to Firey and Gelatin not telling them what the challenge is. The one surviving replacement for the TLC is a rather shoddy-looking structure, dubbed the Weak Trembling Fortress (WTF). Rocky is placed in the WTF.
8	"Meaty"	Cary Huang & Michael Huang	Cary Huang	November 13, 2023
Firey is eliminated at Cake at Stake and sent to the WTF. As a result, Firey Speaker Box becomes too sad to host. Puffball Speaker Box is brought back to host. The challenge is to paint a replica of the Eiffel Tower. W.O.A.H. Bunch loses due to Gelatin giving glasses meant for Yellow Face to Puffball Speaker Box which makes W.O.A.H. Bunch's paint color, purple, look yellow. Note: Zach Kornfeld guest stars in this episode.
9	"Catch These Hands"	Anthony Acedo, Cary Huang, Michael Huang & Joseph Pak	Cary Huang	January 31, 2024
The Cake at Stake starts in FreeSmart's "Clubhouse of Awesomeness" at the top of the replica Eiffel Tower, with the prize being a paper airplane ticket out of the clubhouse, and Yellow Face is eliminated after Purple Face, his nemesis, steals his win token printer, and Yellow Face imprisons him in a acid-proof metal box. Gelatin switches back to Team No-Name. The challenge is a time-based game of charades, where contestants have to answer correctly before their teammate is crushed by a trash compactor. Team No-Name is out due to them running out of players first. Contestants who were killed are sent to the underworld, where they are turned into realistic versions of themselves, though they are eventually recovered and turned back later on.
10	"Taste the Sweetness"	Anthony Acedo, Cary Huang, Michael Huang & Joseph Pak	Cary Huang	March 1, 2024
Gelatin is eliminated at Cake at Stake and sent to the WTF. Amazed by Ice Cube's "beautiful face" (her doing her "ugly face" (her rapidly moving her tongue across her face) whilst upside down), almost all the contestants, sans Fries, switch to FreeSmart, now called the "Beautiful Face Devotion Institute". (Note: Fries' team is just called "Fries". This also goes for any future instances where he is solo.) The challenge is to sell the most ice cream before the first signs of winter appear. Fries wins the challenge. Note: Zach Kornfeld and TomSka guest star in this episode.
11	"Lots of Mud"	Anthony Acedo, Cary Huang, Michael Huang & Joseph Pak	Cary Huang & Joseph Pak	April 1, 2024
Ice Cube gets the challenge reward, which is to remove a contestant's face of her choice. Ice Cube chooses Pin as revenge from stopping her and Book from attending Match's dance party, effectively rendering her completely insentient. Spongy gets eliminated, but not before accidentally killing Puffball Speaker Box. Golf Ball causes the Beautiful Face Devotion Institute to divide by turning Ice Cube upward, with everyone returning the teams to what they were before "Taste the Sweetness". Flower, who was recovered, hosts this episode, making the challenge to remove the most petals off of her head. W.O.A.H. Bunch wins the challenge and FreeSmart goes up for elimination.
12	"Insectophobe's Nightmare 4"	Anthony Acedo, Cary Huang, Michael Huang & Joseph Pak	Cary Huang & Joseph Pak	May 16, 2024
Ruby gets the challenge reward (a shrink ray), but does not know who to choose, so she chooses to shrink the immobile Pin to the size of a real-world pushpin. Ice Cube is eliminated and sent to the WTF. Needle is forced to switch to FreeSmart, and Fries goes solo once more. Since Spongy was too heavy to be launched to the WTF, he ends up crushing Flower. A swarm of bugs replace her and host the next challenge, "Bug-filled Dodgeball Insanity". Ruby finds her thirty-five sisters hiding in a bug hive, who reveal their resentment towards her as she was the only one among them to join BFDI. All 36 decide to compromise by joining the game as "Ruby". FreeSmart wins the challenge and immunity. Note: Kevin MacLeod guest stars in this episode.
13	"Well, Look Who It Is!"	Anthony Acedo, Cary Huang & Joseph Pak	Anthony Acedo, Cary Huang & Joseph Pak	July 18, 2024
The four members of the WTF leave the area to visit and explore Yoyle City, encountering various pieces of technology. Guided by Pin's voice, Coiny puts Pin in the trash compactor and digs to the underworld in an attempt to restore Pin to her full self, but despite pulling her out, the plan fails. Interactions between the TLC inhabitants are shown throughout, including them fleeing from seeing Coiny pull up Pin, getting hit by an "improvement laser beam" fired by the WTF inhabitants that changes some of their looks and also makes Rocky now also vomit acid, and a call to buy five islands. Without anybody noticing, Firey revives Leafy with the HPRC before quickly running off, unbeknownst to her.
14	"PointyPointyPointy ♫" (Note: Originally published as "You're a Filthy Friend".)	Anthony Acedo, Cary Huang, Michael Huang & Joseph Pak	Cary Huang, Michael Huang & Joseph Pak	August 10, 2024
The Cake at Stake is started by the bugs, but FreeSmart kills them using Spongy, so the TLC inhabitants host the next challenge. With the help of Coiny, Pin regains her face and size as a reward. However, she does not get her limbs back, instead receiving a cable-powered mech suit. Golf Ball is eliminated and sent to the WTF. The challenge is to get to a bunk bed at the top of the TLC inhabitants' islands, in which they have missions assigned to complete in order to pass to the next island, though Evil Leafy is in pursuit. On the final island, which is to sing a song so as to impress Puffball, "Ruby", who is teamed with Book, secretly records Pin's song, modifies it, and plays it into the microphone. Having had enough of the disrespect she endured from FreeSmart in the past episodes, Pin sends a surge of electricity through her cable, which travels up the central beam and strikes "Ruby" and Book, putting them up for elimination.
15	"Spore Day"	Anthony Acedo, Cary Huang, Michael Huang & Joseph Pak	Anthony Acedo, Cary Huang, Michael Huang & Joseph Pak	October 4, 2024
Ruby is eliminated and sent to the WTF, though her sisters also have to be sent as well. The final nine are temporarily divided into three new teams of equal size: The Hearts, The Stars, and The Quasi-Rhombicosidodecahedrons. Each team competes to get their respective team members inside of a birdhouse lined with lead paint. The cast eventually ends up shrinking each other and the birdhouse down to the atomic level. The Hearts win by using lead atoms to stun the other teams.
16	"Respect to the Wicked"	Joseph Pak	Anthony Acedo, Cary Huang & Joseph Pak	December 1, 2024
The cast returns to their original sizes, while Balloony ties up the rest of the TLC inhabitants and declares himself host. Bomby is eliminated and sent to the WTF. As Needle's allegiance is split between FreeSmart and W.O.A.H. Bunch, she tries to play for both teams simultaneously. In the challenge, the contestants are tasked with hiding an item and finding their competitors' items in order to tag them. Needle's split allegiances cause her to be up for elimination twice, while Nickel wins the challenge.
17	"Start the Shift"	Michael Huang & Joseph Pak	Michael Huang & Joseph Pak & Sam Thornbury	January 1, 2025
After the contestants try to use Spongy to destroy the TLC when they get tired of Balloony, which fails, Balloony drives it away. The residents of the WTF take over hosting duties, including Pencil after she gets eliminated at the Cake at Stake ceremony. Overwhelmed by the pressure of her split allegiance, Needle joins Fries instead. The challenge is for the contestants be their "truest selves" (return to their typical appearance). Book embarks on a wild goose chase of errands to restore her original cover, while Tennis Ball and Nickel are sent forward in time after a mishap involving Yoylite. W.O.A.H. Bunch wins the challenge and immunity as well as Fries whose prize was immunity into the final 6. Note: Several guest stars have voice roles in this episode, including Rosie O'Donnell and her child Clay O'Donnell.
18	"Airplanes in the Night Sky"	Joseph Pak	Joseph Pak	March 5, 2025
Nickel is eliminated, and Tennis Ball wins a "Disbandment Token", which he uses to dissolve W.O.A.H. Bunch. Needle and Fries also go solo, effectively beginning the merge of the game. The challenge is to turn on three beacons of a certain color. Pin betrays Coiny and wins immunity. Note: Rosie and Clay O'Donnell reprise their guest roles in the episode's cold open.
19	"🥚"	Joseph Pak	Joseph Pak	May 9, 2025
Tennis Ball wins the prize, and Fries is eliminated. Fries refuses to host with the WTF inhabitants, who all pursue him in an attempt to convince him. A fish monster from the sea becomes the new host of the competition, and players are tasked to fill their baskets with ten different items. The episode concludes in the midst of the challenge and prompts viewers to vote on the show's next host.
20	"Launch Party"	Joseph Pak	Joseph Pak	May 22, 2025
Directly continuing after the events of "🥚", Needle is guaranteed immunity due to winning the first part of the challenge, while the other contestants must give away their items for "immunity tickets". Coiny sacrifices his immunity to make Pin lose, leaving the two up for elimination.
21	"We're Not Friends"	Joseph Pak	Joseph Pak	July 17, 2025
Pin begrudgingly helps Leafy find a yellow tomato to turn her back to normal. Elsewhere, the Cake at Stake begins, and Leafy receives the most votes to host. Pin and Coiny reconcile; Leafy tries and fails to do the same with Firey, who insists he does not remember her.
22	"I'm the Main Character"	Joseph Pak	Cary Huang & Joseph Pak	August 8, 2025
Coiny wins the prize, and Pin is eliminated. The challenge is to travel with Leafy and win the most "Friendship Flags". The contestants find a Woody-shaped hole in the rebuilt Goiky Highway, so they recover Woody and force him in the hole. Tennis Ball and Book discover that Leafy designed the contest to go on forever, so they start destroying flags to speed the contest up. Enraged by her elimination, Pin erodes most of Dream Island Again, leaving only a small fragment remaining. The many flags being stabbed into the ground makes it unstable, eventually opening a hole to the Earth's core. Woody falls into the hole and Pin saves him by giving him her mech suit, dying in the process. Coiny and Needle travel to the core with Leafy to get the last Friendship Flag; Needle shoves Coiny into the molten lava where he encounters Pin's dead body. Tennis Ball drops Pin's old drill into the hole to kill Needle, accidentally killing Leafy instead. The contest ends, and Tennis Ball wins immunity.
23	"Shattered!"	Joseph Pak	Cary Huang & Joseph Pak	December 2, 2025 (Note: This episode premiered in theatres on December 1, 2025, before being released on YouTube the following day.)
Woody steals Dream Island Again and heats up sand with the mech suit to create a long glass bridge. A large crowd becomes the host; Book wins the prize while Coiny, still trapped with Pin's corpse below the Earth, is eliminated. The contest is to step on what is left of Dream Island Again. Along the glass bridge, there are optional mini-challenges corresponding with previous episodes, giving advantages to whoever completes them. Tennis Ball gets in a fight with Golf Ball, who is appalled by his cruel behavior. Pencil encourages Needle to rely more on her friends, while Pin encourages Book to be less of a pushover. One of Book's flags falls into the Earth, destroying Pin's corpse. The contest culminates in a standoff between the contestants and Woody at the end of the bridge, which quickly ends after Woody falls off from fear. Nickel accidentally uses a Swap Token with Coiny, and he shatters the bridge with Pin's drill while attempting to kill Book, sending the contestants and prize down to the ground. Book wins, leaving Tennis Ball and Needle up for elimination. Note: Clay O'Donnell, Rosie O'Donnell, and TomSka reprise their guest roles.
24	"Say Hijack"	Joseph Pak	Cary Huang & Joseph Pak	March 8, 2026
The remaining contestants are the only ones willing to host. Using the "Florilegium Annals: Recording The Strange" book as a guide, Book records the votes, Needle bakes a cake, and Tennis Ball builds a place for the ceremony. Needle brings the eliminated contestants to the FreeSmart Kitchen, causing conflict, while Book receives a vague call telling her to "follow the twin blue stars." A discarded ball of yeast from a failed baking attempt grows wildly and almost destroys the HPRC; Tennis Ball uses his Cake at Stake place to send the yeast ball into space, but accidentally brings Needle and himself along with it. After the yeast ball collides with Book, the three discover Evil Leafy trapped inside. Tennis Ball splits the ball in two, Needle cooks Evil Leafy into a cake, and Book follows the stars to the edge of the universe. Book meets Jack, a self-proclaimed "Strange", who helps her log the votes. The contestants return to Earth and begin the Cake at Stake: Needle wins the prize, and Tennis Ball is eliminated. Tennis Ball gives a heartfelt speech, reconciling his relationship with Golf Ball. Later, Golf Ball begins thinking up a solution to bring Pin's limbs back.
25	"She Deserves This"	Joseph Pak	Cary Huang & Joseph Pak	May 18, 2026 (Note: This episode premiered in theatres on May 17, 2026, before being released on YouTube the following day.)
Golf Ball uses the red paint on Pin's body to create new limbs for her. Leafy is ridiculed after joining the final Cake at Stake, spawning Evil Leafy. Golf Ball deduces that Evil Leafy is tied to Leafy's emotions, and the others attempt to kill Leafy to stop the both of them. Firey steals the show's prize to distract everyone, mirroring Leafy's theft in the previous season, beginning a chase that ends with Needle cornering him. Book tries convincing Leafy to return Dream Island and reconcile with everyone, but Leafy remains stubborn. When the others attempt to kill Leafy permanently, Book takes charge and pretends to kill her, leaving her a note telling her to leave. Evil Leafy steals the prize, so Book and Needle use water fountains powered by their votes to chase her into space. Needle defeats Evil Leafy, while Book receives more votes, making Book the season's winner. After Book is congratulated, everyone moves back to Yoyle City; as punishment for stealing the prize, Firey is locked in a cage dangling from the Yoyle Needy, a skyscraper in Yoyle City.

== Season 3: dnalsI maerD rof elttaB (2016) ==
No. in season	Title	Directed and written by	Original release date
1	"Welcome Back"	Cary Huang & Michael Huang	September 1, 2016
Set sometime after the conclusion of BFDIA, the contestants have mostly settled into Yoyle City and have various misadventures, including one where Pencil falls off the top of the Yoyle Needy. Golf Ball and Tennis Ball visit the Science Museum of Yoyle City and find a "Wall Teleporter", which can create portals through walls. They decide to use the Wall Teleporter to free contestants that are still inside the Tiny Loser Chamber, though they can only do one at a time.

== Season 4: Battle for B.F.D.I./B.F.B. (2017–2021) ==
No. in season	Title	Directed by	Written by	Original release date
Battle for B.F.D.I.
1	"Getting Teardrop to Talk"	Cary Huang & Michael Huang	Satomi Hinatsu, Cary Huang & Michael Huang	November 3, 2017
Set sometime after the events of IDFB, the TLC inhabitants have been released, and everyone has settled into a grassland. After Flower calls Black Hole over to open a jar of cyanide dug up by Marker, Stapy and Dora, the recovery centers are destroyed once again. Two creatures known as "Algebraliens", Four and X, arrive on Earth to start a new competition, with the prize being a "BFDI", which gives its holder full ownership of the show's recordings. Four is able to recover contestants by rematerializing them with his hand, eliminating the need for recovery centers. The 60 contestants, joined by newcomers Foldy, Liy, Loser and Stapy to make 64, split into eight teams of equal size, being Death P.A.C.T., (Note: Short for "Death Prevention and Creating Trust", and consists of Black Hole, Bottle, Liy, Pen, Pie, Pillow, Remote and Tree.) Free Food, (Note: Consists of Bell, Eraser, Foldy, Fries, Marker, Puffball, Stapy and Yellow Face.) BEEP, (Note: Consists of Balloony, Cloudy, David, Leafy, Nickel, Roboty, Rocky and Woody.) iance, (Note: Consists of Bubble, Fanny, Flower, Lightning, Match, Pencil, Ruby and Snowball.) The Losers, (Note: Consists of Cake, Clock, Coiny, Eggy, Firey, Loser, Needle and Pin.) A Better Name Than That, (Note: Consists of 8-Ball, Basketball, Blocky, Golf Ball, Grassy, Robot Flower, Tennis Ball and TV.) Team Ice Cube (Note: Consists of Barf Bag, Bomby, Bracelety, Donut, Firey Jr., Gelatin, Naily and Spongy.) and [8 names at once] ("Bleh"). (Note: Consists of Book, Dora, Gaty, Ice Cube, Lollipop, Saw, Taco and Teardrop.) The first challenge is to retrieve X's lost baskets, which iance loses.
2	"Lick Your Way to Freedom"	Cary Huang & Michael Huang	Satomi Hinatsu & Michael Huang	November 17, 2017
Pencil is the first to be eliminated and is abruptly absorbed into Four. The contestants egg on Four to recover their dead teammates. After initially refusing, he recovers them all inside of large, hollow jawbreakers, and the second contest is to find one of the revived contestants inside of one. When BEEP is revealed to have lost, they give up on their jawbreaker, leaving the remaining contestant, Taco, trapped inside.
3	"Why Would You Do This on a Swingset"	Cary Huang & Michael Huang	Cary Huang & Michael Huang	December 8, 2017
Leafy is the next to be eliminated. The teams use varying strategies to spin their swing set around fifty times in order to win immunity, which Team Ice Cube loses. During the challenge, members of Bleh speculate on the whereabouts of Taco, despite the jawbreaker holding her sitting right next to them. When Taco manages to free herself from the jawbreaker after the challenge, Book accuses her of leaving them and she and her teammates shun Taco.
4	"Today's Very Special Episode"	Cary Huang & Michael Huang	Satomi Hinatsu, Cary Huang & Michael Huang	December 22, 2017
Bracelety is the next to be eliminated. Four challenges the teams to create him the best "makeover" (depiction) possible in honor of the fourth episode. Death P.A.C.T. is far too caught in a conundrum involving forks to commit time to the challenge, and Pen's depiction of Four leaves them up for elimination.
5	"Fortunate Ben"	Cary Huang & Michael Huang	Cary Huang & Michael Huang	January 12, 2018
The Cake at Stake is fortune cookies made by Bracelety, and Liy is eliminated. The challenge is for each team to keep their paper airplane in the sky, with the first to hit the ground being put up for elimination. Stapy staples the paper airplane together with Free Food stuck inside. Free Food begins their descent along with team BEEP. BEEP barely loses the challenge after Stapy's staples crack open the ground and save Free Food from losing the challenge.
6	"Four Goes Too Far"	Cary Huang & Michael Huang	Cary Huang & Pokey	February 3, 2018
During Cake at Stake, A Better Name Than That decides that Four's abusive behavior has gone on long enough, and plots to get rid of him by "multiplying" him with zero, using X as a multiplication operator and Donut as the zero integer. The plan is successful, and Four is absorbed into Donut, who becomes the new host of the show. Roboty is the next to be eliminated, and he escapes to his personal realm. The challenge is to avoid contracting the "Twinkle of Contagion," a glowing effect that envelops whoever looks at it. A Better Name Than That uses a rocket ship to head to the moon, followed by Bleh, but they catch the Twinkle when they look down on Earth. Taco leaves them and tricks Bell into looking at the moon and catching the Twinkle. The rocket ship gets damaged, leaving both teams stranded. The Losers hide in a large basket to avoid contracting the Twinkle. However, Bell manages to smash through the basket and pass the Twinkle to The Losers just before time runs out, putting them up for elimination.
7	"The Liar Ball You Don't Want"	Cary Huang & Michael Huang	Michael Huang	February 16, 2018
Loser, an extremely popular contestant, is scrutinized after lying about having played with eye popper toys in the past, as said eye poppers had just been created. He is then eliminated during the Cake at Stake ceremony, and is sealed inside one of the leftover jawbreakers. For the challenge, teams must prevent the jawbreaker from entering their hole to avoid being put up for elimination, which A Better Name Than That loses.
8	"Questions Answered"	Cary Huang & Michael Huang	Cary Huang	March 10, 2018
Donut, communicating through TV, uses his new camera, which transmits matter, to conjoin the Earth and the Moon, allowing A Better Name Than That and Bleh to return to Earth. In a trivia contest, teams must press their buzzers and answer Donut's questions. 8-Ball is eliminated and crushed by the moon after Donut turns the gravity back on, and Saw inhales the fumes created by his death, causing her to only respond with "eight" whenever answering a question, as well as causing her to shout "eight" whenever using words that rhyme with it. Stapy creates a fake buzzer to steal the final answer from Bubble, but he is caught by Match, placing his team up for elimination.
9	"This Episode Is About Basketball"	Satomi Hinatsu, Cary Huang, Michael Huang & Pokey	Satomi Hinatsu & Pokey	April 6, 2018
It is revealed that X had narrowly escaped being "multiplied" and went into hiding, and a tired Donut decides to make him the host. Stapy is eliminated as X reads the Cake at Stake votes backwards. The challenge is to throw balls into a basket and weigh it down onto the buzzers from the previous challenge, lost by BEEP.
10	"Enter the Exit"	Satomi Hinatsu, Cary Huang, Michael Huang & Pokey	Satomi Hinatsu, Cary Huang & Pokey	April 28, 2018
Once the contestants realize that Four was the only available source of contestant recovery (as X does not know how to do that yet and Donut's own attempts failed) and still had the "BFDI" on him when he was absorbed into Donut, they decide that the next challenge is to bring him back. Firey and Pin successfully do so, extracting his essence from Donut, and once Four is recovered, he recovers the dead contestants and sends the remaining eliminated contestants to "Eternal Algebra Class Withfour" [sic] (abbreviated as EXIT, and part of the Fourest, a pocket dimension inside of Four), where the other eliminated contestants are. Instead of an elimination, one player in the EXIT gets the chance to rejoin BFB. That night, Taco and Bell fall out over the former's trick in "Four Goes Too Far", which Lollipop witnesses from the sidelines.
11	"Get to the Top in 500 Steps"	Satomi Hinatsu, Cary Huang, Michael Huang & Pokey	Satomi Hinatsu & Pokey	May 27, 2018
Leafy rejoins the game and is placed on The Losers due to them winning last episode's challenge. The challenge is to climb a pillar of stairs the fastest. Flower begins to panic due to the contestants in front of her not letting her cross, risking iance being put up for elimination. Flower finally breaks and pushes off the contestants on the stairs, with some regaining their position. Foldy sabotages Flower and the rest of iance in an attempt to avenge Stapy. Her plan is successful as iance ends up losing.
12	"What Do You Think of Roleplay?"	Satomi Hinatsu, Cary Huang, Michael Huang & Pokey	Satomi Hinatsu & Cary Huang	July 10, 2018
Match is the next to be eliminated. Each team is put in a room and has to guess which of their teammates has had their mind swapped with someone from a different team, while the "impostor" has to avoid being caught. Team Ice Cube loses.
13	"Return of the Rocket Ship"	Satomi Hinatsu, Cary Huang, Michael Huang & Pokey	Satomi Hinatsu, Cary Huang & Pokey	July 11, 2019
When Saw is also accused by Book for abandoning them after Saw had left in an attempt to cleanse herself of 8-Ball's fumes, with the pressure resulting in Ice Cube distancing herself from Book and attempting to switch teams, Gaty confronts Book about her abandonment obsession with Taco, who is currently having difficulties trying to socialize with the other contestants, as the other teammates have already realized that it was a misunderstanding. Ice Cube attempts to join Team Ice Cube at Cake at Stake, where Firey Jr. is the next to be eliminated, and Four uses her to cool down the soup handed out, which she barely survives, then attempts to join iance. The challenge is to find X's treasures, which Golf Ball and Tennis Ball find are various emeralds buried underground. Death P.A.C.T. attempts to retrieve Pillow from inside of Four after he swallowed her. A Better Name Than That digs with the satellite dish with their broken rocket. Team Ice Cube and Beep jump into iance's hole, and they try saving Bubble from getting crushed, but Flower accidentally falls on Bubble. Team Ice Cube digs into a mysterious area.
14	"Don't Dig Straight Down"	Satomi Hinatsu, Cary Huang, Michael Huang & Pokey	Satomi Hinatsu, Cary Huang & Pokey	August 24, 2019
During the challenge, Team Ice Cube discovers a hot spring inside the Earth's crust. Spongy takes multiple dives into the lake and accidentally cracks open an underground volcano, which forces the team to evacuate. A Better Name Than That finds an emerald, but Death P.A.C.T, Team Ice Cube and The Losers use it to present it as their own, while Free Food presents fake emeralds from Yellow Face to Four. The lava starts to spread around the crust and later flood the surface, killing a majority of the contestants. iance barely escapes with an emerald due to Golf Ball's presence, Beep breaches Golf Ball's underground factory, with Woody hiding in a garbage chute that takes him to Four's eye, and Book jumps into the path of the lava to save Taco and Ice Cube from getting killed by the lava. Bleh loses, becoming the final team to suffer a loss.
15	"The Four Is Lava"	Satomi Hinatsu, Cary Huang, Michael Huang & Pokey	Satomi Hinatsu & Pokey	December 14, 2019
Dora is the next to be eliminated, and the remaining contestants on Bleh apologize to Taco for falsely accusing her. As the lava flood persists, the remaining living contestants are scattered and stranded across different areas in the grasslands, and the challenge is to find a way back to Four without dying. Flower discovers a button that drains the lava down a garbage chute, allowing Woody to escape, and sending the remaining teams in an all-out scramble toward Four. Team Ice Cube loses. The Losers then ask Four to recover their dead teammates, and he recovers them including Clock, who is disappointed to find no one had tried to recover him while he was dead.
16	"The Escape from Four"	Satomi Hinatsu, Cary Huang, Michael Huang & Pokey	Satomi Hinatsu & Cary Huang	March 24, 2020
During the elimination, the "EXITors" attempt to escape from Four's body. Spongy is eliminated, but is too large for Four to absorb. The "EXITors" climb through him, but despite a tug-of-war between Four and the other contestants, most of the "EXITors" are sucked back in, and Firey Jr. sets Spongy on fire, burning Four as well, and Spongy ultimately escapes along with Loser. As Four tries to recapture them, another Algebralien, Two, appears and invites the contestants to battle for the next season's titular "Power of Two". Four changes Battle for B.F.D.I.'s prize from a "BFDI" to a "BFB" to incentivize them to stay, but the majority, including X, move to the new season, leaving BFB with only fourteen contestants. To make room for the new season, Two relocates Four and the remaining BFB contestants to a new location, the "Pillary Ruins". Four restarts their season from there, while also reinstating the original "BFDI" as the prize, coexisting alongside the "BFB". Viewers can vote in the comments for a new character to join TPOT. The characters eligible for entry are 9-Ball, Anchor, Avocado, Battery, Blender, Boom Mic, Camera, Clapboard, Conch Shell, Discy, Income Tax Return Document, Kitchen Sink, Leek, Nonexisty, Onigiri, PDA, Price Tag, Rubber Spatula, Salt Lamp, Scissors, Shampoo, Shopping Cart, Snare Drum, Tape, VHSy and Winner.
Battle for B.F.B.
17	"X Marks the Spot"	Cary Huang & Michael Huang	Cary Huang	April 17, 2020
The fourteen contestants are split into two teams: those closer to Four's hue, blue, (Note: Consists of Balloony, Bubble, Gelatin, Leafy, Lollipop, Ruby and Teardrop.) and those closer to X's color, yellow. (Note: Consists of Blocky, Firey, Flower, Loser, Spongy, Taco and Woody.) The challenge is to retrieve X from the set of TPOT. The Four-colored team lassoes X, but their rope snaps, sending X flying toward the X-colored team, who win the challenge. The Four-colored team is up for elimination. The voting system is reversed, meaning that the viewers now vote in the comments for a contestant to stay, and the contestant with the least votes is eliminated.
18	"Take the Tower"	Cary Huang & Michael Huang	Cary Huang, Michael Huang & Sam Thornbury	May 4, 2020
Balloony is eliminated at the Cake at Stake, and Four vaguely mentions that the eliminated contestants are now going to "BRB". The challenge is for teams to protect their towers from each other. The X-colored team's tower is destroyed and the teams are given new names; the Have Cots for the winning team and the Have Nots for the losing team.
19	"How Loe Can You Grow?"	Cary Huang & Michael Huang	Cary Huang & Michael Huang	May 22, 2020
Spongy is eliminated at Cake at Stake; the challenge is to help X's crops grow better. The Have Nots use Spongy's space ship, which burns up in space as X and their crops' conditions fluctuates. The Have Nots win and The Have Cots are up for elimination.
20	"A Taste of Space"	Cary Huang & Michael Huang	Cary Huang, Michael Huang & Sam Thornbury	June 10, 2020
Ruby is eliminated. The challenge is to cool down X. The two teams attempt to cool him down in various ways, such as making a sun angel and running across the Earth so it becomes nighttime, which earns or loses them points. After many failed attempts, Leafy realizes they could cool down X by simply pouring a bucket of water on him, resulting in the Have Cots' victory.
21	"Let's Raid The Warehouse"	Cary Huang & Michael Huang	Cary Huang	July 3, 2020
During Cake at Stake, Loser's popularity makes him confident that he is going to stay in the game, until Four reveals that he is eliminated. For the challenge, the two teams are tasked with picking gifts for two of their teammates from Yellow Face's warehouse, and the receivers rate their satisfaction. The Have Cots win.
22	"Who Stole Donut's Diary?"	Cary Huang & Michael Huang	Sam Thornbury	July 24, 2020
The "BRB" is revealed to be a tall, fast-spinning column called the Big Rotating Building. After a Cake at Stake ceremony where Taco is eliminated with just a single vote less than Flower, Four takes the teams to court to figure out who stole the original prize for the ceremony: a diary that belonged to Donut. While members of the Have Nots testify before the jury (the Have Cots), Leafy, after hearing Firey's false statement, realizes he took the diary, and she and Firey take things outside and eventually reconcile over the events of "Return of the Hang Glider", making amends. X catches Firey in the act of returning the diary and informs Four. The Have Nots win, while Firey is sentenced to clean up the railroad.
23	"Fashion For Your Face!"	Cary Huang & Michael Huang	Cary Huang	August 21, 2020
Bubble is eliminated at Cake at Stake. The challenge is to rescue Four from jail and complete a cliff-and-warehouse challenge, as their journey is complicated by a sabotaged train and a fashion subplot involving Flower's sweater line. In the process, they accidentally end up freeing Purple Face from the metal box. The Have Cots win.
24	"The Game Has Changed"	Cary Huang & Michael Huang	Sam Thornbury	September 18, 2020
Purple Face obscures himself and furtively begins Cake at Stake, and Blocky is eliminated. Four announces a new change in the competition; the contestants face a merge and have to compete individually instead of on teams. The challenge is preparing a party for Four; several of the contestants do not set up a party for Four, rather producing ones for other contestants, hosts, and other occasion. Lollipop and Flower win immunity and Lollipop grants Gelatin immunity.
25	"The Tweested Temple"	Cary Huang & Michael Huang	Cary Huang	October 13, 2020
Firey is eliminated at Cake at Stake. The challenge is for contestants to enter a mysterious temple to retrieve "blessed totems", with only those who choose correctly gaining immunity. Teardrop finds the totem, while Flower, who is too busy dancing around the temple, finds a rock, and she and Teardrop win.
26	"The Hidden Contestant"	Cary Huang & Michael Huang	Sam Thornbury	November 6, 2020
Woody is eliminated at Cake at Stake. Four and the remaining contestants meet another participant, Profily, who claims to have been in the game since the beginning, albeit hidden from view. Four gets annoyed by their presence, and, frustrated by futile attempts at sending Profily away or getting them eliminated on purpose, declares that the challenge is to send the disqualified Profily to the BRB next to X's aloe vera garden. Leafy receives immunity.
27	"Uprooting Everything"	Cary Huang & Michael Huang	Sam Thornbury	December 11, 2020
To get away from interfering fans, Four leaves the ruins and goes on a five-week driving expedition carrying the contestants along with Purple Face and X, arriving in a desert. Lollipop is eliminated and has Gelatin inject a partial dose of her grape flavor into him. For the challenge, Four transports the contestants inside the "World's Largest Oven" and has them escape. Teardrop breaks free by utilizing a grappling hook and receives immunity.
28	"B.F.B. = Back From Beginning"	Cary Huang & Michael Huang	Sam Thornbury	January 15, 2021
While inside the bus, X learns how to recover people, while the contestants are given a note to come outside, where they reunite with the Announcer. Everyone favors the Announcer over Four, which angers them. Because of this, they merge with the desert, turning it blue. Leafy is eliminated. The challenge is to redo the previous challenges. In each challenge, contestants meet one or more eliminated contestants. Flower wins immunity after successfully completing the final challenge, leaving Gelatin and Teardrop up for elimination.
29	"SOS (Save Our Show)"	Cary Huang & Michael Huang	Sam Thornbury	February 12, 2021
Teardrop is eliminated. Announcer reveals that the show is facing cancellation due to a critically low budget (caused by his deliberate splurging and upgrading of their assets), prompting the contestants and Purple Face to scramble to raise enough funds to save the show in an abandoned TV studio; they also note Four never ran into budgetary problems unlike the Announcer. Taco becomes suspicious on why the Announcer suddenly returned after the events of "Return of the Hang Glider" and confronts him when he secretly takes the "BFB" and "BFDI" from Four; he reveals to her that after the first season ended, he wanted the show to continue, but struggled to maintain the show while avoiding being noticed by the contestants. After BFDIA ended, the Announcer returned home, until discovering Four and X with the "BFDI". Announcer waited for the cast to shrink before returning to take back the show. Suddenly, the show's budget begins to rapidly deteriorate, and at the last second, Flower donates $50,000, saving the show. The Announcer begrudgingly allows the show to continue and invites the viewers to vote who should win the two prizes.
30	"Chapter Complete"	Cary Huang & Michael Huang	Sam Thornbury	April 9, 2021
An episode of a season in an alternative reality dimension inside Four's mind is generated as a coping method, as Four believes that the contestants do not care for him because they favor the Announcer. When he realizes even the false contestants favor the Announcer, he snaps out the dimension. The Announcer holds the final Cake at Stake for Flower and Gelatin. Flower wins the season, but she awards the "BFB" to the runner-up Gelatin. Purple Face robs the "BFDI" for not getting respect. The contestants and X pursue Four to reconnect with him while the other contestants try to collect the "BFDI", but agree that the Announcer should hold it when he reveals it is the only remaining preservation of BFDI and BFDIA. The contestants follow Four to the Sun and, after Gelatin berates him for his behavior throughout the season, Four apologizes and they reconnect again. Afterwards, the contestants go their separate ways, with Firey and Leafy in particular going off to build a Dream Island of their own.

== Season 5: Battle for Dream Island: The Power of Two (2021–present) ==
No. in season	Title	Directed by	Written by	Original release date
1	"You Know Those Buttons Don't Do Anything, Right?"	Satomi Hinatsu & Pokey	Satomi Hinatsu & Pokey	January 10, 2021
The 40 contestants who transferred to the new season are debating whether they should consider returning to Four, though they eventually agree with Fanny's assertion that BFB is no longer worth competing in since Four changed the prize twice, proving himself untrustworthy. Two appears, beginning the Cake at Stake, eventually revealing Winner as the most-voted debuter to join the season. However, this makes the number of contestants 41, making equal teams impossible. Since the second most-voted is Nonexisty, who, in his nonexistence, would cause the total to remain at the incompatible 41, Two retrieves the third most-voted, Price Tag, to join the game instead to make the cast a divisible 42. Six teams are formed, being The Strongest Team on Earth, (Note: Consisting of Basketball, Bell, Eggy, Foldy, Grassy, Robot Flower and Snowball.) Death P.A.C.T. Again, (Note: Consisting of Black Hole, Fanny, Marker, Tree, Lightning, Pie and Remote.) Are You Okay, (Note: Consisting of Eraser, Fries, Golf Ball, Pen, Puffball, Tennis Ball and TV.) Team8s, (Note: Consisting of Barf Bag, Coiny, Donut, Gaty, Needle, Pin and Saw.) The S (Note: Consisting of Bottle, Clock, Cloudy, Ice Cube, Rocky, Winner and Yellow Face.) and Just Not. (Note: Consisting of Bomby, Book, Cake, Naily, Nickel, Pillow and Price Tag.) The challenge is to get to the top of the roof of Two's hotel. Death P.A.C.T. Again ultimately loses. Note: This episode takes place in between the events of "Uprooting Everything" and "B.F.B. = Back From Beginning".
2	"The Worst Day of Black Hole's Life"	Satomi Hinatsu & Pokey	Satomi Hinatsu & Pokey	June 18, 2022
Profily helps Teardrop attempt to join the show after BFB ended. Teardrop is allowed by Two to join, and is placed on a solo team (aptly named "Tear Drop") due to her late debut. Cake at Stake utilizes the voting format seen in Battle for B.F.B., and Pie is the first to be eliminated, and is sent by Two to an upside-down city realm. Since Two cannot recover contestants themselves, they order the Wireless Recovery Center (WRC), which looks and functions similarly to the HPRC. The challenge is to take blocks and stack them as high as possible, and the team with the lowest stack will lose, which ends up being The Strongest Team on Earth.
3	"Getting Puffball to Think About Rollercoasters"	Cary Huang, Michael Huang & Sam Thornbury	Sam Thornbury	January 28, 2023
Foldy is eliminated. Two reveals why two year-long hiatuses occurred, as they were busy making an "Atwosment Park". Realizing the park is empty, Two challenges the teams to make something for the park. Due to two teams (Team8s and The S) failing, and seeing how long it is taking to have another contest, Two decides to speed the game up by having two teams up for elimination at a time as opposed to one.
4	"Gardening Zero"	Cary Huang, Michael Huang & Sam Thornbury	Cary Huang	March 23, 2023
In the newly-built "Atwosment Park", Saw and Cloudy are the first to be eliminated under the new double-elimination format. In memory of Saw, her team gathers around a "funny plant" she liked, until it is suddenly destroyed. The "funny plant" is then revealed to be a critically endangered species on the verge of extinction, and the teams are tasked to protect the seven remaining specimens in different regions of the world. Just Not and Death P.A.C.T. Again lose. Despite their efforts, the "funny plant" goes extinct anyway due to a series of events that destroy the other teams' specimens.
5	"Fishes and Dishes"	Cary Huang, Michael Huang & Sam Thornbury	Sam Thornbury	May 4, 2023
Naily and Remote are eliminated. Two buys some new plates, but they are flung into the Goiky Canal. The teams are challenged to traverse the waters and each retrieve a plate to win immunity. The Strongest Team on Earth and Are You Okay fail to do so, and lose.
6	"The Great Goikian Bake-Off"	Cary Huang, Michael Huang & Sam Thornbury	Sam Thornbury	July 9, 2023
Eggy and Fries are eliminated. Four and X return as chefs in Two's hotel, but do not allow them to eat their food, so the teams are challenged to make dinner for Two. The S and Death P.A.C.T. Again lose the challenge. Note: First BFDI episode to be shown on a theatre.
7	"The Seven Wonders of Goiky"	Cary Huang, Michael Huang & Sam Thornbury	Sam Thornbury	September 10, 2023
Clock and Lightning are eliminated, and while Clock is allowed to remain a spectator due to an unresolved conflict with Winner, Lightning is so angered by his elimination that he unleashes a thunderstorm, destroying seven monuments across Goiky, including the moon. Two then decides that the challenge is to repair the monuments damaged by Lightning, with each team assigned to a different one. Conflict arises within Death P.A.C.T. Again as Fanny questions if their death-prevention goal is worthwhile. Robot Flower has Basketball overwrite her personality to that of Flower's, but her personality becomes that of Flower from the first season after Just Not's strategy inadvertently causes a blackout during the download, resulting in Robot Flower going on a violent rampage against all the failed debutants in the hotel. Just Not and The S lose the challenge.
8	"Balancing P.A.C.T."	Cary Huang, Michael Huang & Sam Thornbury	Sam Thornbury	October 25, 2023
Cake and Rocky are eliminated, with Rocky barfing into a volcano before Two sends him away. The teams are challenged to remain on a balance beam that was repaired in the last challenge, an homage to the first episode of BFDI. Teardrop falls ill from absorbing Barf Bag's vomit, so Snowball and Grassy volunteer to help her. Are You Okay and Team8s lose.
9	"Outbreak at Stake"	Cary Huang, Michael Huang & Sam Thornbury	Sam Thornbury	December 18, 2023
Barf Bag zombifies after being re-filled with vomit-infused lava. A zombie apocalypse spreads, infecting many of the contestants, Puffball and Coiny when they get eliminated, the failed debuters, and Two. The contestants are tasked to prevent their team from getting infected, and the two teams with the most members killed/infected are up for elimination. Due to poor wireless connection between Two and Just Not in Gelatin's Steakhouse, Pillow misinterprets the challenge as having to kill her teammates, not protect them, and causes her team to lose. Teardrop, who had sacrificed herself during the challenge to produce an antidote, is automatically eliminated due to her still being on a solo team. In the episode's stinger, the crack in the moon created by Lightning expands into a giant hole, and One, another Algebralien, emerges from the hole.
10	"Oneirophobe's Nightmare"	Cary Huang, Michael Huang & Sam Thornbury	Sam Thornbury	March 13, 2024
Nickel is eliminated. Everyone is irritable from the outbreak, which annoys Two, so they make the challenge to enter a teammate's nightmare and help them face their fears as a "bonding experience". Fanny and Black Hole discuss the motives of Death P.A.C.T.; Winner explains their past, revealing that they and Loser used to be a performing duo until they eventually drifted apart due to their differing opinions of handling their fame, and makes up with Clock; and Price Tag reaches out to a lonely Book and they become friends. Just Not and The Strongest Team on Earth lose.
11	"Out Of The Blue"	Cary Huang, Michael Huang & Sam Thornbury	Niall Burns, Michael Huang, Sutton Hull & Sam Thornbury	June 14, 2024
The EXIT's inhabitants try to devise a new plan to escape Four by getting resources they need from the Fourest and splitting up to make the plan easier. They spend years getting said resources as an attempt to escape Four. They eventually escape Four, but then Two makes them work in the hotel's kitchens in an attempt to compromise with Four's insistence of putting them back in the EXIT. The "EXITors", angered by this, try to escape. Later, Purple Face gets trapped inside Four trying to "save" the "EXITors" after learning of their entrapment, not realizing they already left.
12	"What's Up Bell's String?"	Cary Huang, Michael Huang & Sam Thornbury	Written by : Sam Thornbury; Story by : Niall Burns & Sutton Hull	July 15, 2024
Book and Price Tag climb Bell's string and discover that it passes through an area in the sky called Band Land. One kidnaps Bomby and Bell after their eliminations and shuffles the remaining contestants into four new teams: Death P.A.C.T. Yet Again, (Note: Consists of Black Hole, Fanny, Gaty, Marker, Pin, and Tree.) Team 2, (Note: Consists of Book, Eraser, Grassy, Ice Cube, Price Tag and Snowball.) "BAGGED" (Note: The team's name is a brief melody consisting of six notes; BAGGED is the melody in letter notation. The team itself consists of Basketball, Bottle, Needle, Pen, Tennis Ball and TV.) and CloudYAY. (Note: Consists of Barf Bag, Donut, Golf Ball, Pillow, Winner and Yellow Face.) The new teams are tasked to fill their respective pits with whatever they can find, and CloudYAY and "BAGGED" lose. Robot Flower, initially not placed on a team, is taken in by Death P.A.C.T. Yet Again as a reward for winning the contest. One starts to write deals with contestants, and Basketball begins to follow her as she grows suspicious. The "EXITors" manage to escape the kitchen, and Two allows one of them to join TPOT. In a post-credits scene, Basketball is noticed and One kidnaps her.
13	"Category One"	Cary Huang, Michael Huang & Sam Thornbury	Niall Burns & Sam Thornbury	September 14, 2024
One continues to meddle in the game, creating a massive hurricane that rages through Goiky (forcing everyone into the hotel in the process), and altering the whiteboard so that two "EXITors" can join instead of one, those being Pencil and Liy, the latter of whom would have joined by default. The two join CloudYAY and "BAGGED", respectively, while the remaining "EXITors" are thrown into the storm and swept away to various parts of the world, with Roboty crashing back into the hotel. With Barf Bag and Needle eliminated (and kidnapped by One as well), the challenge is for each team to stop a specific part of the chaos from reaching Two and disturbing their sleep. Robot Flower's rage reaches a climax, and Fanny and Tennis Ball work together to reset her, though they only manage to shut her down; Basketball is ultimately coerced into signing a contract to bring Robot Flower's original personality back. The four have Black Hole suck up the storm to end the hurricane, and Team 2 and Death P.A.C.T. Yet Again lose. Meanwhile, Firey, living on an island with Leafy, discovers the latter has gone missing during the hurricane.
14	"I SAID CAREFUL!!!"	Cary Huang, Michael Huang & Sam Thornbury	Niall Burns, Sutton Hull & Sam Thornbury	November 9, 2024
The contestants begin repairing the damage caused by the hurricane. TPOT's failed debuters host Cake at Stake while Two is busy cleaning up the hotel. After Eraser and Gaty's eliminations, Two is distraught by the latter's elimination, and instead allows Gaty to work in Four and X's kitchen. The challenge is to capture one of two flags; either from atop a snowy mountain, or atop a volcano. Three of four teams go for the former. Firey Jr. decides to takes shelter from the cold in a cabin, but he falls victim to fighting between Team 2 and "BAGGED", and is killed when the cabin collapses. Once Grassy captures the snowy flag for Team 2, all teams attempt to collaborate to stop CloudYAY from capturing the volcano flag. Death P.A.C.T. Yet Again and "BAGGED" lose, with everyone dead except for Black Hole and Winner. Meanwhile, the storm carries Match to the former Battle for B.F.B. contest grounds, where she reunites with Bubble and Ruby.
15	"Seasonal Shift"	Sam Thornbury	Niall Burns, Sutton Hull & Sam Thornbury	January 1, 2025
The failed debuters discover the Yoylite from "Start the Shift" and learn of its time-traveling capabilities. They are transported to different periods in the past, which results in alterations to the series' timeline, and a large crack in the sky, known as the "Rift", is formed as a result. With Basketball and Robot Flower eliminated, Black Hole tasks the contestants to time-travel to past episodes to fix differences and catch the debuters. Death P.A.C.T. Yet Again and Team 2 lose. The timeline is further damaged along the way, causing the Rift to grow larger, culminating in Pencil's attempt to change her past accidentally resulting in Leafy being allowed onto Dream Island in "Return of the Hang Glider", causing the timeline to collapse entirely. Gaty signs One's deal to stop the collapse, thus most of the timeline changes are reversed, but the Rift still remains. Upon hearing that the timeline is still imperfect, Two is horrified to notice that Gaty is missing. Meanwhile, Firey finds 8-Ball and sets out with him to search for Leafy, while Bell, Bomby, Needle and Barf Bag, trapped in One's realm, find a door which leads to the "Equation Playground". Note: Kevin MacLeod, TomSka, Jacksfilms, Gooseworx, and Michael Gregory of Schmoyoho were also featured in this episode as voice actors.
16	"The Power of Four"	Cary Huang, Michael Huang & Sam Thornbury	Niall Burns & Sam Thornbury	February 24, 2025
With Two out of commission to host, deeply depressed upon Gaty's disappearance, Four and X take over as hosts while Fanny and Ice Cube begin investigating One's plans. After Pin and Ice Cube are eliminated, the challenge is a game of hide-and-seek, with both Four and X as separate seekers—the team with the most contestants found by Four and the team with the most contestants found by X respectively are up for elimination. CloudYAY loses the most to both, leaving them up for a double elimination.
17	"Bottle for Dream Island"	Sam Thornbury	Written by : Niall Burns & Sam Thornbury; Story by : Sutton Hull	April 15, 2025
Some of the contestants have been doing research about One. Bottle assumes hosting duties while Four and X are busy cleaning up their kitchen. After Yellow Face and Pillow are eliminated, she sends the contestants to the revamped Atwosment Park containing four separate challenges, each with one member from each team participating. During the contest, Donut is kidnapped by One, who offers him a deal in exchange for his arms back (which were previously stolen by Yellow Face in "Balancing P.A.C.T."). After Donut refuses, One removes his legs and kicks him out of her dimension, where he later uses Yellow Face's limbs that he finds in a bush. During the contest, Price Tag discovers that the effects of Loser's lie had gone outside the competition and that he was canceled online, and "BAGGED" and Team 2 lose. While exploring the Equation Playground, Bell, Bomby, Barf Bag and Needle come across Six, who joins them and leads them to another door leading to the EXIT, which Purple Face opens for them on the other side.
18	"BFB 31"	Florence Chapell & Sam Thornbury	Florence Chapell & Sam Thornbury	June 21, 2025
Lollipop loses her "Yellow Face Silver Standard Gold Credit Card" and suspects that someone has stolen it. Four sets up an exhibition challenge, using a device in the TV studio to send some of the former Battle for B.F.B. contestants into each other's memories to figure out who stole the card. Blocky figures out that the card was hidden in some couch cushions, though it turns out to have been taken by Match after making up with Bubble. After the challenge, Loser is overcome with guilt after learning of Winner's presence in TPOT, and ventures out to find them. In the stinger, Balloony is revealed to have been absent for at least 4 years, having been taken away in a UFO by the Announcer to space.
19	"Last One Standing"	Sam Thornbury	Sutton Hull & Sam Thornbury	July 14, 2025
Four distributes Two's power to the remaining contestants. As the Earth goes dark, TV (eliminated alongside Snowball) hosts Cake at Stake and initiates a battle royale as the next challenge. Purple Face leads the deal-signers and Six to the locked door to the EXIT, and Six reveals Three is also in the Fourest. One kidnaps Donut again, revealing to him that she had removed Gaty from the timeline as part of the contract, and does the same to Barf Bag and Basketball until Donut reluctantly gives up his portion of Two's power. Eventually, nearly everyone in the hotel is killed, and Pencil acquires most of Two's power from the dead contestants and TV (with Death P.A.C.T. Yet Again and "BAGGED" losing the challenge), and takes Four's power as well. One tricks Pencil into giving up Two and Four's powers by offering a chance to redo the events of BFDI. Pencil obliges and is sent back in time. One flies into space, continuing to wreak havoc. Grassy, who Pencil spared, is the last contestant alive. Winner, after being recovered by Price Tag via the WRC's wireless controller, reunites with Loser.
20	"Alone"	Sam Thornbury	Sam Thornbury	October 17, 2025 (Note: This episode premiered in select theaters across the United States on October 16, 2025, before being released on YouTube the following day.)
Set before the series's events on the Algebraliens' planet, an isolated One discovers a Yoylite meteor that grants her powers. After showing the meteor to her friend Three, they agree to share its power and keep it a secret. The next day, One finds that Three shared the Yoylite with the other Algebraliens. Feeling betrayed, One kills Three in a blind rage. Terrified by her actions, One attempts to recover Three but brings her back in a disfigured, catatonic state. Not wanting One to cause more harm, the other Algebraliens seal her inside the moon and depart for other planets. One later plots to enact revenge following her escape. She finds Three in a fortress dungeon in the Fourest, and plans to indirectly use the contestants to her advantage, mostly via her contracts. One tries to interrogate a kidnapped Leafy, but Leafy manages to pressure One into sending her away. Back in the present, shortly after sending Pencil back in time, One pays Four back by sealing him in the moon, then abducts Nine from a planet populated by skateboards. Meanwhile, Winner and Loser make up with each other, joined by Firey Jr. Note: Nominated for the Webby Awards for Social, Social Features and Best Use of Video category in 2026.
21	"Insectophobe's Nightmare 6"	Sam Thornbury	Niall Burns, Sutton Hull & Sam Thornbury	January 30, 2026 (Note: This episode premiered early in select theaters across the United States on January 29, 2026 before being released on YouTube the following day.)
The black goop dripping from the sky causes several things to mutate. Although no Cake at Stake is held, Two writes down the votes cast on a whiteboard, revealing Bottle and Tree to be eliminated. After Liy is recovered, Two reassigns the remaining contestants into two teams, based on a contestant's present living status at any given time, and declares the challenge: to unlock the door to Two's room. During the challenge, Golf Ball, Tennis Ball, Book and Marker are recovered. Learning what had happened to Pencil, Match rushes off to find her, joined by Bubble, Ruby and later on, X. Liy discovers she holds the key to Two's room, but has it stolen by Golf Ball and Tennis Ball; Golf Ball, while attempting to unlock the door, is killed by a stray venomous bug tendril, but still succeeds in doing so, rendering the alive contestants (Note: Consisting at that point of Book, Grassy, Liy, Marker, Price Tag, Tennis Ball and Winner; excluding the absent Black Hole and Pencil of ambiguous living status.) up for elimination.
22	"Suite Escape"	Sam Thornbury	Niall Burns, Sutton Hull & Sam Thornbury	April 12, 2026
As the eliminated contestants get sent to the city realm and begin to make sense of their new surroundings, they begin plotting a way to escape. Fries and Puffball attempt to smash a barrier outside, while the others, joined by Stapy and the still-competing Fanny, concentrate their attack on an exit door. As Snowball still had a portion of Two's power when he was sent away, he attempts to assist them, only to accidentally remove the door, revealing it to be a fake exit in the process. Snowball instead reverses the contestants' gravity so that everything is upright again, revealing that the location they were sent to is in fact Yoyle City, now in an even greater state of disrepair and having been transported inside Yoyle Mountain, whose peak is now separated from the rest of the mountain. After Fries, Puffball and Snowball's combined efforts destroy the barrier, the contestants explore the surrounding area, encounter a hole made from the separated peak, and fall through it back outside into the sky. Puffball, whose gravity is still normal, rushes to the hotel for help.
Defeat One trilogy
23	"Homeward Bound!"	Sutton Hull & Sam Thornbury	Sam Thornbury	June 28, 2026
With everyone now aware of One's presence, Two declares that the challenge is to stop her once and for all. The contestants jump into action after Winner and Liy's eliminations, but are quickly separated. The ones inside the EXIT locate Three, who begins angrily pursuing them. As all of the Battle for B.F.D.I. contestants slowly begin to regroup and meet more Algebraliens, One—who is now after X—begins fighting the contestants directly. X, Two and some of the cast find Four trapped in the moon. Meanwhile, Black Hole, who is inside One's realm, searches for a way out. Balloony and the Announcer, who are carrying several Algebraliens in the latter's UFO, are soon pursued by One before flying into the Rift.
24	"That's What Foes Are For"	Sam Thornbury & Joseph Pak	Sam Thornbury & Florence Chapell	August 16, 2026 (Note: This episode premiered early at the BFDI & II 2026 Tour on July 10, 2026 to August 15, 2026, (Note: "Here's your first look at TPOT 24, one of the TPOT episodes being shown at the BFDI & Inanimate Insanity 2026 tour! 👀 Get tickets below! 🎟️". X.) before being released on YouTube the following day.)
Black Hole realizes One's true motive: to restore Three to her original self and force everyone else into isolation. In the EXIT, Purple Face manages to pacify and befriend Three, who explains that Four said he would restore her, but then seemingly forgot about her. Meanwhile, Pencil tries fruitlessly to fix her past, and is eventually met by the passengers of the Announcer's UFO. Pencil then realizes that she had been set up by One and is not actually in the past, finds a new UFO for the passengers to use, and they all fly through the Rift back to the present. Pencil apologizes to Match for her actions and personally forfeits the competition for her own health. Just as almost everyone reunites in the EXIT, One confronts them again.
25	"All for One"	Sam Thornbury	Sam Thornbury & Joseph Pak	August 31, 2026 (Note: This episode premiered early at the BFDI & II 2026 Tour on August 22-31, 2026, before being released on YouTube shortly after.)
As the group splits into their Battle for B.F.D.I. teams and engages battle with One (suffering multiple casualties in the process), Black Hole begins sucking up One's realm. Fanny and Ice Cube are seemingly erased by One, but are actually sent to an empty void, where the other "erased" contestants are. One finds Three posing as Gelatin and gives all of her power to Three, which backfires as Three kills One with Black Hole's assistance, completing the challenge. With One disposed of, everyone is recovered, the "erased" contestants are restored, Two's power is returned to them, and the Earth is revitalized, with the Rift being repaired. Pencil leaves the contest grounds and her friends, and Four is banned from reobtaining his power for now. Two allows one individual not currently competing (out of all eliminated TPOT contestants, all BFB contestants, Profily, Announcer, Purple Face, and the Fourse) to join the game via vote; the least-voted character will join the next phase of the competition: the merge.

== Season 6: Battle for Dream Island Elsewhere (2026) ==
No. in season	Title	Directed by	Written by	Original release date
1	"Elsewhere on Earth"	Sam Thornbury	Florence Chapell & Sam Thornbury	January 1, 2026
While the first season is underway, the Announcer secretly starts a personal season in another area with David and eleven new contestants: Beach Ball, Fern, Hot Dog, Jammy, Money, Needy, Rose, Ruler, Sidewalky, Sticker and Toothpaste. The season's prize is Nightmare Island, a polar opposite version of Dream Island, and the winner gets to decide who will be trapped on the island. No teams are formed, meaning that contestants must compete individually. The first challenge is for each contestant to get to the top of their designated pole. The contestants use various techniques such as changing poles and using trampolines, and due to deciding to stick with his pole despite there being deadly spikes and saws on it, Hot Dog loses and is promptly eliminated. The viewers are then asked to vote for their favorite contestant in the game, which is said to be important later as the season continues. This request appears in subsequent episodes.
2	"The Bare Minimum"	Sam Thornbury	Florence Chapell & Sam Thornbury	January 8, 2026
The second challenge is to collect as many balls as possible within 10 minutes and put it in each contestant's assorted container. Sticker and Rose get away with cheating by painting the balls they collect gold (which are worth 98 points each as opposed to one), bringing both of their scores into the thousands. Money and Needy decide to only do the bare minimum to make sure they both stay in the game, which backfires when they have no balls left towards the end of the challenge. One last chance to earn a single ball is given when Jammy bursts after having Ruler stuff numerous balls inside of her. Just as the ball is guaranteed to land in Money's container, Needy decides to move her container over so the ball lands in it, eliminating Money.
3	"Everyone's Enemies"	Sam Thornbury	Florence Chapell & Sam Thornbury	January 15, 2026
The third challenge is divided into two parts; the first part is to jump off a cliff to retrieve a necklace. Nobody receives it; Needy finds another necklace and Sidewalky threatens the Announcer, giving the two immunity and temporary involvement in the second part. The next part is a tournament similar to that of "Reveal Novum", in which contestants randomly picked by the wheel must fight each other, with the winner receiving immunity. Needy and Sidewalky are allowed to help/hurt any of the contestants in the tournament, until Announcer changes the rules due to Jammy's criticism of Sidewalky's interference. Many rivalries are formed throughout the challenge, such as; Rose and Beach Ball, Toothpaste and Sticker, and Jammy and Ruler. Beach Ball is eliminated, losing to Sticker because of a broken Yellow Face product.
4	"Insectophobe's Nightmare 0"	Sam Thornbury	Florence Chapell	January 22, 2026
The fourth challenge is a snowball fight, with whoever getting hit first being eliminated. Rose is rejected from her alliance with Sticker, and opts to use a flamethrower to melt snowballs and defend herself. Jammy and Fern team up for the challenge to take her down. The two are chased into a cave, and encounter ice bugs that kill Fern. The bugs follow Rose and Jammy out of the cave, then turn into ice cubes upon touching frozen water. Afterward, Rose goes back to chasing Jammy. Just as she is about to eliminate Jammy, Sidewalky and Ruler stop her and use a newly thawed bug to freeze her solid. Fern, having just been recovered, finishes off Rose and eliminates her with a snowball.
5	"The Three Leg Three-Legged Race"	Sam Thornbury	Florence Chapell	January 29, 2026 (Note: This episode premiered early in select theaters across the United States on January 29, 2026 before being released on YouTube later that day.)
The fifth challenge is a "three-leg three-legged" race. The contestants are split into four pairs: Team Dandelion (Jammy and Sticker), Team Vermillion (Ruler and Toothpaste), Team Azure (David and Fern) and Team Death (Needy and Sidewalky). Each team has to have both of their members get to the finish while doing three challenges, all while being tied together. The first challenge is to climb 500 steps, the second is to collect a gem of a contestant's team's color in a cave, and the third is to cross lava on platforms. At the last moment, Sticker, who is with Jammy in last place, secretly switches with David, resulting in David and Jammy's eliminations.
6	"The Exploding Loser Chamber"	Sam Thornbury	Florence Chapell	February 5, 2026
The elimination area, the Tinier Loser Chamber, breaks apart after becoming too overloaded with the eliminated contestants. The Announcer sees this as an opportunity to do a rejoin challenge. All 12 contestants are split into six pairs, each with one eliminated contestant and one that is still in the running. The challenge is a game of hot potato with a chest, and whichever team has the chest after ten minutes will have its members switch their status in the competition. During the challenge, Needy has an outburst which makes her decide to stop being apathetic. Money rejoins and Ruler is eliminated. The Tinier Loser Chamber is then replaced with the much larger Titanic Loser Chamber.
7	"One Hundred Shells, No More, No Less"	Sam Thornbury	Sam Thornbury	February 12, 2026
The remaining contestants are awarded with a yacht trip for getting to the halfway point, but the yacht disappears due to "budget cuts". The Announcer promises to bring the yacht back once they do the next challenge, which is to retrieve a designated item from the lake and bring it to the Announcer. Toothpaste in particular is tasked with collecting exactly 100 shells, which automatically return to the lake should she have the wrong amount. When the last spot for immunity comes down between Fern and Toothpaste, the former secretly sabotages the latter (reducing the shell count to 99), resulting in Toothpaste's elimination. Contrary to his promise, the Announcer gets a hot air balloon, which disappears for the same reason as the yacht.
8	"Some Assembly Required"	Sam Thornbury	Sam Thornbury	February 19, 2026
The Announcer gives the remaining contestants their own speaker boxes, only to immediately destroy them, and declares that the challenge is for each contestant to repair their speaker box, with the last one to do so getting eliminated. Sticker disguises Fern's speaker box as their own and becomes safe, but upon seeing that Fern had seen through the deception and is awaiting his fate, a regretful Sticker makes it up to him by substituting Needy's speaker box for Fern's, rendering him safe as well. The other contestants fight over which speaker box should be fixed next, though ultimately, Needy loses and is eliminated. It is then revealed that the other eliminated contestants also have speaker boxes of their own.
9	"The Root of All Evil"	Sam Thornbury	Florence Chapell & Sam Thornbury	February 26, 2026
The challenge is a combination of all eight challenges prior. Contestants are given points based on their performance, with the lowest-scoring contestant getting eliminated. Fern calls out the Announcer for never taking action against Sticker's cheating, and the Announcer promises to keep an eye on Sticker, to the latter's chagrin. As the challenge progresses, Money's increasing hostility leads to the other contestants—including Sidewalky—to gang up on her. When the challenge ends in a tie between Sidewalky and Money in the bottom two, the former wins in a literal tiebreaker, and the latter is eliminated.
10	"Escape Nightmare Island!"	Florence Chapell & Sam Thornbury	Florence Chapell & Sam Thornbury	March 13, 2026
The final three contestants are forced onto Nightmare Island, where their final challenge is to navigate the island's hotel and then jump across a cliff. The eliminated contestants get to vote on who gets an advantage, with Fern receiving the majority. Fern's advantage is to skip the penultimate leg of the challenge. Sticker and Fern begin to argue when they reach the cliff, until Sidewalky pushes them off and takes the leap. Just as Sidewalky is about to make it to the other side of the cliff, a burst water pipe propels Fern ahead of him, making Fern the season's winner. Although he intended to not let anyone remain on the island, Toothpaste intervenes and shuts the gates on Money, trapping her. It is revealed that the votes determined the season's winner before the Announcer returns to the first season's contest grounds, with David in pursuit. Two alternate endings came out shortly after depicting what would happen if Sidewalky or Sticker had won instead of Fern.
