= Peoples Rocks =

Peoples Rocks (64°45′S 64°6′W) is a group of small islands off the coast of Anvers Island in Wylie Bay, located northeast of Norsel Point. Named for Ann Peoples, who served in a variety of positions from 1981–96; selected as the Berg Field Center Manager for McMurdo Station in 1986; first woman hired as a Station Manager; manager of Palmer Station 1991–96.
