= Betzel Cove =

Coordinates: 64°43′S 64°12′W

Betzel Cove is a cove in Wylie Bay, located east-northeast of Dream Island. It was named for Alfred P. (Buzz) Betzel, who was Ocean Projects Manager for the National Science Foundation's Office of Polar Programs 1974–86, and liaison in scheduling U.S. Coast Guard Icebreaker Antarctic deployment.
