= Dream Island =

Island in Antarctica

- Location within Antarctica

Geography
- Location: Antarctica
- Coordinates: 64°44′S 64°14′W
- Archipelago: Palmer Archipelago

Administration
- Administered under the Antarctic Treaty System

Demographics
- Population: Uninhabited

Additional information
- ASMA 7 Restricted Area

Dream Island is located south of the westernmost tip of Anvers Island.

Dream Island is an island lying 0.7 km (0.43 mi) south-east of Cape Monaco, off the south-west coast of Anvers Island in Wylie Bay, in the Palmer Archipelago of Antarctica. It was surveyed by the British Naval Hydrographic Survey Unit in 1956-1957 and named by the UK Antarctic Place-Names Committee for its natural features including a cave and, in summer, a small waterfall, with mossy patches and grass. It lies about 10 km north-west of the United States' Palmer Station.

== Fauna ==
The island has been identified as an Important Bird Area (IBA) by BirdLife International because it supports a breeding colony of about 11,000 pairs of Adélie penguins, as well as smaller numbers of chinstrap penguins. The site is protected as a Restricted Area under ASMA 7 - Southwest Anvers Island and Palmer Basin. Other birds located on the island include the southern giant petrel, brown skua, kelp gull, and imperial shag. The island also hosts a hangout spot for fur seals.

== See also ==
- Betzel Cove
- List of Antarctic islands south of 60° S
