= Kennedy Cove =

Cove in Wylie Bay, Antarctica

Kennedy Cove (64°45′S 64°5′W) is a cove in Wylie Bay, Antarctica, located north of Loudwater Cove. It was named for Henry Kennedy, who was Deputy Director of the Peninsula System for Antarctic Services, and also worked for Antarctic Support Associates. He managed the conversion of the MV Polar Duke from an oil industry supply vessel to a research vessel, and managed the construction of its replacement the RV Laurence M. Gould.
