= Island of Dreams =

Island of Dreams may refer to:

- "Island of Dreams" (song), a 1962 song by The Springfields
- The Island of Dreams, a 1925 German silent film
- "Island of Dreams" (Grimm), a season one episode of the television series Grimm
- Island of Dreams (amusement park), a Moscow amusement park

== See also ==
- Dream Island (disambiguation)
