= The Scale of the Universe =

Interactive online visualization tool

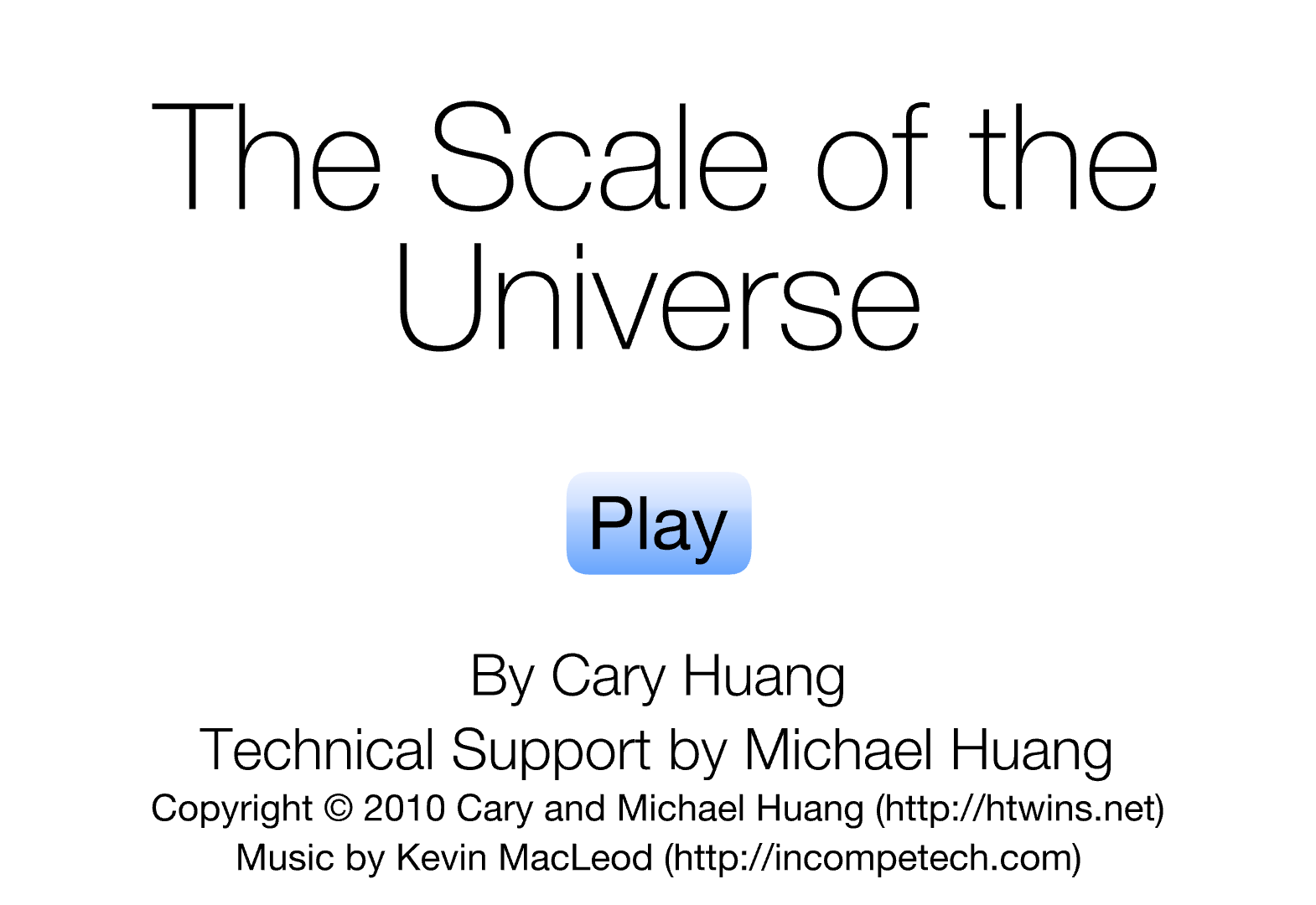
- Title screen of the first edition
- Developer: Cary and Michael Huang
- Composers: Kevin MacLeod; Cliff Martinez
- Engine: Adobe Flash
- Platform: Web-based
- Release: January 23, 2010
- Genre: Edutainment

The Scale of the Universe is an interactive online visualization tool and website created in January 2010 by twin brothers Cary and Michael Huang. It features a scrollbar that can be used to navigate through orders of magnitude and view various objects within such size ranges. Sliding the scrollbar to the left and right causes the screen to zoom in and out, respectively, using resolution independence in the process.

== Premise ==
The Scale of the Universe displays a title screen that redirects to a white background with various objects, including a human and a plant. It has a slider on the bottom that can zoom in and out to see the scale of different objects such as asteroids and plants. The further the user zooms in, the further down in scale it gets. The user can zoom in until the Planck length is reached and visible, or zoom out until the observable universe is in full view.

== History ==
=== Inspiration ===
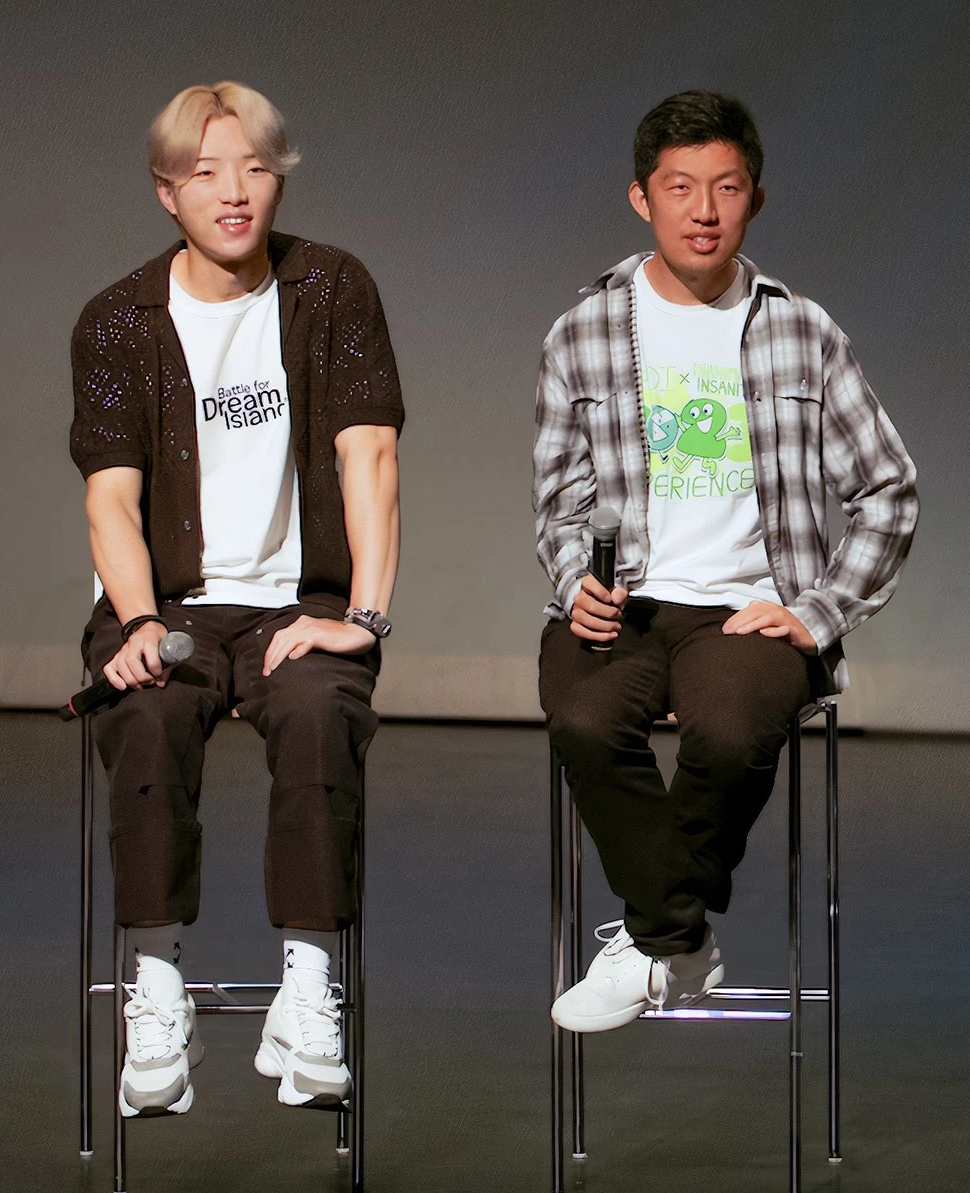
Creators Cary and Michael Huang in 2023.

Cary Huang first came up with the idea for The Scale of the Universe in 2010 when his seventh-grade science teacher put up a video that compared the sizes of different cells. Cary said that he felt it was mesmerizing seeing larger ranges of different sizes, which inspired him to make and code the page. Another inspiration was the online tool Cell Size and Scale, which was created in 2008.

=== Release ===
Cary, along with his twin brother Michael, began development of the tool and released it later in 2010. According to Cary, he used astronomy books and Wikipedia articles to help him scale the objects correctly. At some point they also released other versions such as "wrong", in which the objects are randomly rescaled.

In 2012, they released a new version called The Scale of the Universe 2, in which users can click on objects to see infoboxes with information about the object.

== Recognition and impact ==
The Scale of the Universe was featured on NASA's Astronomy Picture of the Day on October 7, 2018. In 2020, animation studio Kurzgesagt released the app Universe in a Nutshell, which took inspiration from The Scale of the Universe.

The main-belt asteroid 10003 Caryhuang was officially named by the International Astronomical Union on June 16, 2021, partly in recognition of Cary's involvement in The Scale of the Universe.

== See also ==
- Powers of Ten
- Cosmic Eye
- Cosmic Voyage
- Battle for Dream Island, an animated web series also made by the Huang brothers
