= Ann Peoples (Antarctic manager) =

US anthropologist and business manager

Ann Peoples, an American anthropologist and business manager, was the first American woman to serve in a significant leadership role in Antarctica when she was appointed manager of the Berg Field Center at the McMurdo Station in 1986. She went on to manage Palmer Station from 1991 to 1995.

Peoples studied anthropology at Wheaton College, Massachusetts, graduating in 1979. From 1981, she worked for the United States Antarctic Research Program (USARP) for 14 years, initially as a driver. In 1986, she was appointed manager of the Berg Field Center. It was seasonal work which combined well with her employment as an archaeologist with the Bureau of Land Management. She was the first women in the Antarctic to have a job title as manager when she became the Berg Field Center Manager from 1986 to 1989. The facility provided outdoor equipment and survival training at McMurdo Station. In 1991, she became the first woman to manage a USAP station when she was appointed manager of the Palmer Station on Anvers Island in 1991.

In 1998, Peoples Rocks off the coast of Anvers Island was named after Ann Peoples. After her work in Antarctica, Peoples worked as Deputy Program Director for chemical weapons demilitarization at Johnston Atoll, Hawaii where she became the first woman to receive the Commander's Award for Public Service. She then returned to California where she studied at the University of California, Irvine, where she earned an MBA in 2003. She then joined Thomson Advisors, Virginia, specializing in management consulting services.
