= Cary and Michael Huang =

American twin animators (born 1997)

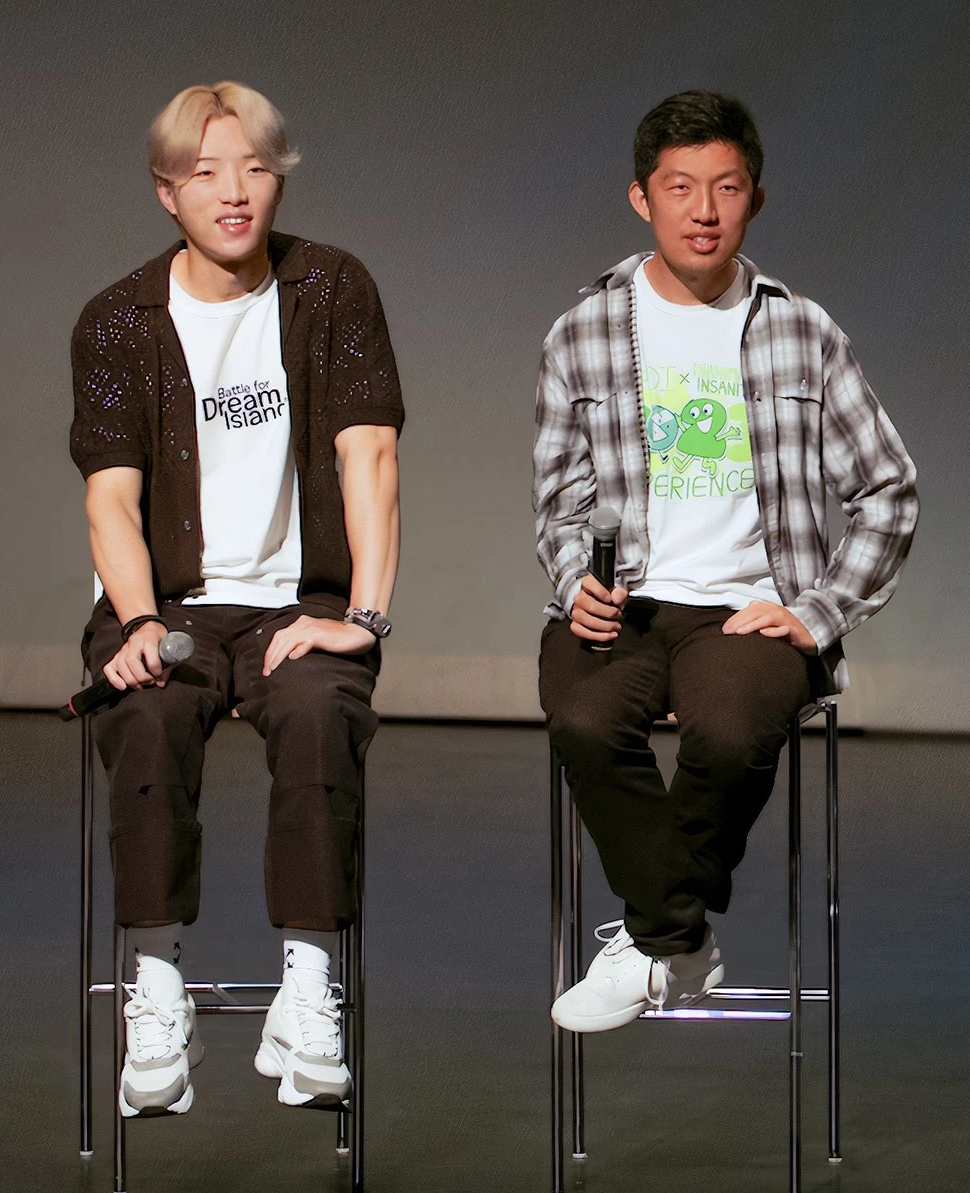
- Michael (left) and Cary Huang (right) in 2023
- Born: March 18, 1997 (age 29); Moraga, California, U.S
- Education: Campolindo High School
- Occupations: YouTubers; animators
- Years active: 2005–present
- Notable work: Battle for Dream Island (2010–present); The Scale of the Universe (2010; 2012)
- Website: htwins.net
- Cary Huang
- Education: Stanford University (BS)

YouTube information
- Channels: carykh; Humany
- Cary Huang's voice Recorded July 20, 2024

Signature
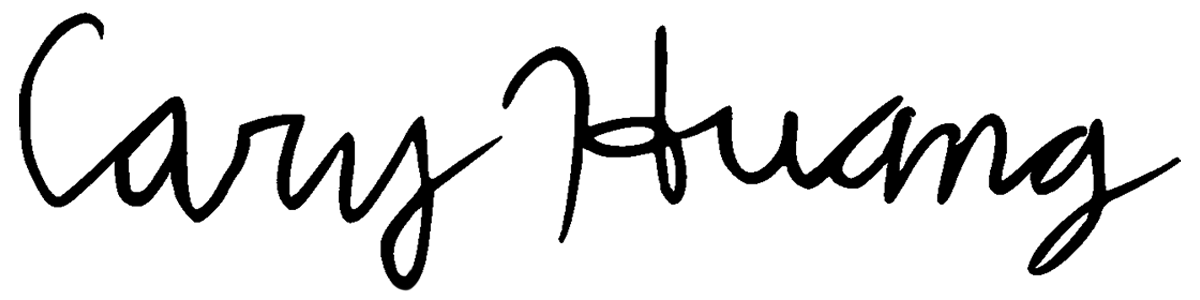
- Michael Huang
- Education: University of California Berkeley

YouTube information
- Channels: Michael H; Yoyle Cake
- Michael Huang's voice Recorded July 19, 2025

Signature
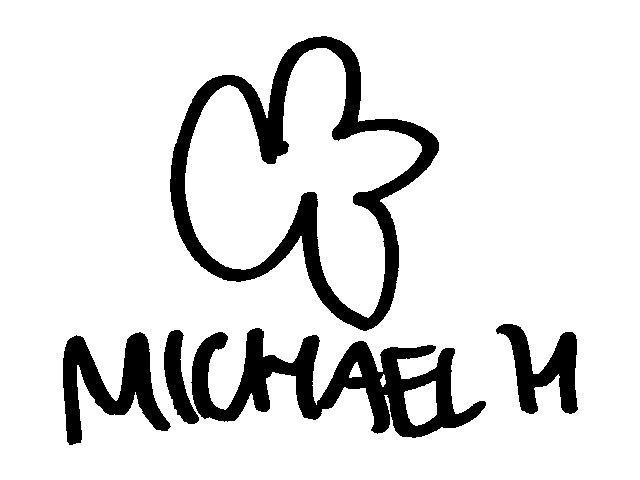

Cary and Michael Huang are an American twin brother duo of YouTubers and animators best known for creating the animated web series Battle for Dream Island and the interactive online visual tool The Scale of the Universe, both released in 2010.

== Early life and education ==
Cary and Michael Huang are twins, with Cary arriving two minutes before Michael, and were raised in Moraga, California. While attending elementary school, they began using the multimedia software program Adobe Flash. Cary "started using Flash when he was 10 years old", and Michael won an award for an animated video he made in 5th grade.

They graduated from Campolindo High School in June 2015. Cary later studied computer science at Stanford University where he obtained a Bachelor of Science degree in 2020. Michael studied film at the University of California, Berkeley.

== Projects ==
In 2005, the twins created the website htwins.net, where they released and hosted several Flash games, including the visualization tool The Scale of the Universe in 2010 and its sequel The Scale of the Universe 2 in 2012.

On January 1, 2010, the first episode of the animated web series Battle for Dream Island was posted to the YouTube channel, jacknjellify.

On June 21, 2014, Cary launched Abacaba, a YouTube channel where he uploaded data visualization videos, a few of which have received external coverage, including the ones about computer chess, internet memes, and the COVID-19 pandemic. Abacaba merged with carykh, another of Cary's YouTube channels, in 2022.

== Impact ==
The Scale of the Universe was featured on NASA's Astronomy Picture of the Day in 2018 and inspired the Kurzgesagt app The Universe in a Nutshell, which was released in 2020. On June 16, 2021, the International Astronomical Union gave the main-belt asteroid (10003) 1971 UD_{1} the name Caryhuang after Cary Huang, in part for his involvement in The Scale of the Universe.

The Huangs' web series Battle for Dream Island inspired a genre of similar animated web series called "object shows". As of 2026, jacknjellify has about 3.5 million subscribers.
