= Battle for Dream Island =

American animated web series

- Also known as: BFDI
- Genre: Object show; Parody; Slapstick
- Created by: Cary and Michael Huang
- Showrunners: Joseph Pak; Samuel Thornbury
- Country of origin: United States
- Original language: English
- No. of seasons: 6
- No. of episodes: 116 (121 parts) (list of episodes)

Production
- Running time: 5–60 minutes
- Production company: jacknjellify

Original release
- Network: YouTube
- Release: January 1, 2010 – present

Battle for Dream Island (BFDI) is an American animated web series created by twin brothers Cary and Michael Huang. A parody of the game show genre, it consists of competitions between anthropomorphic objects, with viewers voting for a character's elimination.

The show was first conceived in 2009, when Cary was assigned to create a fake catalogue for an algebra class, drawing a comic featuring an "improved" version of rock paper scissors. The twins shared the desire to adapt Cary's comics into cartoon form, which Michael attributed to his interest in digital animation. Production began shortly thereafter, and on January 1, 2010, the pilot episode was posted to their YouTube channel jacknjellify. (Note: Pronounced Jack 'n' Jellifee.) Other episodes and related media are also posted on jacknjellify. The twins have also cited Homestar Runner as influences.

Critical reception for BFDI has been positive. From around 2019 to 2026, jacknjellify's subscriber count grew from one million to nearly three and a half million. BFDI has also influenced a microgenre of similar independent web series known as "object shows". Starting in 2017, the crews of both BFDI and another object show from 2011 named Inanimate Insanity, would do fan meetups, and later start holding watch parties and screenings of the shows in theaters.

== Format ==
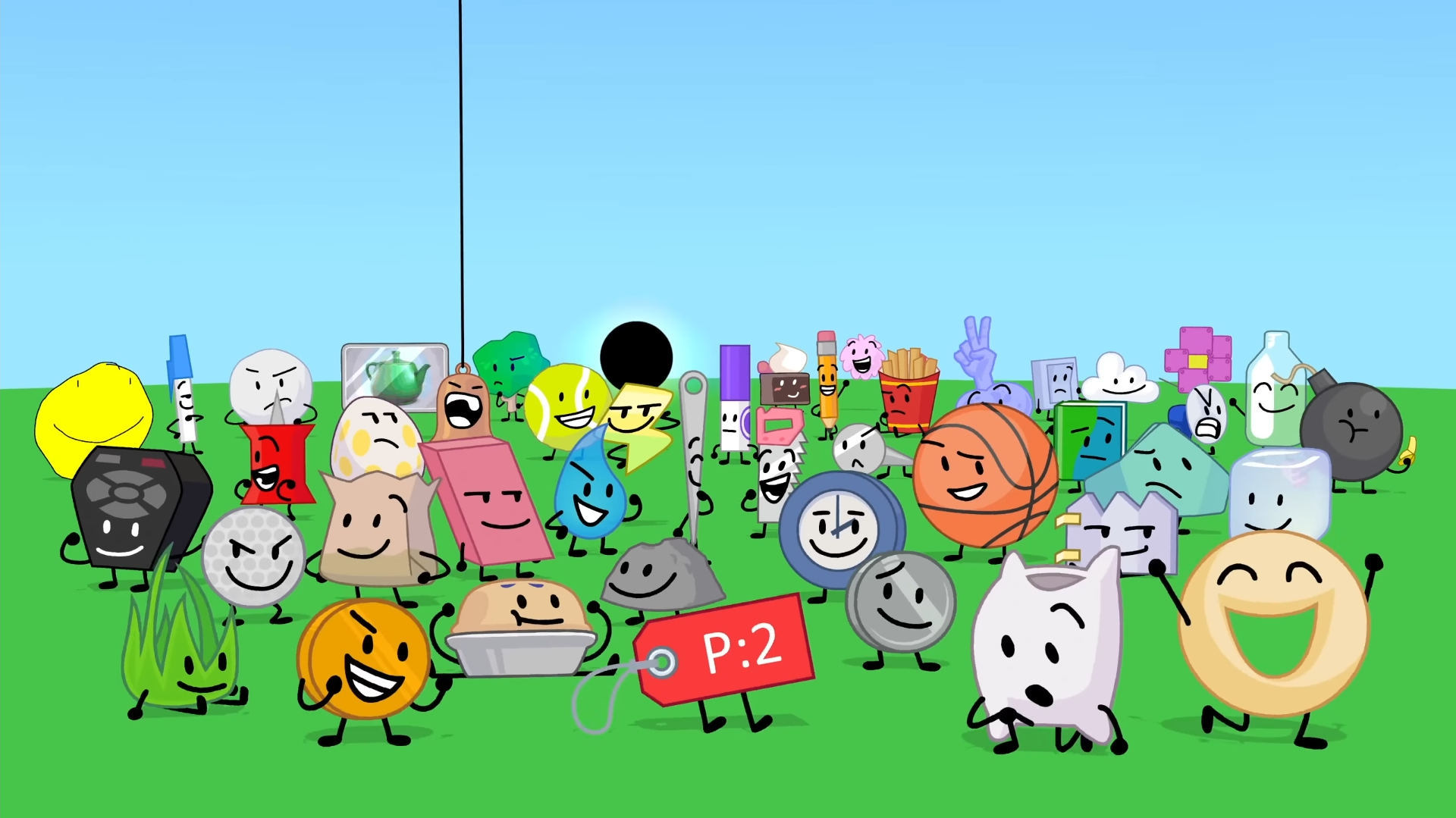
All contestants that competed in the fifth season of the series, from the season's introduction sequence.

Battle for Dream Island centers around contests between anthropomorphic objects as contestants. Each character is generally named after the type of object they are (e.g., Pencil, Leafy, Book, Bubble). The series is a parody of game shows, and was inspired by shows such as Survivor and Total Drama Island. The show's contestants compete in various contests, such as winning a race or scaling a wall, to win a prize and avoid elimination. Viewers can vote for a character to be saved or eliminated. (Note: The voting process varies per season;.) Characters display physical characteristics of their real-life counterparts and often die in ways similar to how these objects would be destroyed; they can be resurrected via a "recovery center". Whether a character is eliminated or saved affects the course of the series. In addition to voting, viewers could also create their own characters and send them to the Huang twins to be included in an episode as a cameo appearance, and also as a form of fan art.

== Series overview ==
Season	Title	Episodes		Originally released	
Season	Title	Episodes		First released	Last released
1	Battle for Dream Island	25		January 1, 2010	January 1, 2012
2	Battle for Dream Island Again	25 (Note: BFDIA 5a, 5b, 5c, 5d and 5e are altogether counted as one episode. 5b is a Flash game.)		June 29, 2012	May 18, 2026
3	dnalsI maerD roF elttaB	1 (Note: dnalsI maerD roF elttaB (IDFB) entered an ongoing hiatus after the release of its first episode. It has been confirmed that the season will resume at a later date.)		September 1, 2016	
4	Battle for B.F.D.I.	30	16	November 3, 2017	March 24, 2020
4	Battle for B.F.B.	30	14	April 17, 2020	April 9, 2021
5	Battle for Dream Island: The Power of Two	25		January 10, 2021	TBA
6	Battle for Dream Island Elsewhere	10		January 1, 2026	March 13, 2026

== History ==
=== Background ===
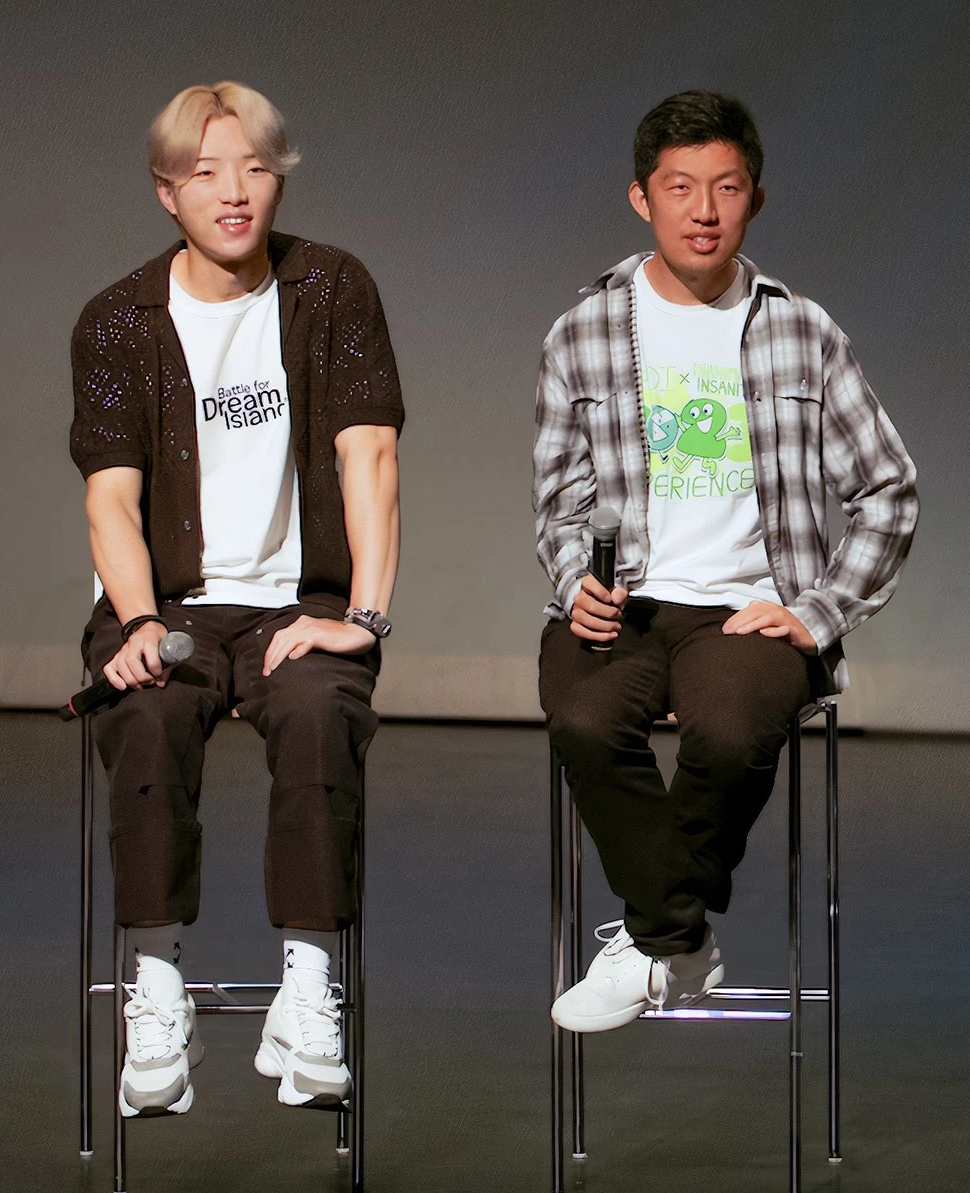
Battle for Dream Island creators Michael (left) and Cary Huang (right) in 2023

Twin brothers Cary and Michael Huang were born on March 18, 1997, and grew up in Moraga, California. While attending school, they began using the multimedia software program Adobe Flash. In 2005, the twins launched htwins.net, a website where they released several Flash games. In 2010, they created the interactive online visualization tool The Scale of the Universe, and its 2012 sequel The Scale of the Universe 2.

=== Conception and development ===
In 2009, Cary was assigned to create a fake catalogue for an algebra class, drawing a comic featuring an "improved" version of rock paper scissors called "water, sponge, and fire." While traveling together later on, the pair conceived BFDI out of a shared desire to adapt Cary's comics into cartoon form, which Michael attributed to his interest in digital animation at the time. Production began shortly thereafter, and on January 1, 2010, the pilot episode was posted to their YouTube channel jacknjellify. The twins cited Total Drama, Survivor, and Homestar Runner as influences for BFDI.

Like the previous projects by the Huang twins, the series was animated using Adobe Flash. While some episodes were written and directed by the pair, (Note: Writing and directing credits vary;) they eventually recruited additional writers and a full production team. During production, the twins graduated high school and attended separate universities; Michael studied film at University of California, Berkeley, and Cary graduated from Stanford University with a degree in computer science. In 2016, Michael stated that their Google AdSense account had been restored after being suspended for unknown reasons two years prior, which had prevented them from making more videos at the time. From around 2019 to 2026, jacknjellify's subscriber count grew from one million to nearly three and a half million.

== Reception ==
=== Critical response ===
Russ Burlingame, writing for The Beat, compared Battle for Dream Island's utilization of minimalist character designs to "how [the web comic] XKCD uses stick figures", citing the series's avoidance of "predictable traits" and "lazy jokes" referencing the character's physical appearances. Hein Kaiser of The Citizen called BFDI's animation style "almost old-school in its appeal", and described it as "simple, colorful, and deliberately rough around the edges." He also compared the web-series' humor to that of Charlie Chaplin. TV Guide journalist Tim Surette praised the series's high quality compared to other content found on the Internet, remarking that BFDI is "nearly indistinguishable from scripted animated series [aired] on Cartoon Network 10 years ago." /Film's Witney Seibold described BFDI as having a "sweet, direct, Kindergarten appeal", and commented that its characters and ideas "all feel like idle inventions conceived of by bored fourth graders."

=== Cultural impact ===
Battle for Dream Island has influenced a microgenre of similar independent web series known as "object shows". The term object show is used as an umbrella term for any animated series featuring a large cast of anthropomorphic inanimate objects—typically with simplistic, stick figure–esque designs—that compete in Survivor-style competitions. The fandom for BFDI is collectively referred to as the object show community, or the OSC. Surette describes the fandom as being "rabid", "accepting" and "positive".

One example of another object show is Inanimate Insanity, created by Adam Katz in 2011 for the YouTube channel AnimationEpic. The Beat described Inanimate Insanity as an "unofficial sister show" to BFDI. Two writers of the team behind Inanimate Insanity—Joseph Pak and Samuel Thornbury—worked on BFDI under "a showrunner-like role".

=== Awards ===
Year	Award	Category	Nominee(s)	Result	Ref.
2026	Webby Awards	Social – Family & Kids	Battle for Dream Island	Won (People's Voice Winner)	
2026	Webby Awards	Social – Weird	Battle for Dream Island	Won (People's Voice Winner)	
2026	Webby Awards	Social – Best Use of Video	"Alone"	Won (People's Voice Winner)	

== Other media ==
=== Merchandise ===
Battle for Dream Island has inspired a variety of merchandise. In 2013, BFDIA 5b, an episode of the second season Battle for Dream Island Again, was released as a browser game. A remastered version for personal computers was later announced by the Huang twins during their panel at San Diego Comic-Con 2026, with a possible Nintendo Switch port also being discussed. The Huang twins also began experimenting with producing physical merchandise in 2019, including "plush toys, silicon lamps, the works". Unaware that companies typically outsource merchandise production to external manufacturers, the twins produced the merchandise in-house. In November 2025, a comic book titled Seven's Secret Orb was published through the jacknjellify store following its announcement in a Black Friday email sent to customers. Written and illustrated by Florence Chapell, an animator for BFDI, it depicts a skirmish between the Battle for B.F.B. cast and a "mysterious number" over possession of an "elusive orb".

=== Live events ===
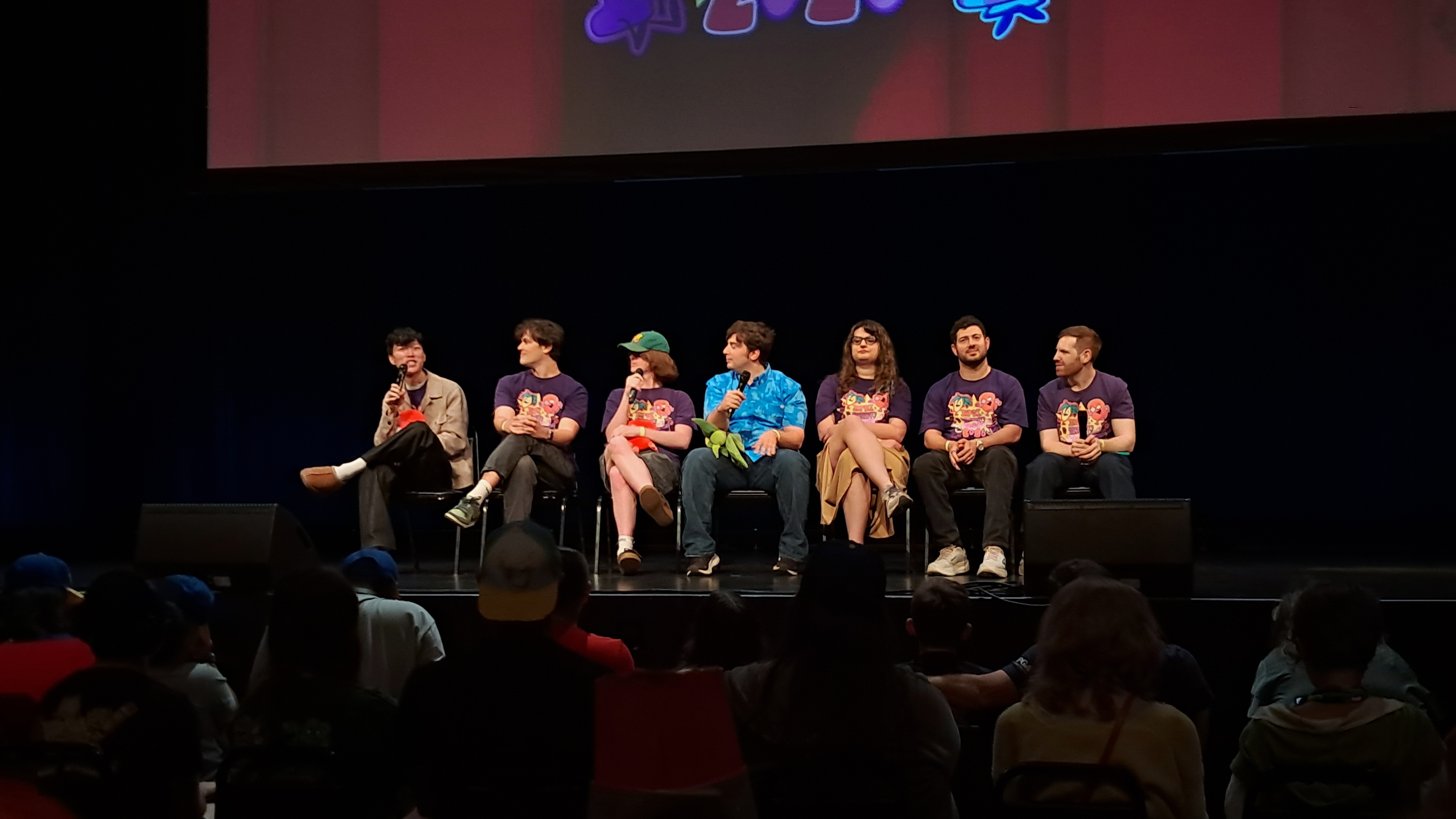
The crews of both BFDI and Inanimate Insanity during a 2026 tour

In 2017, a fan meetup occurred in a hotel lobby during that year's VidCon, a fan convention for content creators. Cary later recalled, "10 people came out, and it was such an exciting thing to see." Additionally, annual live tours in partnership with Inanimate Insanity began in 2024; activities included watch parties of upcoming episodes and Q&A sessions hosted by cast and crew members.

The twentieth episode of BFDI's fifth season, Battle for Dream Island: The Power of Two, was screened in AMC, Cinemark, and Marcus theaters across the United States on October 16, 2025, and uploaded to YouTube the next day. Several screenings were sold out, and the episode had one million views within nine hours of the upload. The twenty-third episode of BFDI's second season, Battle for Dream Island Again, was screened in Cinemark and Marcus theaters on December 1, 2025, before being uploaded to YouTube the next day.

== See also ==
- List of Internet phenomena
