= Wylie Bay =

Wylie Bay (64°44′S 64°10′W) is a bay 4 nautical miles (7 km) wide, lying between Cape Monaco and Norsel Point on the southwest coast of Anvers Island, in the Palmer Archipelago. First charted by the French Antarctic Expedition under Charcot, 1903–1905, it was named by the United Kingdom Antarctic Place-Names Committee (UK-APC) in 1959 for John P. Wylie, Falkland Islands Dependencies Survey (FIDS) surveyor at Arthur Harbor in 1956 and 1957.

== See also ==
- Betzel Cove
- Kennedy Cove
