= Eichorst Island =

Island in the Palmer Archipelago, Antarctica

- Location within Antarctica

Geography
- Location: Antarctica
- Coordinates: 64°47′S 64°04′W
- Archipelago: Palmer Archipelago

Administration
- Administered under the Antarctic Treaty System

Demographics
- Population: Uninhabited

Eichorst Island is a small island whose west end is deeply cleft into three parts, giving the appearance of three separate rocks at high tide, lying between Shortcut Island and Surge Rocks off the southwest coast of Anvers Island. Eichorst Island was named by the United States Advisory Committee on Antarctic Names (US-ACAN) for Marvin H. (Ike) Eichorst of Glenview, Illinois, licensed operator of amateur radio station W9RUK who handled radio traffic between points in the United States and Palmer Station during the period 1964–1972.

== See also ==
- Composite Antarctic Gazetteer
- List of Antarctic and sub-Antarctic islands
- List of Antarctic islands south of 60° S
- SCAR
- Territorial claims in Antarctica
