= RV Polar Duke =

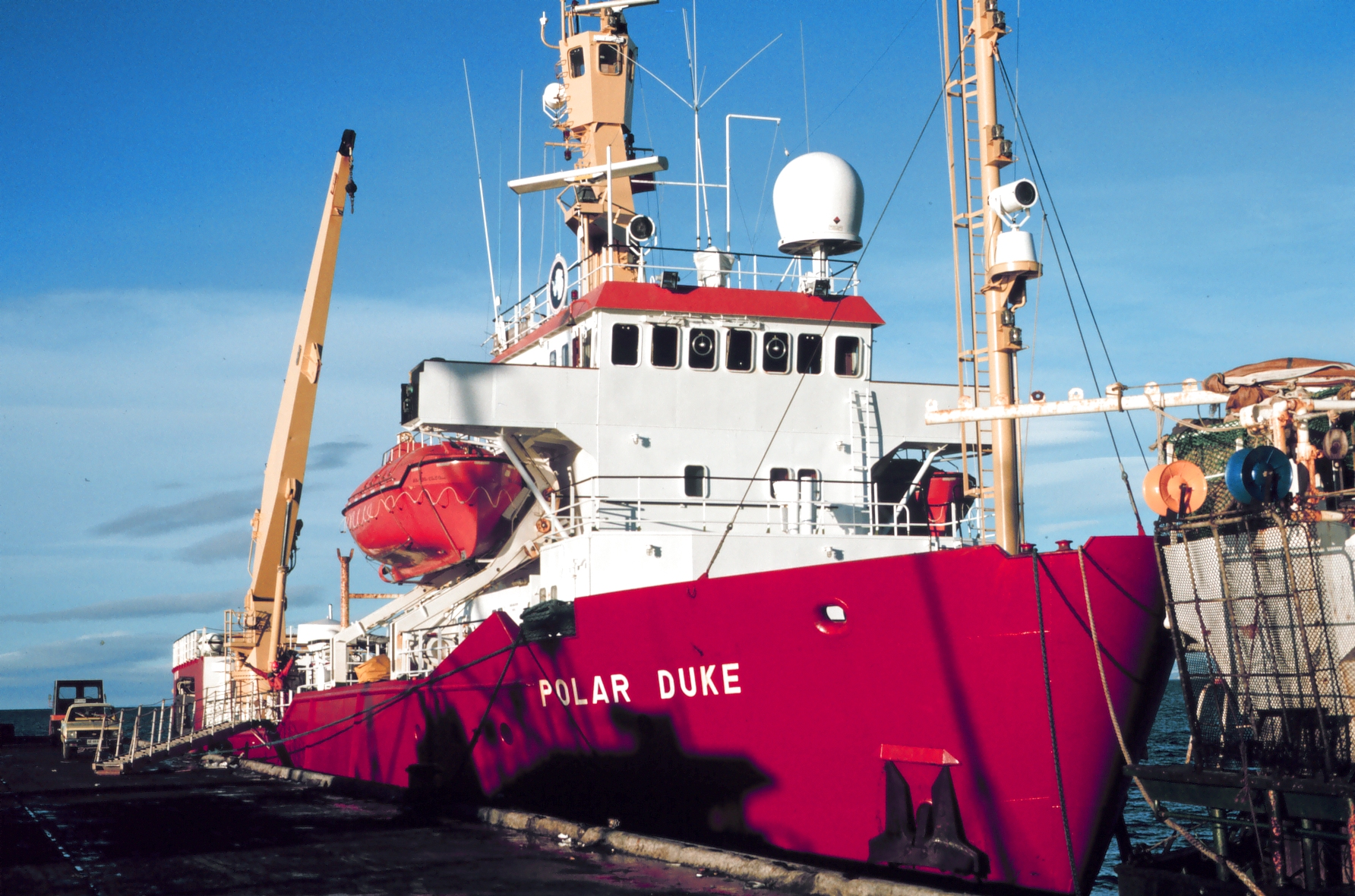
- RV Polar Duke in 1989

History
- Name: Polar Duke (1983-2006); CGG Duke (2006-2008); Duke (2008-present)
- Owner: GC Rieber Shipping (1983-2006); Exploration Vessel Resources/CGG/CGGVeritas (2006-2011); Gardline CGGV Pte. Ltd. (2011-present)
- Operator: GC Rieber Shipping (1983-2010); Gardline Marine Sciences (2010-present)
- Port of registry: Bergen, Norway (1983-2010); (The Bahamas) Nassau, Bahamas (2010-present)
- Builder: Vaagen Verft, Kyrksæterøra, Norway
- Yard number: 55
- Completed: 19 February 1983
- Refit: converted to seismic survey vessel May 1998
- Identification: IMO number: 8200838; MMSI number: 311044800; Call sign: LACS4 (1983-2010), C6YT7 (2010-present); DNV class no. 13520
- Status: in active service

General characteristics
- Type: research vessel
- Tonnage: Original: 1,594 GT; 1,119 t DWT; After refit: 2,031 GT; 537 NT; 1,400 t DWT
- Length: 66.65 m (218.7 ft)
- Beam: 13.00 m (42.65 ft)
- Draft: 5.80 m (19.0 ft)
- Installed power: 2 MAK 6M453AK main engines (2250 BHP / 1650 kW each); 2 Detroit Diesel 8V92T / Stamford MC534C auxiliary engines (305 kVA each); 1 Detroit Diesel 4-71T / Stamford MC334C auxiliary engine (112.5 kVA); 1,640 kVA Stamford MHC-734-H shaft generator
- Propulsion: Single controllable-pitch propeller in nozzle, Brunvoll SPX-VP 578 BHP bow and stern thrusters
- Speed: 15 knots (28 km/h; 17 mph) (max); 13 knots (24 km/h; 15 mph) (service, two engines); 10 knots (19 km/h; 12 mph) (service, one engine)
- Crew: 14 crew; up to 26 scientists
- Aviation facilities: Helideck (1983-1998)

The RV Polar Duke is a 219-foot ice-strengthened research vessel built in 1983. Polar Duke was designed specifically for scientific research with wet and dry laboratories, and an electronic workshop and laboratory. The hull is constructed similar to that of an icebreaker, but the ship isn’t as powerful as an icebreaker. It was originally equipped with a stern A-frame crane and helicopter deck; these were both removed in a major refit in 1998.

Polar Duke was chartered by the National Science Foundation for use in support of the United States Antarctic Program (USAP) from January 1985 until June 1997. The "Duke" transported supplies and personnel between Palmer Station, Antarctica and the port of Punta Arenas, Chile, on the Strait of Magellan, for 13 years, providing seagoing and shore-based research support in waters and islands in the Drake Passage and around the Antarctic Peninsula. In November 1997 Polar Duke was replaced in its role with USAP by the ice strengthened Lawrence M. Gould.

In May 1998, the Polar Duke was rebuilt by its Norwegian owner, Rieber Shipping, as a seismic survey vessel, extending the aft superstructure and converting the helideck to a regular deck. It was assigned to a Rieber subsidiary, Exploration Vessel Resources, which was spun off in 2005 and acquired later that year by CGG, which is now part of CGGVeritas. It was renamed CGG Duke in 2006, and Duke in 2008. The vessel was decommissioned by CGGV in 2009, was reflagged to the Bahamas, and is currently operated by Gardline CGGV, a joint venture between Gardline Geosurvey and CGGVeritas.
