= Shortcut Island =

Island in Antarctica

- Location within Antarctica

Geography
- Location: Antarctica
- Coordinates: 64°47′S 64°07′W
- Archipelago: Palmer Archipelago
- Length: 0.64 km (0.398 mi)

Administration
- Administered under the Antarctic Treaty System

Demographics
- Population: 0

Shortcut Island is a crescent-shaped island 0.64 km (0.4 mi) long, with three prominent indentations of the north shore, lying 1.1 km (0.7 mi) SSE of Gamage Point and Palmer Station along the SW coast of Anvers Island. The suggestive name was given by Palmer Station personnel. The narrow, deep channel separating this island from Anvers Island is a shortcut from the station to the Biscoe Bay area by water.

== See also ==
- Composite Antarctic Gazetteer
- List of Antarctic islands south of 60° S
- SCAR
- Territorial claims in Antarctica
