= Surge Rocks =

Group of rocks in Antarctica

- Location within Antarctica

Geography
- Location: Anvers Island
- Coordinates: 64°47′S 64°4′W
- Total islands: 5

Administration
- Antarctica

Demographics
- Population: Uninhabited

Additional information
- Named by Palmer Station personnel in 1972. Notable for ocean swells causing water surges.

Surge Rocks (64°47′S 64°4′W) are a group of five rocks in Antarctica. Of the five rocks, two are always exposed above water.

They are located 190 metres (0.1 nmi) southwest of Eichorst Island and 1 kilometre (0.6 nmi) south-southeast of Bonaparte Point, Anvers Island. The name was suggested by Palmer Station personnel in 1972. Ocean swells working on the shoal surrounding these rocks, cause breaking and a "surge" of the water level in any weather condition.
