= Hero Inlet =

Body of water in Graham Land, Antarctica

Hero Inlet (64°46′S 64°4′W) is a narrow inlet at the south side of Palmer Station between Gamage Point and Bonaparte Point, along the southwest side of Anvers Island in Antarctica. It was named by the Advisory Committee on Antarctic Names after the Research Vessel Hero which, during the 1960s and 1970s, used the inlet as a turning basin when docking at Palmer Station.
