= Gamage Point =

Headland

Coordinates: 64°46′S 64°4′W

Gamage Point is a rock point that marks the north side of the entrance to Hero Inlet on the southwest side of Anvers Island in Antarctica. The United States Antarctic Research Program Palmer Station is located on this point. The name, applied by the Advisory Committee on Antarctic Names, is in association with Hero Inlet inasmuch as it was the Harvey F. Gamage shipyard in South Bristol, Maine, that built the research vessel Hero.
