= RV Laurence M. Gould =

Research vessel built in 1997

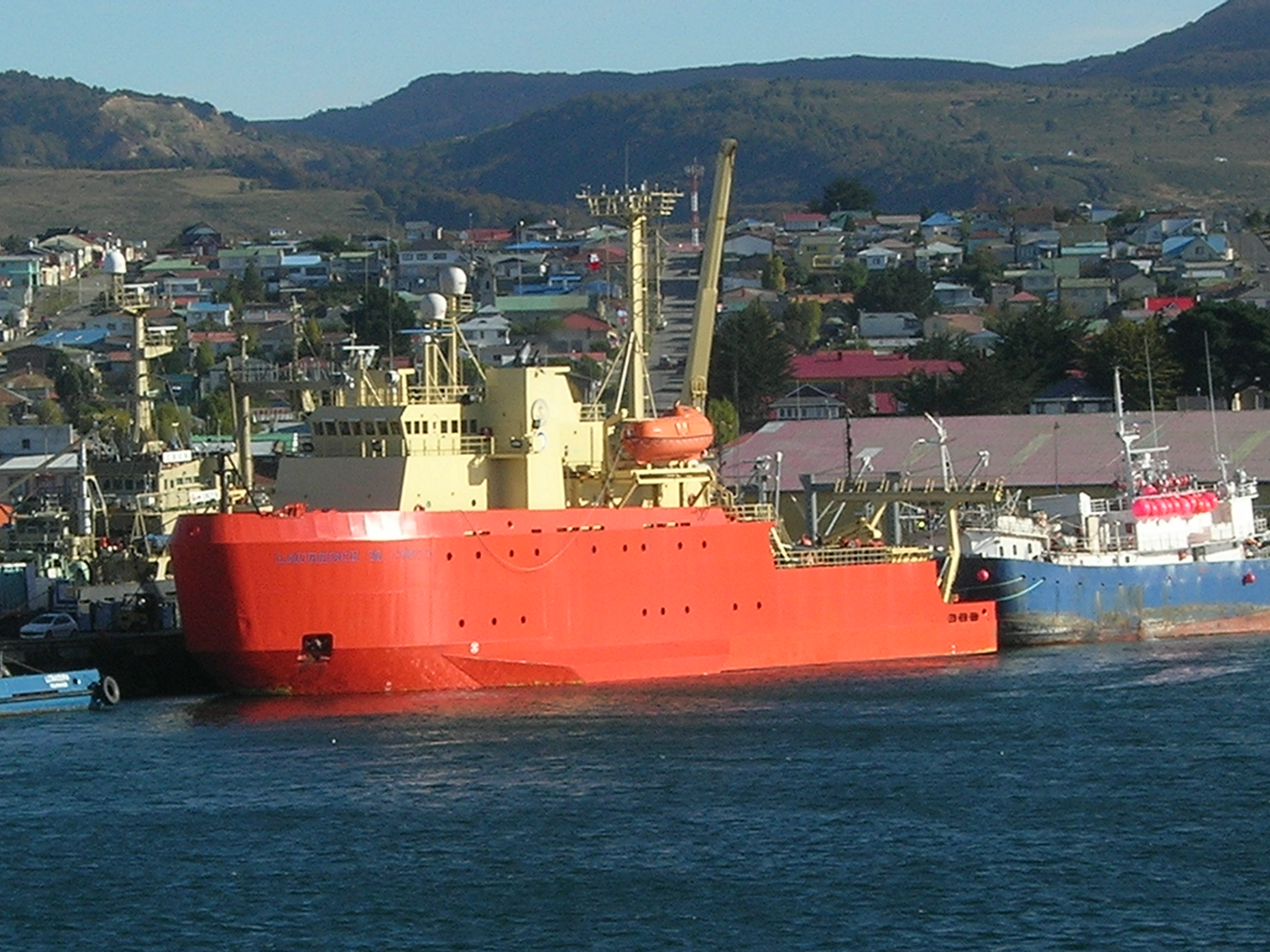
- RV Laurence M. Gould in Punta Arenas, Chile.

History

United States
- Name: RV Laurence M. Gould
- Namesake: Laurence McKinley Gould
- Owner: Edison Chouest Offshore
- Operator: Antarctic Support Contract for the National Science Foundation.
- Builder: North American Shipbuilding Company
- Yard number: 154
- Laid down: 1994
- Launched: 1997
- Decommissioned: 2024
- Home port: Punta Arenas, Patagonia
- Identification: IMO number: 9137337; MMSI number: 368138000; Callsign: WCX7445
- Status: In service

General characteristics
- Type: Antarctic Research & Supply Vessel (Subchapter U)
- Tonnage: 2,966 GT
- Length: 70 m (230 ft)
- Beam: 17 m (56 ft)
- Draught: (Loadline): 19.417 ft (5.9 m)
- Ice class: ABS A1
- Installed power: 2 × Caterpillar 3606 diesel engines, 4,575 hp (3,412 kW)
- Speed: 11.3 knots (20.9 km/h; 13.0 mph) (max) / 8.6 knots (15.9 km/h; 9.9 mph) (average)
- Endurance: 75 days
- Complement: 26 research scientists

RV Laurence M. Gould is an icebreaker that was used by researchers from the United States' National Science Foundation for research in the Southern Ocean from 1998 to 2024. The vessel is named after Laurence McKinley Gould, an American scientist who had explored both the Arctic and Antarctic. He was second in command of Admiral Richard E. Byrd's first expedition to Antarctica from 1928 to 1930. He helped to set up an exploration base at Little America on the Ross Ice Shelf at the Bay of Whales.

Gould died in 1995 at the age of 98, and in the same year the National Science Foundation initiated the charter for the services of this ice-strengthened vessel to further its studies and knowledge of the Antarctic Peninsula and Southern Ocean.

The ARSV Laurence M. Gould was operated by the Antarctic Support Contract (ASC) on a long-term charter from Edison Chouest Offshore (ECO). ASC staffed the vessel with a charter representative to coordinate cruise planning and scheduling, and with technical staff to support science operations. ECO provides the vessel master, ice pilot, and crew.

The vessel charter with Edison-Chouest Offshore expired July 16, 2024 with the National Science Foundation’s Office of Polar Programs announcing in April 2024 that the charter would not be renewed on conclusion of the 2023-24 Antarctic season. The United States Antarctic Program confirmed the end of the Gould's commission in August 2024.

The Gould, completed in 1998, is 230 feet long and is ice-classed ABS-A1, capable of breaking one foot of level ice with continuous forward motion. The Gould can accommodate 37 scientists and staff in one- and two-person staterooms. The Gould acted as a resupply ship and does long term environmental research in the Drake Passage and the Antarctic Peninsula, shuttling between Punta Arenas, Chile and Palmer Station, Antarctica. She replaced the RV Polar Duke as the main supply ship to Palmer Station.

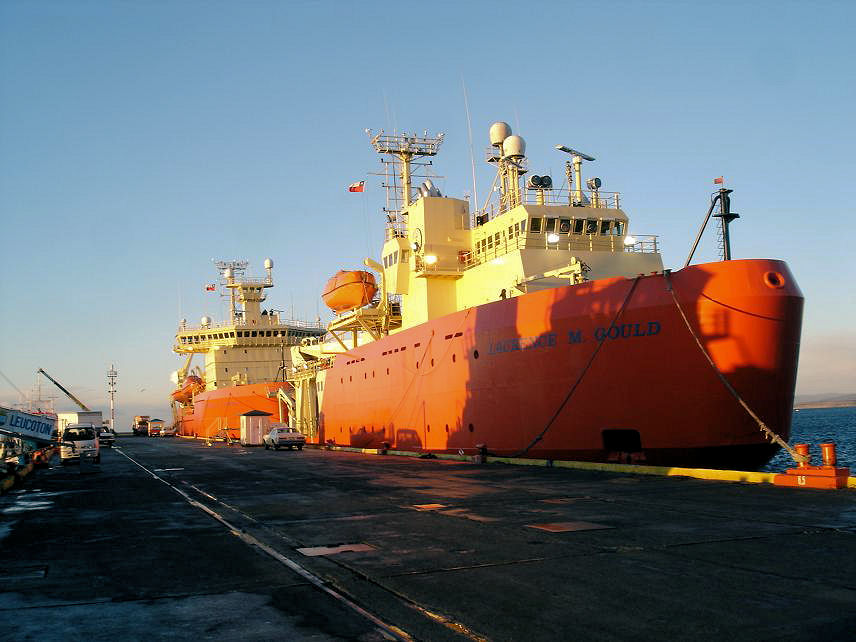
The Laurence M. Gould docked at Punta Arenas, Chile, alongside her older and bigger sister ship, the Nathaniel B. Palmer

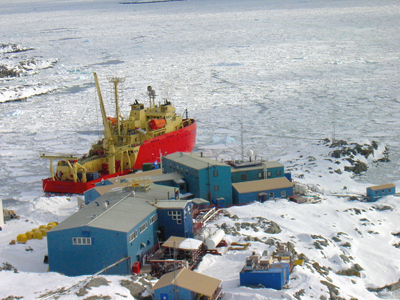
RV Laurence M. Gould at Palmer Station

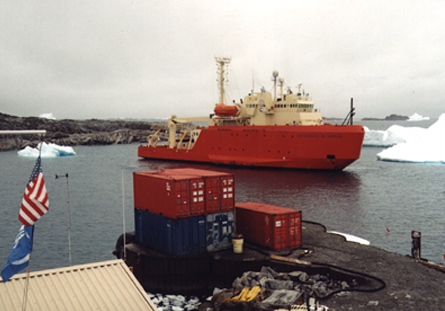
RV Laurence.M. Gould in Arthur Harbor
