= United States Antarctic Program =

American government initiative

United States Antarctic Program (USAP)

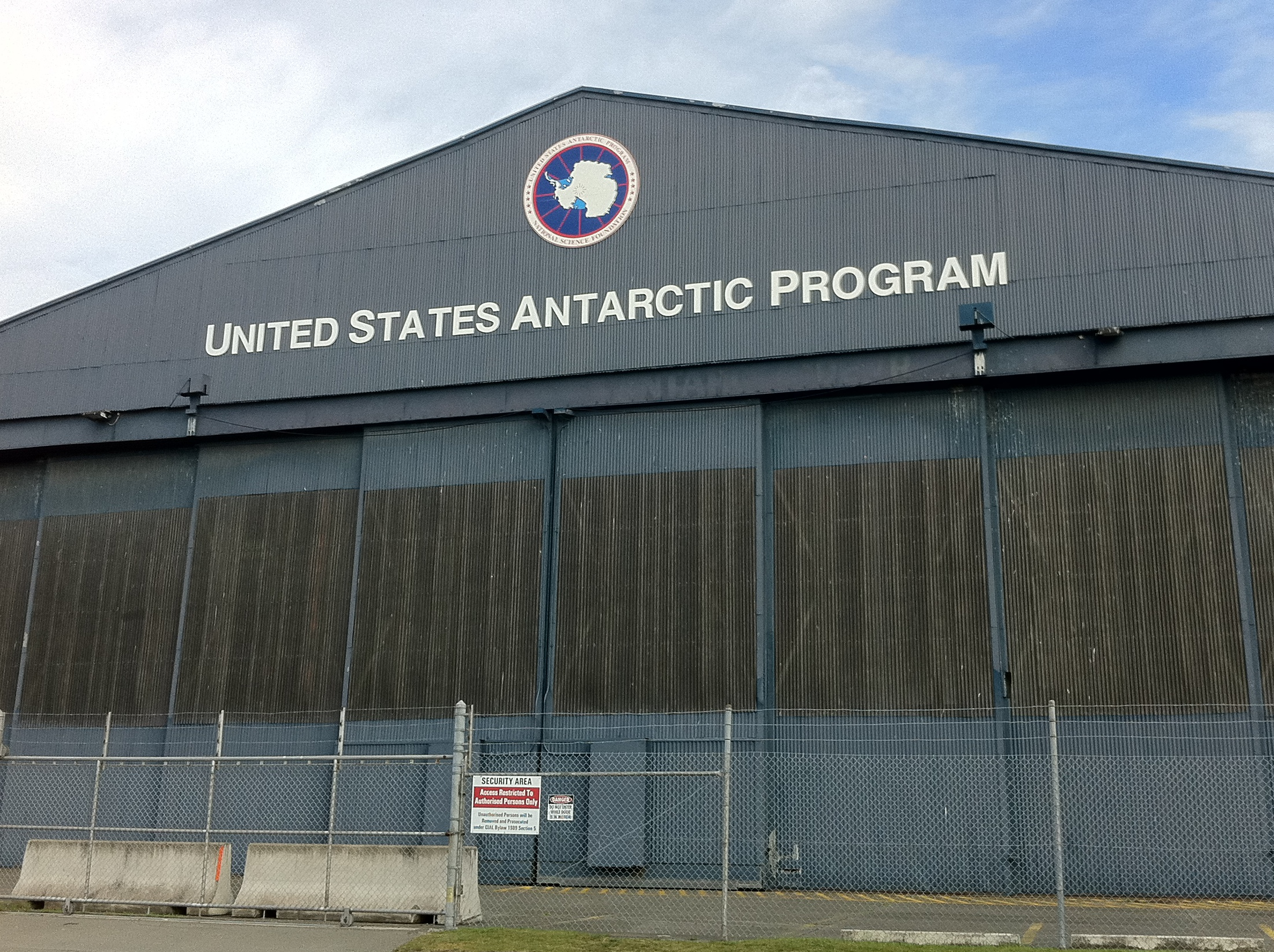
- USAP hangar at Christchurch International Airport, Christchurch, New Zealand

Government agency overview
- Formed: 1959; 67 years ago
- Preceding agencies: United States Antarctic Research Program; United States Antarctic Service
- Headquarters: Alexandria, Virginia
- Employees: 3,000 (seasonal maximum)
- Annual budget: US$356 million (FY2008)
- Parent Government agency: National Science Foundation, Office of Polar Programs
- Website: usap.gov

Map
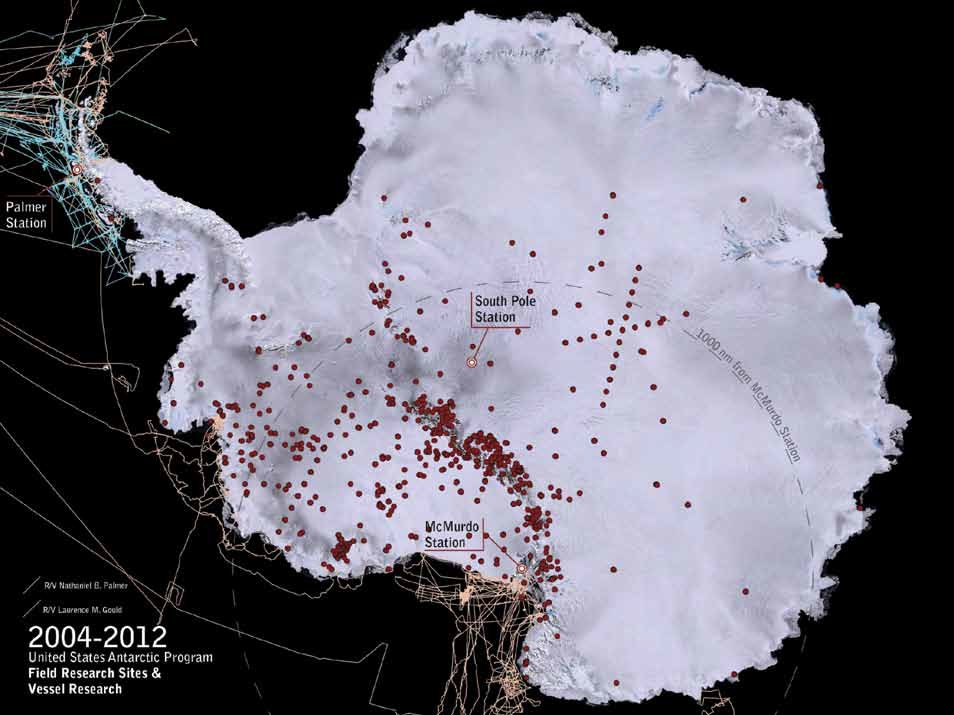
- Map of Antarctica showing USAP field research sites and research vessels

The United States Antarctic Program (or USAP; formerly known as the United States Antarctic Research Program or USARP and the United States Antarctic Service or USAS) is an organization of the United States government which has a presence in the Antarctica continent. Founded in 1959, the USAP manages all U.S. scientific research and related logistics in Antarctica as well as aboard ships in the Southern Ocean.

== Background ==
=== Early U.S. expeditions to Antarctica ===
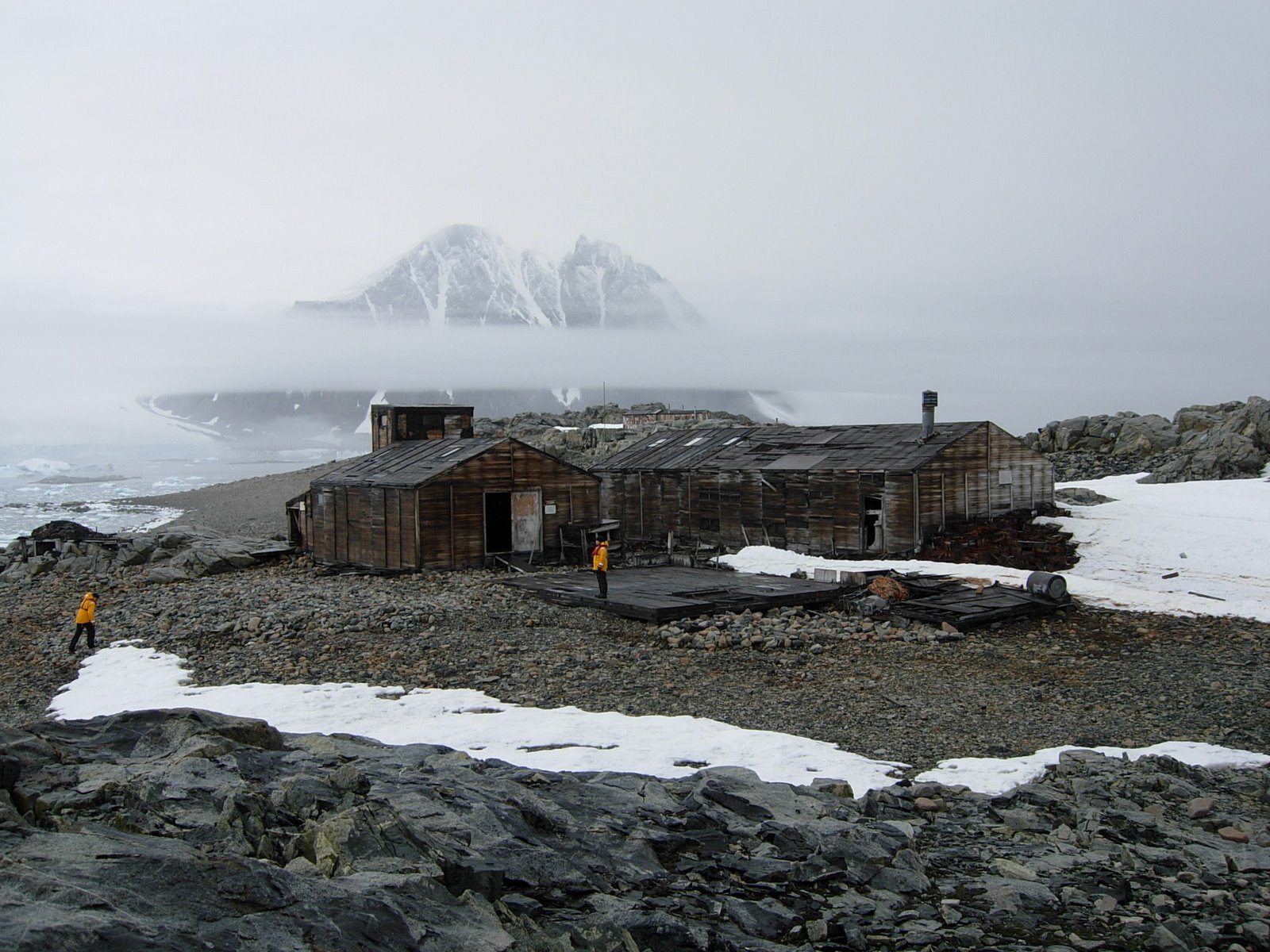
The old East Base on Stonington Island, built in 1939, seen here in 2007

The first Americans to work in the Antarctic were sealers and whalers who discovered many sub-Antarctic islands. They were first to explore parts of the great peninsula jutting out of the Antarctic mainland toward South America. Among them was Nathaniel Palmer, who was among the first to see Antarctica, while on board the Hero in 1820, though historians have not settled the question of who discovered Antarctica. James Eights, a geologist from Albany, New York, became the first U.S. scientist to work in Antarctica. In 1830, aboard the Annawan, Eights made investigations in the South Shetland Islands and westward along the Antarctic Peninsula.

Expeditions sponsored by several nations approached the Antarctic continent early in the 19th century. Among the leaders was Charles Wilkes, a U.S. Navy lieutenant who commanded an expedition in 1839–40 that was the first to prove the existence of the continent. His expedition mapped about 2,400 km (1,500 mi) of the Antarctic coastline in the Indian and Australian quadrants.

In 1928–1930 and 1933–1935, Admiral Richard E. Byrd led two privately sponsored expeditions, one that included the first flight over the South Pole in 1929, sparking U.S. interest in Antarctica. The U.S. Antarctic Service Expedition (1939–1940), under the leadership of the U.S. Navy, maintained bases at Marguerite Bay and Bay of Whales.

Operation Highjump in 1946–1947 was the largest single expedition ever to explore Antarctica, involving 13 naval vessels, numerous airplanes and more than 4,700 men. The next year, the Navy's Operation Windmill used helicopters to complete some of the work begun during Highjump.

=== The International Geophysical Year and the Antarctic Treaty ===
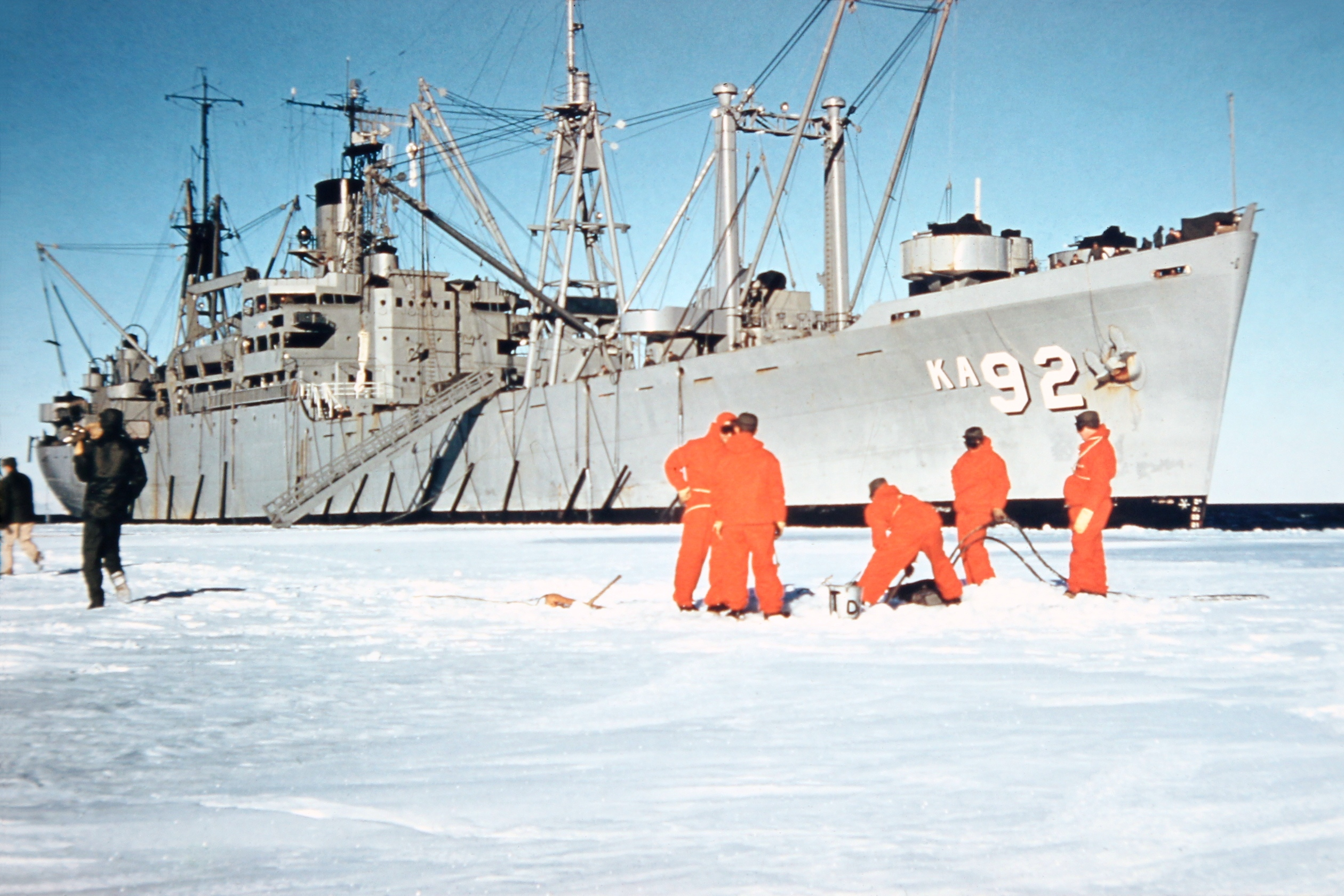
USS Wyandot mooring at McMurdo Station (December 1955)

In 1956–57 the U.S. Navy, during Operation Deep Freeze I, and in conjunction with research teams funded by the National Science Foundation, established seven research stations in Antarctica to prepare for the International Geophysical Year (IGY, 1957–58). The IGY was an intensive, multi-national, multi-disciplinary, global research effort designed to study a wide range of geophysical processes. Much of that effort took place in Antarctica and was crucial in establishing Antarctica as a continent for peace and science.

The international coordination that resulted from the IGY ultimately lead to the Antarctic Treaty, which was signed in 1959. Since then, Treaty nations have agreed to several addenda, including the 1991 Environmental Protocol to the Antarctic Treaty which establishes rules and procedures specifically designed to protect the Antarctic environment. The Protocol was ratified and went into effect in 1998.

== History ==
=== Establishment ===
The United States established the U.S. Antarctic Research Program (USARP) in 1959—the name was later changed to the U.S. Antarctic Program—immediately following the success of the International Geophysical Year (IGY). Today, the National Science Foundation (NSF) has a Presidential Mandate to manage the United States Antarctic Program, through which it operates three year-round research stations and two research vessels, coordinates all U.S. science on the southernmost continent, and works with other federal agencies, the U.S. military, and civilian contractors, to provide the necessary logistical support for the science.

The U.S. is a signatory to the Antarctic Treaty and the conduct of science is the principal expression of U.S. interest in the Antarctic.

In October 1970, President Richard Nixon stated U.S. policy for Antarctica to be:

To maintain the Antarctic Treaty and ensure that this continent will continue to be used only for peaceful purposes and shall not become an area or object of international discord; to foster cooperative scientific research for the solution of worldwide and regional problems, including environmental monitoring and prediction and assessment of resources; and to protect the Antarctic environment and develop appropriate measures to ensure the equitable and wise use of living and non-living resources... Science has provided a successful basis for international accord, and the Antarctic is the only continent where science serves as the principal expression of national policy and interest.

In 1970 and again in 1976 National Security Decision Memoranda (71 and 318) reaffirmed the "importance of maintaining an active and influential U.S. presence in the Antarctic that is 'responsive to U.S. scientific, economic, and political objectives.'"

In February 1982 President Ronald Reagan in White House Memorandum 6646 reaffirmed the prior policy and noted that the presence in Antarctica shall include "the conduct of scientific activities in major disciplines" and "year-round occupation of the South Pole and two coastal stations".

On June 9 1994, Presidential Decision Directive NSC 26 ("United States Policy on the Arctic and Antarctic Regions") stated that U.S. policy toward Antarctica has four fundamental objectives: (1) protecting the relatively unspoiled environment of Antarctica and its associated ecosystems, (2) preserving and pursuing unique opportunities for scientific research to understand Antarctica and global physical and environmental systems, (3) maintaining Antarctica as an area of international cooperation reserved exclusively for peaceful purposes, and (4) assuring the conservation and sustainable management of the living resources in the oceans surrounding Antarctica.

An April 1996 report, U.S. Antarctic Program, by the president's National Science and Technology Council, directed the establishment of the present Panel and reaffirmed that essential elements of U.S. national and scientific interests are well served by continued involvement in scientific activity in the Arctic as carried out by the U.S. Antarctic Program. The report states that policies in the 1982 memorandum continue to be appropriate at the current funding level and that present U.S. policy and practice with respect to the U.S. Antarctic Program are well justified.

=== AIMS ===
The Antarctic Infrastructure Modernization for Science (AIMS) is a ten-year construction project to upgrade and update McMurdo Station's infrastructure. Starting in 2021, the project will build about 370,000 square feet of new facilities, while razing several of the station's aging structures.

=== Allegations of sexual harassment and assault ===
In April 2021, the National Science Foundation Office of Polar Programs entered into an agreement with the Department of the Interior's Federal Consulting Group to oversee a needs assessment of the USAP as relates to allegations of sexual harassment and assault. The Sexual Assault/Harassment Prevention and Response (SAHPR) Report was published on June 22, 2022. The report utilized focus groups and surveys from community members to paint a picture of the situation on-ice, and details response and prevention suggestions.

In response to the SAHPR report, the U.S. Congressional Committee on Science, Space, and Technology held a hearing on December 6, 2022, called "Building A Safer Antarctic Research Environment", and the NSF's Office of the Inspector General released a related report on March 7, 2023, titled "Law Enforcement Perspectives on Sexual Assault and Stalking Issues Pertaining to the United States Antarctic Program".

At the hearing, a Leidos representative testified before Congress that Leidos had received "zero allegations of sexual assault" between May 2017 and April 2022, despite the SAHPR report mentioning dozens of such instances. A statement put out by the House committee in May 2023 found Leidos' claim to be "untrue" and that "efforts to purposefully provide inaccurate information to Congress and to obstruct NSF OIG's investigation into this matter cannot be allowed."

In 2024, the committee concluded that "investigating and adjudicating reports of harassment and assault became an exercise in passing the buck, and subcontractors—whom the Committee often found to be untrained and unprofessional—were able to make final decisions with absolutely no oversight or consistency. In conclusion, the inconsistency in company policies, the lack of oversight by Leidos and NSF, and poor communication among all entities operating in the USAP created an unsafe environment..." The letter included exhibits from several contractors and sub-contractors, including Leidos and Gana A-'Yoo Services Corporation (GSC).

=== Alcohol policies ===
In 2023, alcohol sales at station bars were banned. Alcohol was still available for purchase in the station stores, though weekly rations were steadily decreased for several years. The NSF claimed that these changes were for "morale and welfare".

In 2025, all hard liquor was banned from the program. Only beer and wine will be sold and staff are banned from bringing their own alcohol.

=== Class action lawsuit ===
On January 6, 2025, a former USAP contractor filed a class-action lawsuit in the United States District Court for the District of Colorado alleging private federal contractors systematically suppressed wages, retaliated against workers who raised concerns about mistreatment and health and safety issues, and entered into illegal no-poach agreements.

=== Budget cuts ===
The Trump administration's proposed FY2026 would cut 55% of the National Science Foundation's budget. This resulted in significant layoffs of fulltime USAP staff, cuts and cancellations to science, delaying and cancelling construction projects, and the decommissioning of the program's only research vessel.

== Facilities and vessels ==
The U.S. Antarctic Program operates three year-round research stations. Additional temporary field camps are constructed and operated during the austral summer.

=== McMurdo Station ===
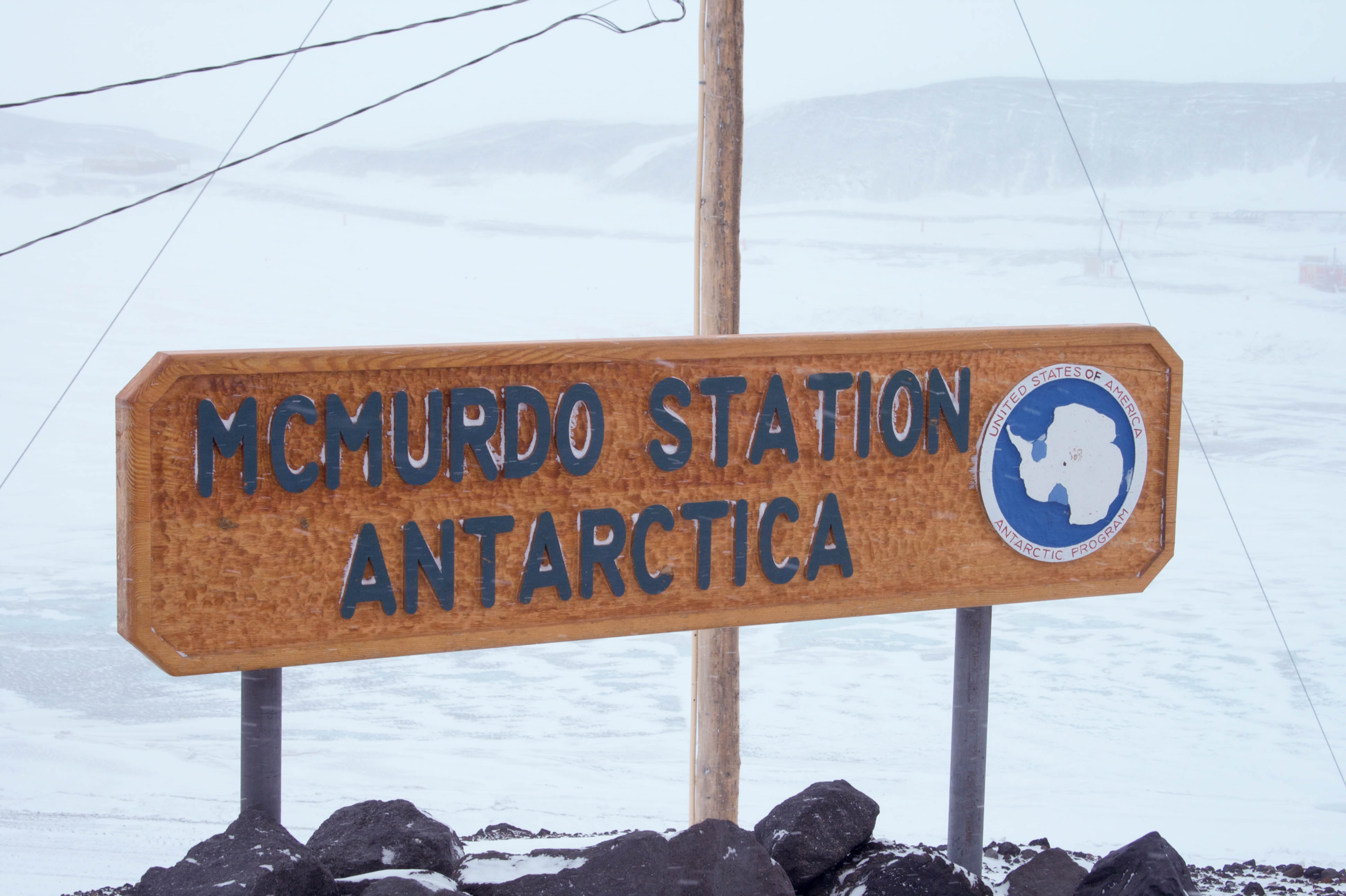
McMurdo Station sign

McMurdo Station (77°51' S, 166°40' E), the largest research station in Antarctica by population, is situated on barren volcanic hills at the southern tip of Ross Island, about 3,827 km (2,378 mi) south of Christchurch, New Zealand and 1,350 km (840 mi) north of the South Pole. The station sits on the eastern shore of McMurdo Sound, the southernmost body of seasonally open water in the world. Mount Erebus, a 3,794-meter (12,448 ft) high active volcano, towers over Ross Island. On the west side of the Sound, the Royal Society Range and Mount Discovery, an extinct volcano, provide spectacular vistas. The mean annual temperature is −18 °C (0 °F). Temperatures may reach as high as 8 °C (46 °F) in summer and −50 °C (−58 °F) in winter. The average wind speed is 12 knots (22 km/h; 14 mph), but winds have exceeded 100 knots (190 km/h; 120 mph).

McMurdo Sound is a historic area. In 1841, James Clark Ross brought his ships HMS Erebus and HMS Terror into the Sound, farther south than anyone had ever gone, before sailing eastward along a great wall of ice. He and his crew were the first humans to see the island and the ice shelf that both now bear his name. In 1902, Robert F. Scott wintered HMS Discovery in Winter Quarters Bay, adjacent to the station. Both of Scott's (1901–1904 and 1910–1913) and Ernest Shackleton's (1907–1909 and 1914–1916) expeditions used the area as a base to deploy sledging parties for both scientific exploration and attempts to reach the South Pole. The huts these expeditions built still stand today at Hut Point, Cape Evans, and Cape Royds.

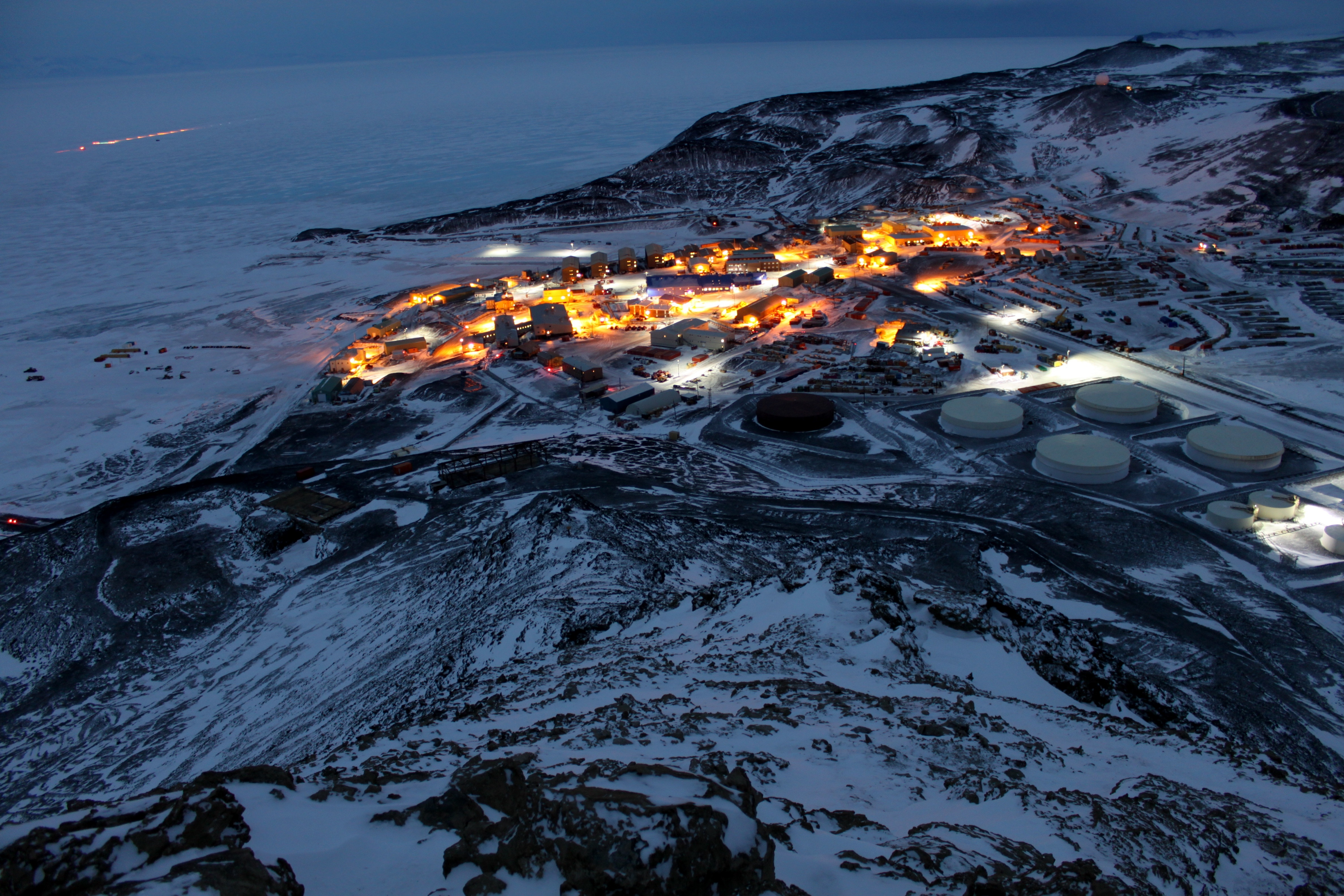
McMurdo at night in October 2010, about the time the seasons switched from all-day darkness to winter light

The original station was constructed in 1955–1956. With many additions and modernizations over the years, today's station is the primary logistics facility for airborne and overland resupply of inland stations and field science projects. The station is also the waste management center for much of the USAP.

McMurdo has two airfields. Phoenix Airfield, located about 18 km (11 mi) from McMurdo on the McMurdo Ice Shelf, accommodates wheeled aircraft. Williams Field Skiway, located about 15 km (9.3 mi) from McMurdo is for ski-equipped aircraft only. McMurdo also has a heliport to support helicopter operations.

Approximately 90% of USAP participants live in or pass through McMurdo Station. The austral winter population ranges from 150 to 200, with the summer population varying between 800 and 1,000. The station has routine weekly flights to and from New Zealand during the austral summer (October–February), a period called "Mainbody", with fewer flights during the winter months (March–September).

=== Amundsen–Scott South Pole Station ===
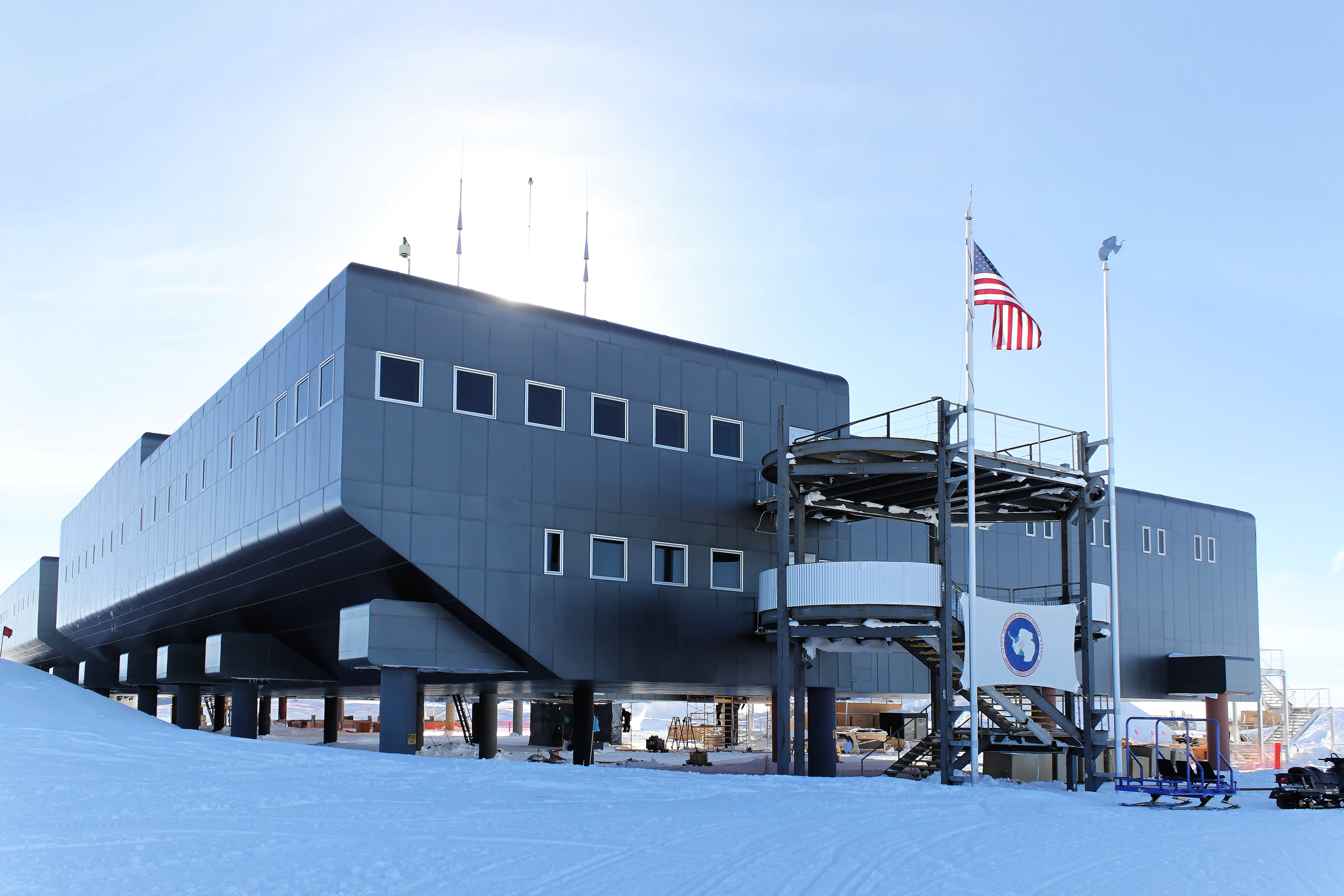
Facilities at South Pole Station in 21st century

Amundsen–Scott South Pole Station is located at the geographic South Pole, on the polar plateau, at an elevation of 2,835 m (9,300 ft) above sea level. The station sits on an ice sheet that is 2,700 m (8,858 ft) thick and drifts with the ice at about 10 m (33 ft) a year toward the Weddell Sea.

The mean annual temperature is –49 °C (–56 °F). Average monthly temperatures range from –28 °C (–18 °F) in the summer to –60 °C (–76 °F) in winter. The record high of – 12.3 °C (9.9 °F) was recorded in December 2011, and the record low of –82.8 °C (–117 °F) was recorded in June 1982. The site has very low humidity, and precipitation is only about 20 cm of snow (8 cm water equivalent) per year. Drifting is the primary cause of snow accumulation around buildings. Average wind speed is 10.8 knots.

The original station was built in 1956–1957 and is buried beneath the ice. A second station, located under a geodesic dome, was completed in 1975. The Dome was dismantled in 2009–10 and removed from the continent. The current station was dedicated on January 12, 2008. The winter population is around 45, and the summer population averages 150.

Most Antarctic Program personnel and cargo reach the South Pole from McMurdo Station via LC-130 ski-equipped aircraft, whereas most fuel is transported via surface traverse from McMurdo Station. The short austral summer, when most activity occurs, is from late October through mid-February. The station is isolated for the rest of the year.

Research at the South Pole includes astronomy, astrophysics, aeronomy, auroral and geospace studies, meteorology, geomagnetism, seismology, earth-tide measurements, and glaciology.

=== Palmer Station ===
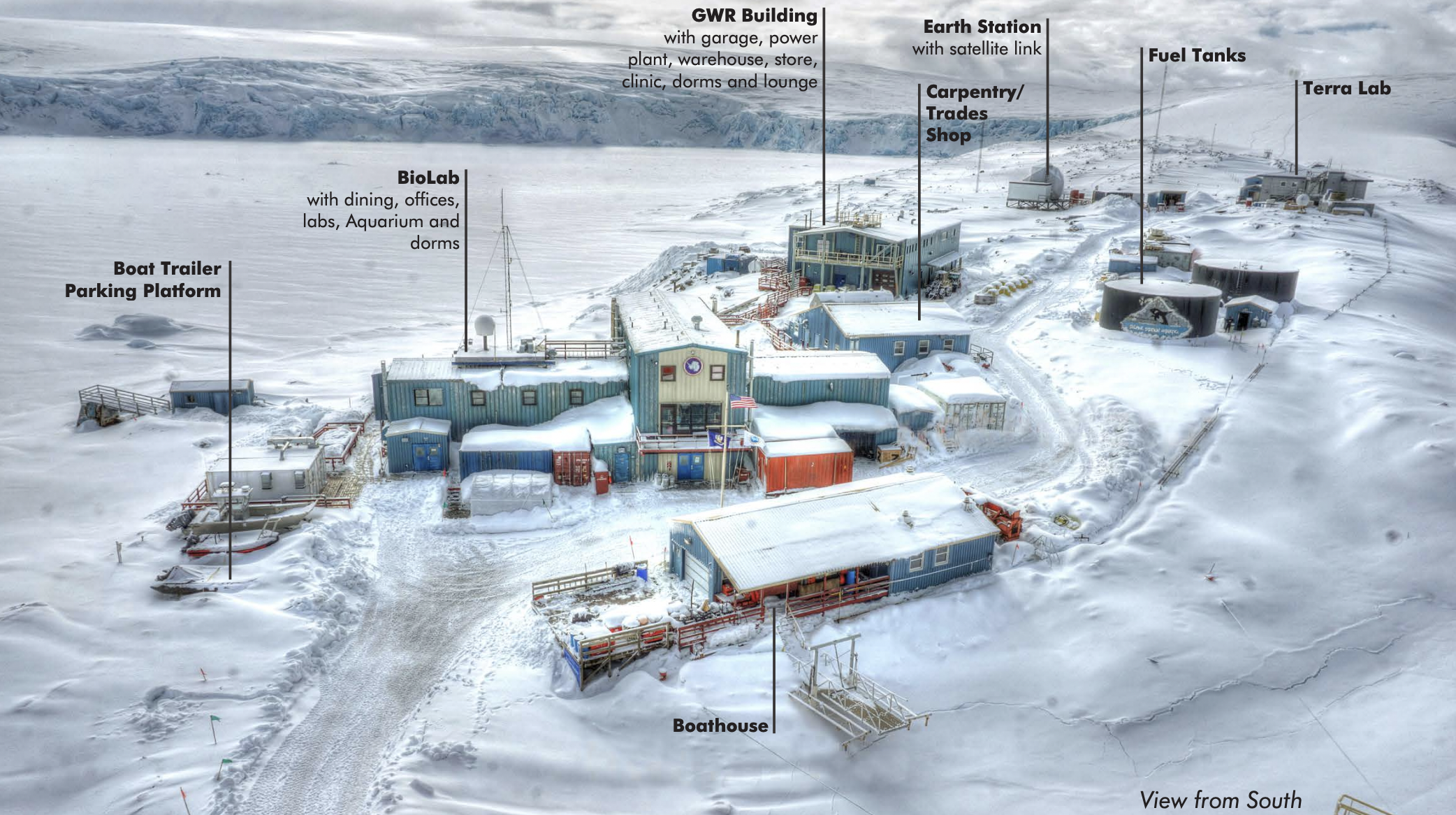
Palmer Station infographic

Palmer Station, on the Antarctic Peninsula region, is named after Nathaniel B. Palmer, the American sailor who pioneered the exploration of the Peninsula in 1820. The station is located on Anvers Island at 64°46' S, 64°03' W and consists of two major buildings and several small ones. There is no airfield.

Located just north of the Antarctic Circle, the climate is milder than that of the other U.S. Antarctic stations. Temperatures in the summer range from just below freezing to above 4 °C (40 °F). Winter temperatures range from 0 °C (32 °F) to -10 °C (14 °F). Palmer Station is often windy and wet, with both snow and rain. The water equivalent in snow and rain averages 81 cm (32 in) per year. Wildlife is abundant near the station, which makes it superbly located for ecosystem research.

The station population is about 44 in the summer and 20 or more in winter. Unlike the South Pole and McMurdo stations, Palmer usually receives transportation year-round and does not generally have a period of winter isolation.

=== Research vessels ===
As of 2026, the United States Antarctic Program no longer operates an Antarctic research vessel. Prior to 2024, it had two.

ASRV Laurence M. Gould was 70 m (230 ft) long and was capable of breaking one foot (0.30 m) of first-year ice while maintaining continuous forward progress. Lawrence M. Gould had berthing space to accommodate 28 scientists and ASC personnel. There were an additional nine bunks for passengers transiting to Palmer Station. Lawrence M. Gould transported personnel and cargo to and from Palmer Station and supported research in the Antarctic Peninsula region. It was decommissioned in 2024.

RVIB Nathaniel B. Palmer was 94 m (308 ft) long and was able to break three feet (0.91 m) of ice at a continuous forward speed of three knots (5.6 km/h; 3.5 mph). Nathanial B. Palmer was a multi-disciplinary research vessel containing six laboratories with a combined space of 353.5 m^{2} (3,805 sq ft). It could accommodate 39 scientists and ASC personnel and operated throughout the Southern Ocean. In 2025, facing budget cuts proposed by the Trump administration, the National Science Foundation terminated the lease of the Nathaniel B. Palmer.

=== Field camps ===
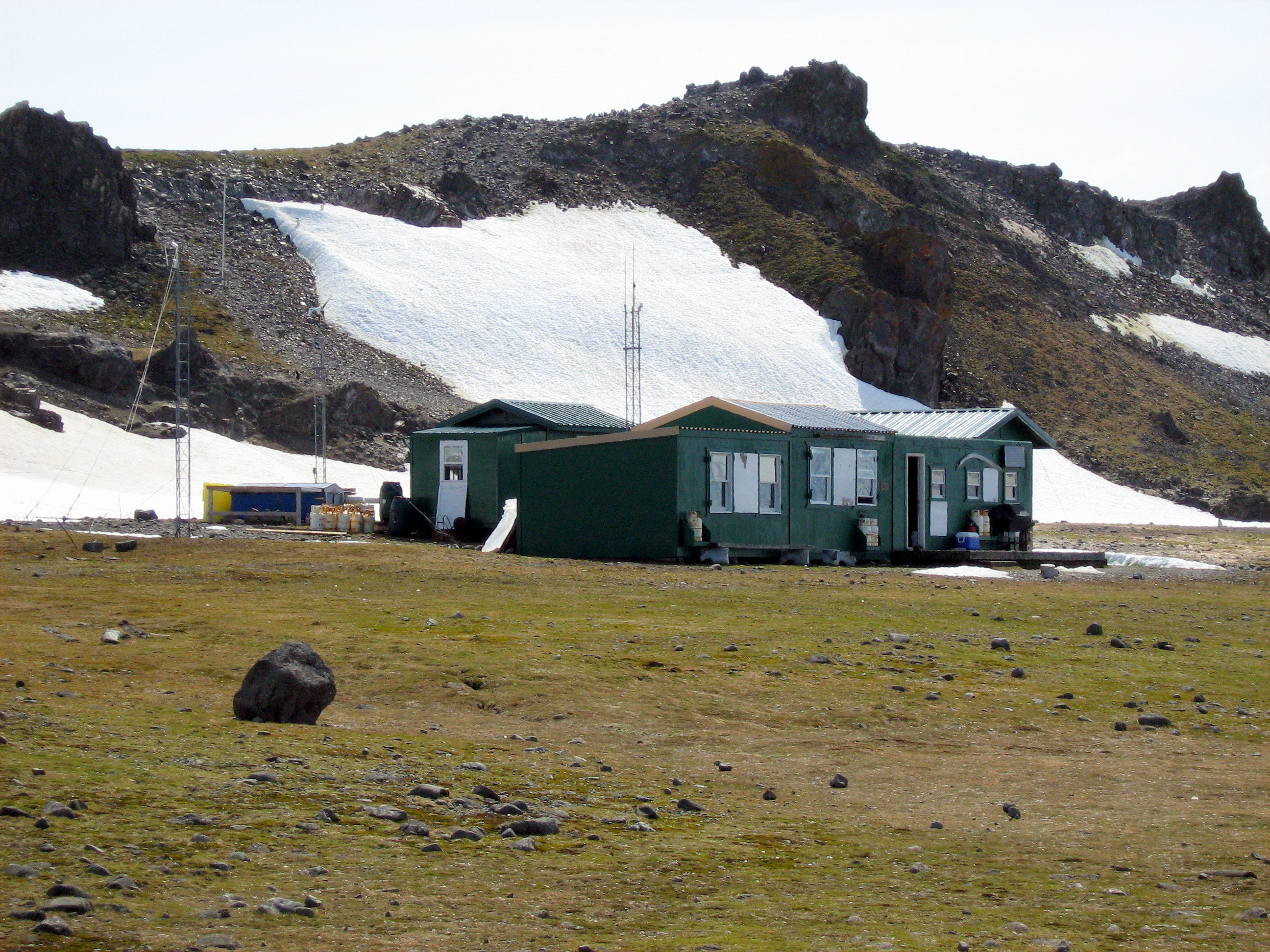
Captain Pieter J. Lenie summer hut on Copacabana Beach, King George Island

Every season the Program establishes several dozen field camps to house researchers and support staff around the continent. These range in size from just two or three people in small pitched tents, to large camps of up to 60 people in temporary shelters, to permanent, hard-walled structures that teams return to year after year.

== Programs ==
=== Astrophysics and Geospace ===
The Astrophysics and Geospace Sciences Program sponsors research areas that either use Antarctica as an observing platform or contribute to an understanding of the role played by the Antarctic upper atmosphere in global environmental processes.

=== Organisms and Ecosystems ===
The Organisms and Ecosystems Program supports research at all levels of biological organization, from molecular, cellular and organismal to communities and ecosystems.

=== Earth Sciences ===
The Earth Sciences Program provides insights into Antarctica's geologic history and lead to increased understanding of processes shaping it today.

=== Glaciology ===
The Glaciology Program supports research concerned with the history and dynamics of the Antarctic ice sheet and its surrounding ice shelves. Studies of the processes controlling the mass balance and dynamics of the ice sheet are also important.

=== Ocean and Atmospheric Sciences ===
The Ocean and Atmospheric Sciences Program aims to advance understanding of the physics and chemistry of both oceanic and lower atmospheric processes, and environments at high southern latitudes, and their links at local, regional and global scales across the Antarctic continent and surrounding Southern Ocean.

=== Artists and Writers ===
The Artists and Writers Program supports participants whose work requires them to be in the Antarctic to complete their project, in particular projects that increase understanding and appreciation of the Antarctic and of human activities on the southernmost continent.

=== PolarTREC ===
PolarTREC (Teachers and Researchers Exploring and Collaborating) is an NSF-funded program that brings teachers from the United States to the polar regions to spend three to six weeks participating in hands-on field research experiences. Managed by the Arctic Research Consortium of the United States (ARCUS), the goal is to invigorate polar science education and understanding by bringing educators and polar researchers together.

== Logistics ==
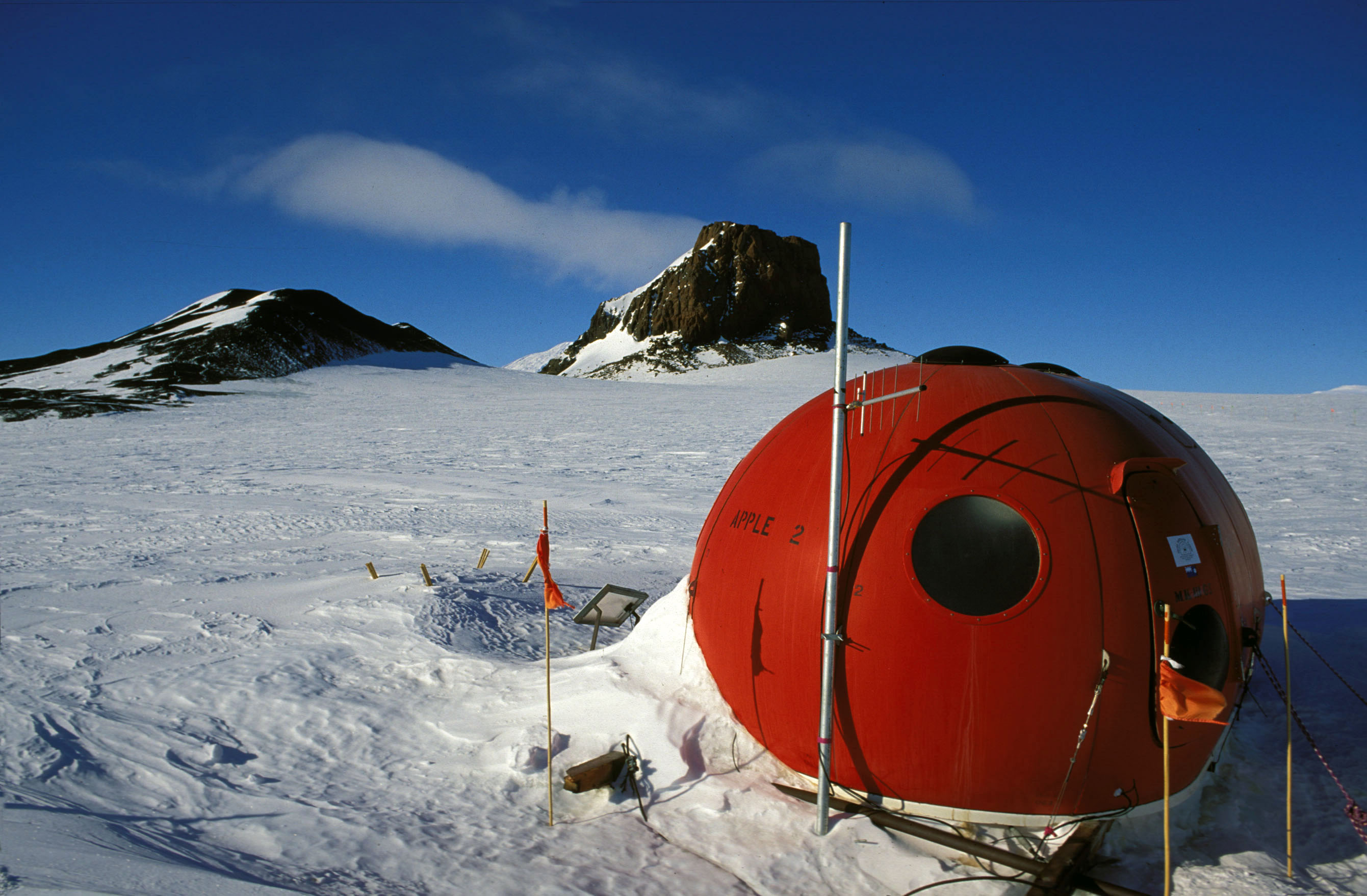
Emergency shelter near McMurdo

Antarctica is the most remote region of the world, with no native inhabitants or infrastructure and nearly no vegetation. Working in such a hostile environment requires specialized systems to keep scientists and support staff safe and equipment operational.

=== Airplanes ===
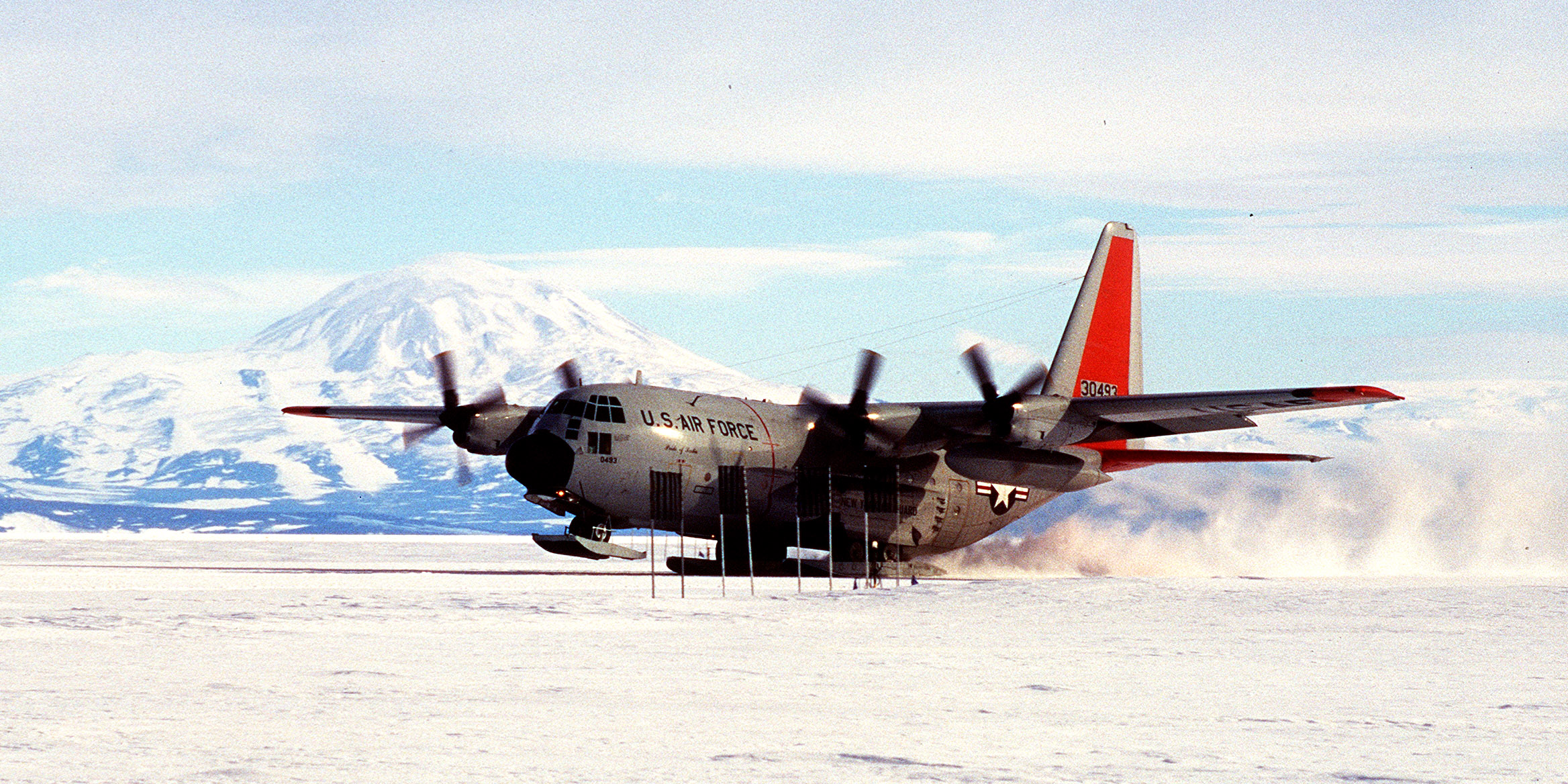
C-130 with skis landing at McMurdo

The Antarctic Program uses a variety of aircraft to transport people and cargo to and from Antarctica, as well as throughout the continent. McMurdo Station maintains two landing strips on the adjacent McMurdo Ice Shelf: Williams Airfield for ski-equipped planes, and Phoenix Airfield for wheeled planes. U.S. Air Force C-17 cargo planes and unique New York Air National Guard ski-equipped LC-130s ferry people and cargo between Christchurch, New Zealand, and McMurdo Station. During the peak of the Antarctic summer, the ice runways are not able to support the weight of wheeled aircraft and only planes that can take off and land on skis can operate.

For transportation across vast distances around the continent, the Program uses a combination of ski-equipped LC-130s and ski-equipped Basler BT-3 and Twin Otter planes through a contract with through Kenn Borek Air, Ltd. Ski-equipped planes can land on groomed and maintained ski runways like those at Amundsen-Scott South Pole Station and other field camps, or in relatively smooth ungroomed snow.

=== Helicopters ===
The program maintains a small fleet of helicopters, under contract, at McMurdo Station to transport people and cargo around the immediate area of the station. Helicopters also carry scientific survey equipment and reconnoiter landing and scientific sites. Occasionally some of the helicopters will be temporarily set up at larger field camps to enable transport around an otherwise inaccessible region. The current helicopter support contract is held by Air Center Helicopters.

=== Traverses ===
Tractor-pulled convoys or "traverses" are used to transport large quantities of fuel and cargo across large distances. Every year three traverses carrying more than 100,000 gallons of fuel drive the 1,600 km (990 mi) from McMurdo Station to Amundsen-Scott South Pole Station to deliver fuel for the next year. Other "science traverses" transport heavy science equipment to field sites hundreds of miles from the station.

=== Vessels/boats ===
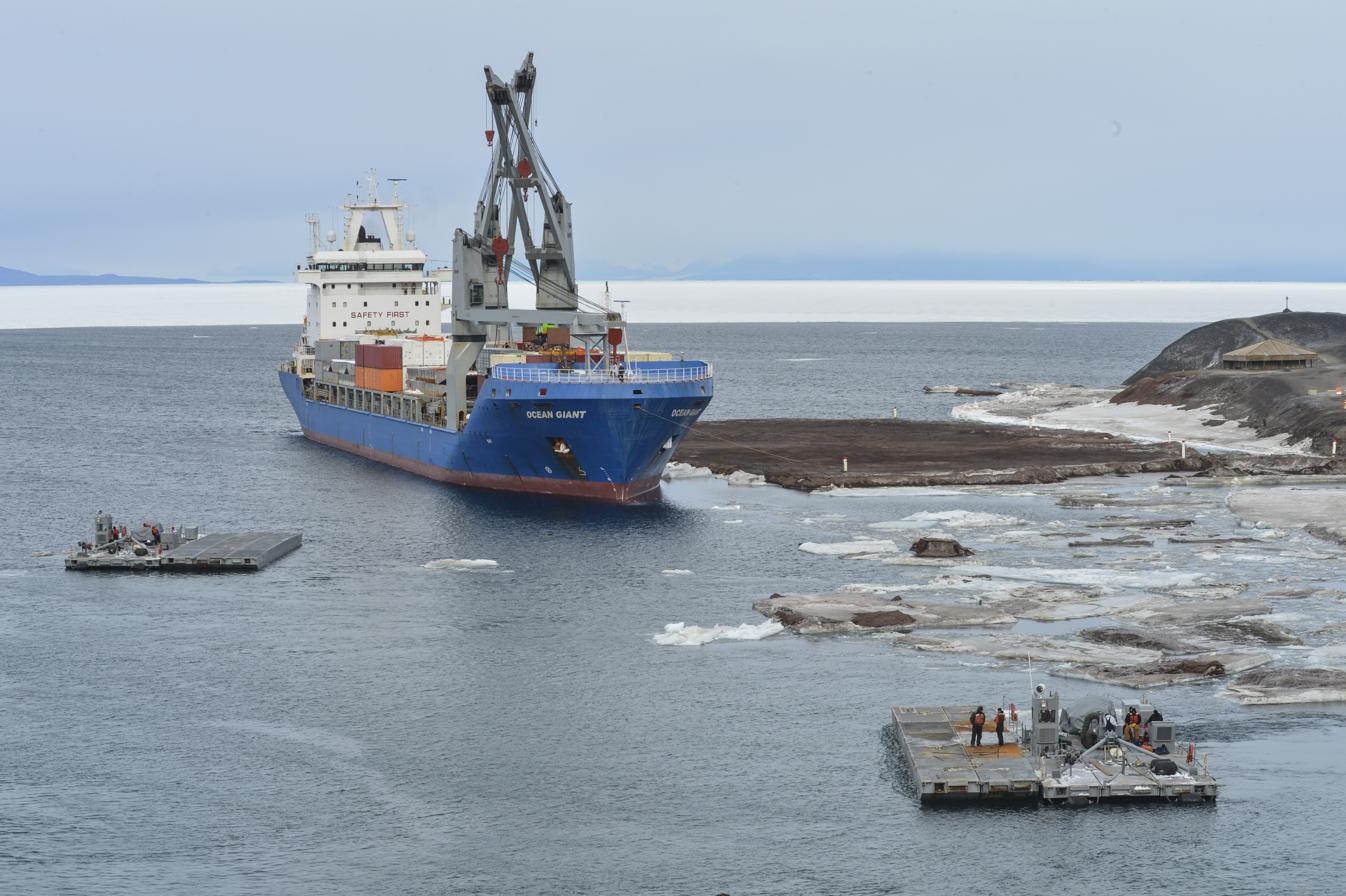
MV Ocean Giant arrives at McMurdo (January 2023)

The program maintains two research vessels, RVIB Nathaniel B. Palmer and ASRV Laurence M. Gould. The ships are used to both transport people and supplies between Palmer Station on the Antarctic Peninsula, and the port at Punta Arenas, Chile, and to embark on longer science-focused voyages to understand the Southern Ocean or visit other remote areas of the continent.

Smaller boats at Palmer Station, including inflatable rafts and larger rigid-hulled inflatable boats, are used to transport scientists around the islands near the station.

McMurdo Station is resupplied by ship at the end of every summer season. The U.S. Coast Guard heavy icebreaker Polar Star cuts a channel for a cargo ship to pass through and reach the ice pier at the station. A fuel tanker usually follows the cargo vessel to deliver fuel.

=== Vehicles and transport ===
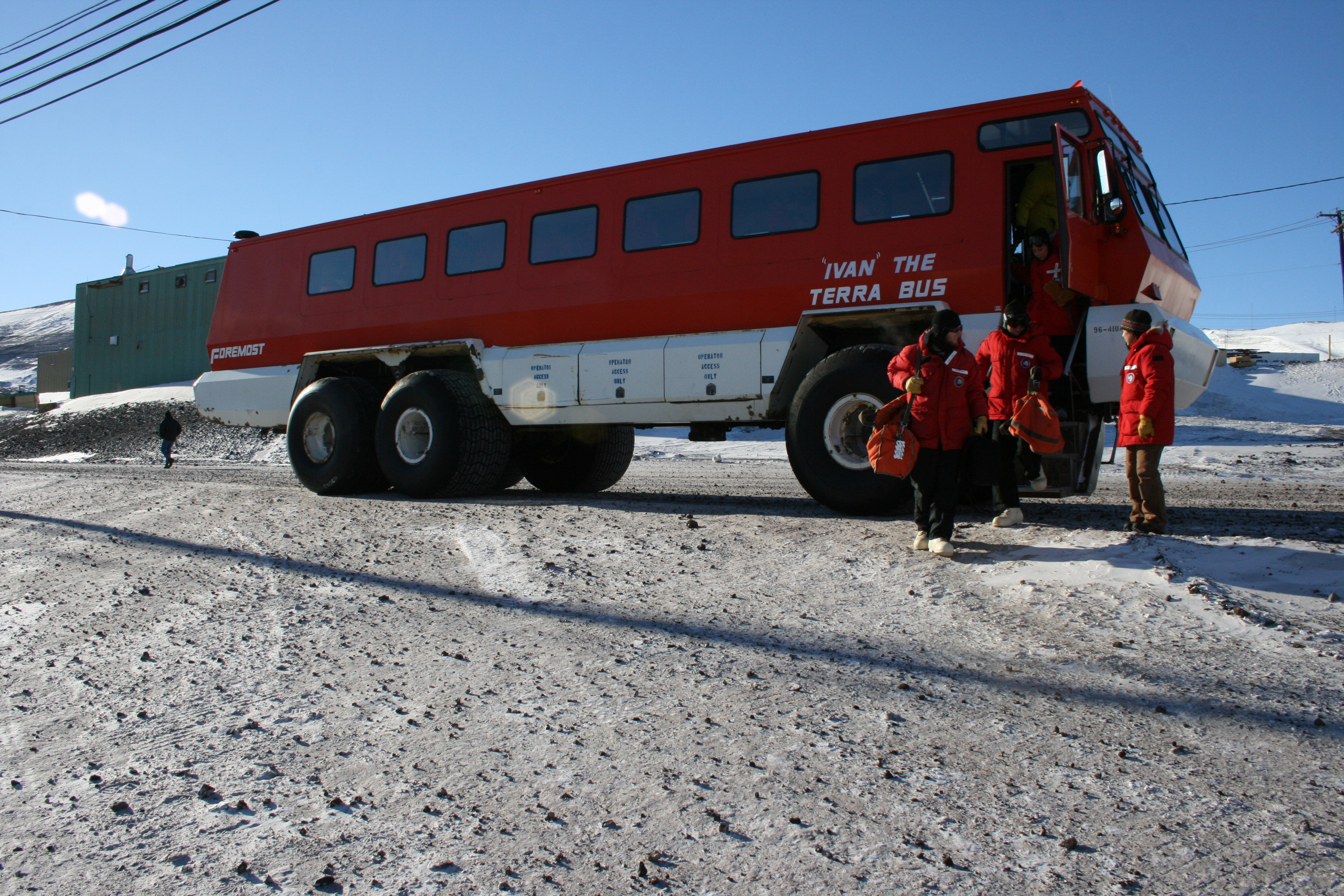
McMurdo's Station Terra Bus, useful for transporting people in snowy conditions

The Program has a fleet of vehicles to meet a range of needs at each station. A variety of large and small loaders are used to move cargo and other heavy equipment around. Tracked vehicles, including PistenBullys and Hagglunds transport people and equipment over snow and ice covered regions. Smaller snowmobiles are also used for transport across snow and ice-covered areas as well. "Ivan the Terra Bus" and the large Kress are used to transport large numbers of people to and from the airfields over the ice roads of McMurdo Station. Passenger vans with wide tires are also used to transport people around McMurdo Station and Amundsen-Scott South Pole station as well. McMurdo Station also has a small fleet of pickup trucks.

=== Power/water/wastewater ===
Each station uses diesel fuel to generate electricity. At McMurdo Station, wind turbines installed by Antarctica New Zealand in 2010 supply about a third of the station's electricity in a cooperative agreement with ANZ. Field camps have been increasingly using solar power, taking advantage of the 24 hours of daylight during the Antarctic summer.

Reverse osmosis is used to desalinate sea water for drinking at McMurdo and Palmer stations. Potable water at Amundsen-Scott South Pole Station, which sits atop an ice sheet nearly three kilometers (two miles) thick, is produced by melting ice.

Wastewater is treated by the base wastewater plant using the activated sludge process. The effluent is sterilized using ultra violet light and discharged back into McMurdo Sound. Waste sludge is dried by being processed with a belt filter press and then boxed up for shipment back to the United States for incineration.

=== Food ===
Each station has its own kitchen and cafeteria. Food is provided free-of-charge to program participants and official visitors. The cafeterias serve breakfast, lunch, dinners, and a midnight meal for the night shift. Each station has a range of rotating entrees. Fresh fruit and vegetables, known colloquially as "freshies", are popular items, but because of their short shelf life are not always available.

Large field camps often have their own chef that cooks large group meals from shelf-stable supplies sent out at the beginning of their field season. At smaller field camps, cooking duties are often shared with other responsibilities amongst camp staff or researchers.

== Agencies and organizations ==
=== National Science Foundation ===
The NSF has overall management responsibility for U.S. activities in Antarctica. Organized through its Office of Polar Programs, it has responsibility for a range of day-to-day functions including preparing an annual budget and operational plans for consideration by the executive branch and for review and appropriation by Congress; obtaining advice from the scientific community, as needed, to develop scientific goals for NSF-supported research in Antarctica; evaluating and supporting proposals for research and education from U.S. universities, other research institutions, and federal agencies; detailed planning of logistics and transmitting logistics requirements, along with necessary funds, to elements of the Department of Defense and the United States Coast Guard; managing facilities, including the planning, design, engineering, construction, and maintenance of Antarctic infrastructure; developing a government support contract and managing a contractor charged with operating Antarctic stations and research vessels and providing related services, including construction; developing and implementing a comprehensive safety, environmental, and health program for U.S. activities in Antarctica; arranging cooperative scientific and logistics programs with other Antarctic Treaty nations; designating a senior U.S. representative in Antarctica and ensuring on-site management of field programs in Antarctica; and serving as a clearinghouse and source of information regarding Antarctic records, files, documents, and maps maintained within agencies and nongovernmental organizations.

=== Support contractors ===
Leidos is currently the prime contractor supporting the USAP. Leidos manages a team that includes partner companies performing specific support functions. Together, the companies comprising the support contractor are known collectively as the Antarctic Support Contract (ASC).

Antarctic Support Contract (ASC)
Contractor	Role
Leidos	ASC program management, science planning
Six Mile	Waste management
Damco	U.S. and international cargo, Punta Arenas operations
Gana-A’ Yoo (GSC)	Lodging, food/beverage, recreation, retail, post office
GHG Corporation	IT and communications
Amentum	Infrastructure, operations, transportation, and logistics
Amentum New Zealand	Christchurch operations
University of Texas Medical Branch	Medical qualification, clinic staff, and telemedicine
Parsons	Design, engineering, and construction management

=== Department of Defense ===
The DoD provides logistical support to the Program, including airlift between Christchurch, New Zealand, and McMurdo Station, continental transport aboard ski-equipped C-130s, weather forecasting, air traffic control and shipborne fuel and cargo delivery support.

=== NASA ===
NSF partners with NASA to conduct a range of scientific research in Antarctica, with the NSF-managed Antarctic Program providing the logistical support for this scientific work. It maintains a long-duration balloon facility at McMurdo Station to launch scientific payloads into the stratosphere suspended from large helium balloons. In addition, the McMurdo ground station downloads data from about a dozen polar orbiting satellites.

=== NOAA ===
NOAA maintains a facility at the South Pole that monitors the hole in the ozone layer and maintains long-term records of the relative balance of gases in the atmosphere. One of the longest and most complete record of gasses such as carbon-dioxide in the atmosphere comes from the South Pole. They also partner with the NSF for transportation to and from their penguin research facility in the South Shetland Islands.

=== Department of Homeland Security ===
The United States Coast Guard's heavy icebreaker USCGC Polar Star breaks a channel from the sea ice edge to McMurdo Station every year and escorts the annual fuel and resupply ships.

=== Department of the Interior ===
The Department of the Interior's Aviation Management Division provides procurement assistance, contract administration, and inspection for commercial aircraft providers contracted to the USAP. The U.S. Geological Survey holds geodetic data that support mapping in Antarctica and administers Antarctic place-name decisions.

=== Department of State ===
The Department of State is responsible for formulating foreign policy and providing foreign policy direction in regard to developing and implementing an integrated U.S. policy for Antarctica. This includes conducting foreign relations regarding Antarctica and adjudicating legal matters related to interpreting and implementing the Antarctic Treaty.

=== Department of Justice ===
The Department of Justice's U.S. Marshals Service became the official law enforcement entity for the South Pole through an agreement with the National Science Foundation (NSF) and the U.S. Attorney for Hawaii. In 1989, the NSF approached the marshal for the District of Hawaii to assist in setting up a legal presence in Antarctica. The NSF sent two station managers from Antarctica to Glynco for training, and the Service appointed them as special deputies. The official swearing-in took place in Hawaii, the headquarters district for the American stations at the South Pole. The two special deputies rotate duty every other year. Special Deputy U.S. Marshals greet all visitors to McMurdo Station, Antarctica, with a lecture and warns that serious crimes committed on the continent by Americans can be prosecuted in the United States.
