= Palmer Station =

United States research station in Antarctica

- Antarctic base
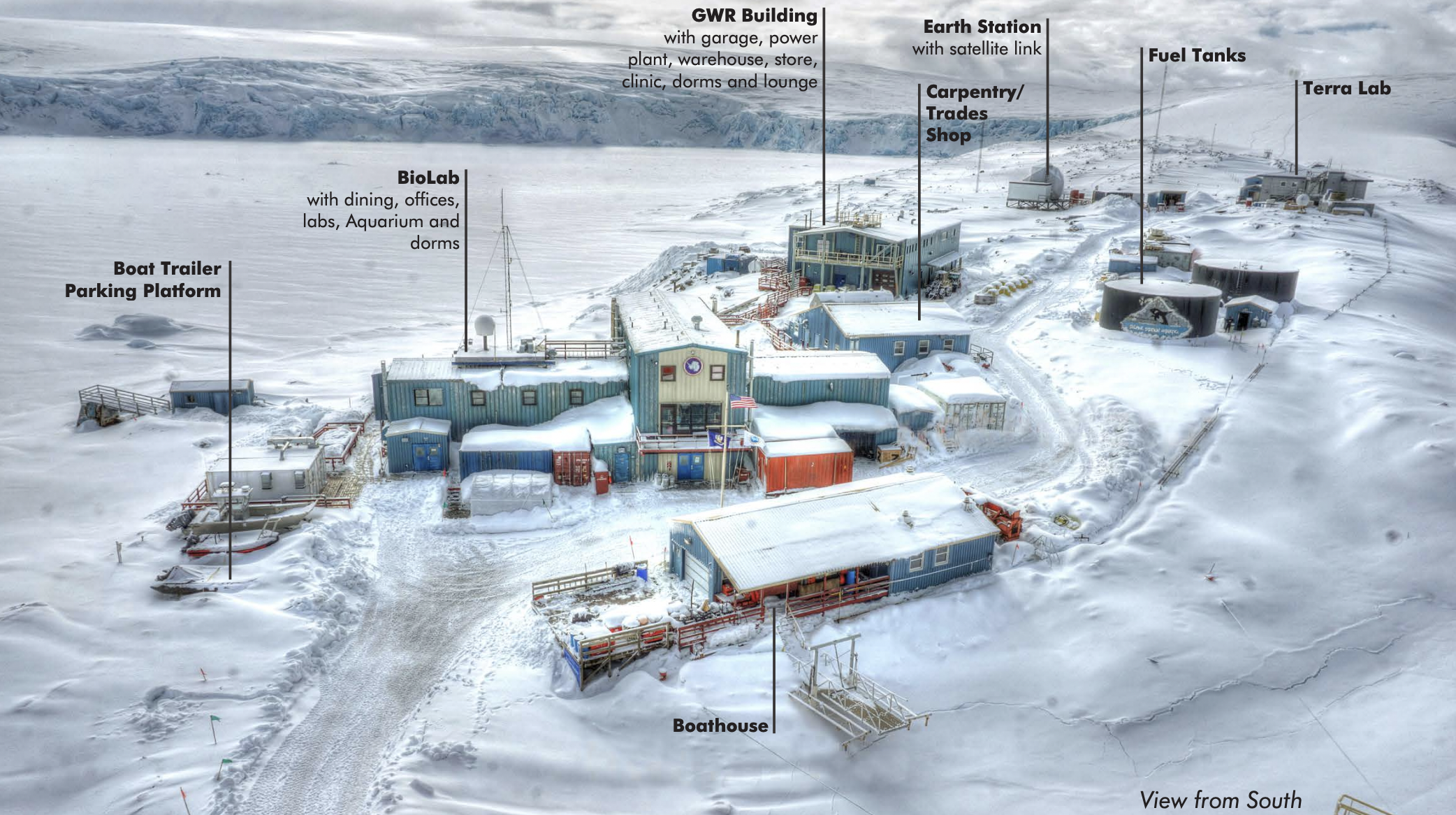
- Palmer Station, January 2016.

- Flag Logo of the USAP

- Location of Palmer Station in Antarctica
- Coordinates: 64°46′27″S 64°03′10″W
- Country: United States
- Location in Antarctica: Anvers Island; Graham Land
- Administered by: United States Antarctic Program via the National Science Foundation
- Established: 20 March 1968
- Named for: Nathaniel B. Palmer
- Elevation: 10 m (33 ft)

Population (2017)
  - Summer: 44
  - Winter: 13
- Time zone: UTC-3 (CLT)
- UN/LOCODE: AQ PLM
- Type: Year-round
- Period: Annual
- Status: Operational
- Activities: List: Marine biology; Seismology; Heliophysics
- Website: www.nsf.gov

Palmer Station is a United States research station in Antarctica located on Anvers island (aka Antwerp Island), the only U.S. station on the continent located north of the Antarctic Circle. The first Palmer was built in 1965, but the current site, near to the older one, had its initial construction of the station finished in 1968. The station, like the other U.S. Antarctic stations, is operated by the United States Antarctic Program (USAP) of the National Science Foundation. The base is much smaller than McMurdo, the largest US station, and is focused on marine and biology research such as seabirds and plankton. It also supports the RN73 site for atmospheric monitoring for radionuclides.

The base is about as distant from the equator as Fairbanks, Alaska in the northern hemisphere, whereas Palmer is in the southern hemisphere. Under the Antarctica Treaty System established in 1958, the base is neither a claim nor a forfeiture of the right to do so. There are several old claims in this region; however, they are all under abeyance under said treaty. Scientific research developed at the station is shared with treaty members, and the agreement is to use Antarctica for peaceful and scientific purposes.

In 1990 the base was designated a Long-Term Ecological Research (LTER) and there are many areas of study, such as biology, glaciers, climate, and astrophysics. Palmer consists of several buildings and fuel tanks built on a rocky outcrop of Anvers island; there is also a dock and boathouse. The main building is BioLab, which houses the main dorm, office, and labs; GWR with more dorms and a lounge, as well as storage and the powerplant; Terra Lab, the Boathouse, Earth Station, and a workshop building.

== Description ==
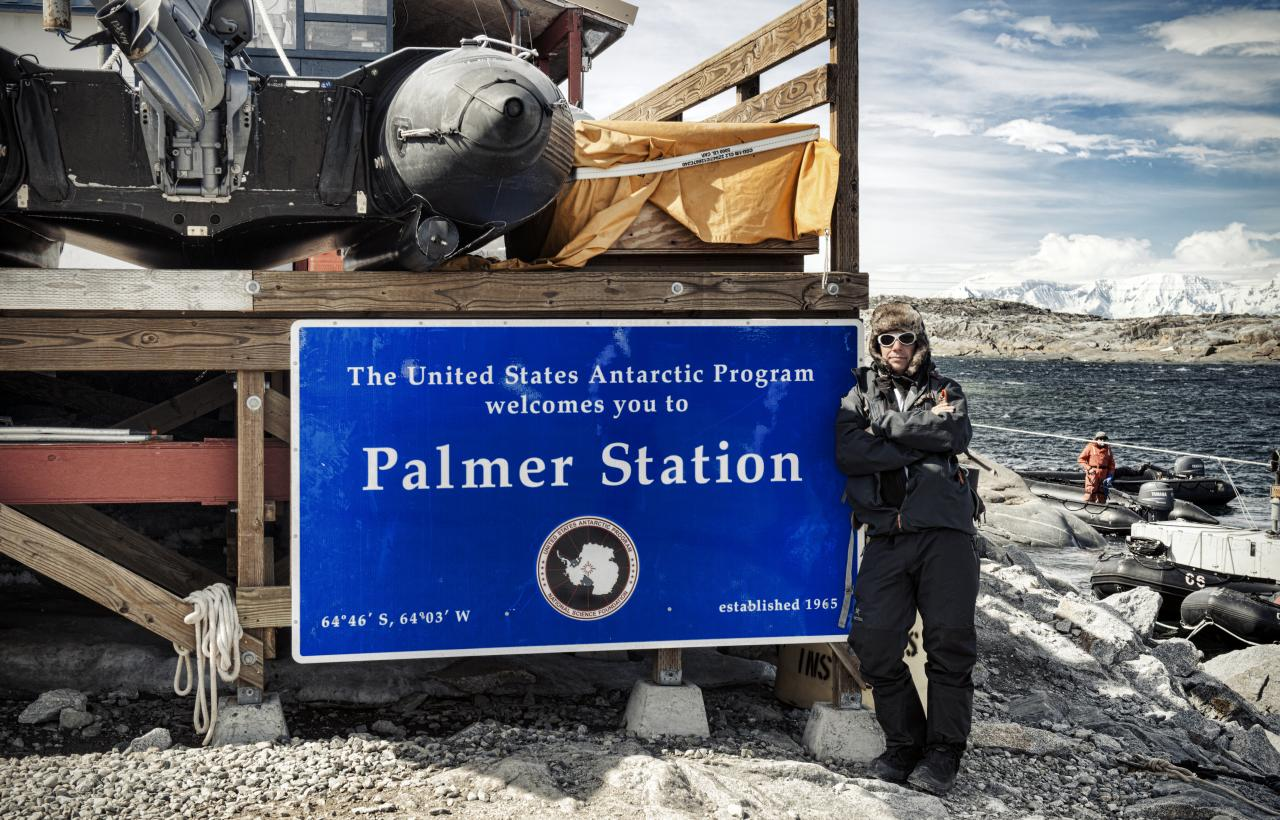
Sign for Palmer Station, 2013

The station is named for Nathaniel B. Palmer, usually recognized as the first American to see Antarctica and one of a handful of contenders for the first person to see the continent in 1820. The maximum population that Palmer Station can accommodate is 46 people. The normal austral summer contingent varies, but it is generally around 24 people. Palmer is staffed year-round; however, the population drops to around 10 people for winter maintenance after the conclusion of the summer research season. There are science labs, dorms, offices, and a cafeteria in the Bio-Lab building, and the other main building is GWR (Garage, Warehouse, and Recreation). Webcam images of the station and a penguin colony on nearby Torgersen Island are available at the station's web site. Palmer also supports the automated RN73 atmospheric monitoring site.

The facility is the second Palmer Station; "Old Palmer" was about a mile to the northwest adjacent to the site of the British Antarctic Survey "Base N", built in the mid-fifties. The site is on what is now known as Amsler Island. Old Palmer site was built about 1965 and served as a base for those building "new" Palmer, which opened in 1968. Old Palmer was designated as an emergency refuge for the new station in case of disaster, though this perceived need disappeared over time. It was dismantled and removed from the Antarctic as part of the National Science Foundation's environmental cleanup efforts in the early 1990s.

Most of the station's personnel are seasonal employees of the U.S. Antarctic Program's main support contractor, Leidos. Previous main support contractors were Raytheon Polar Services, Holmes and Narver of Orange, California, ITT Antarctic Services of Paramus, New Jersey, and Antarctic Support Associates of Englewood, Colorado. Over time many support staff have worked for two or more of these firms.

The base is a few days away from Chile by boat across the Drake Passage, and does not have an airstrip. The station is usually visited once a month during the summer season for resupply and staff changes.

== Science ==
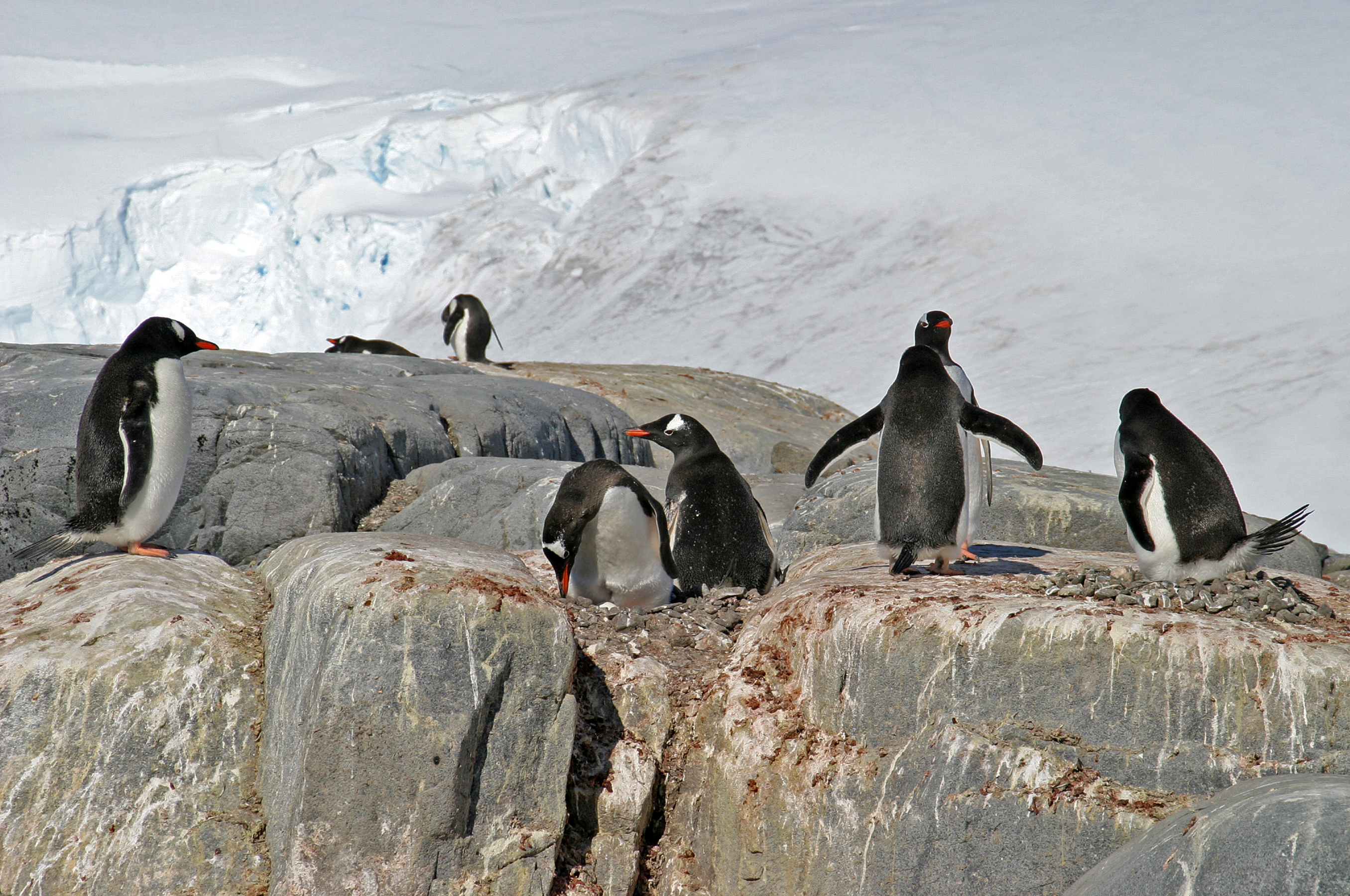
Gentoo penguins near Palmer Station

Palmer Station is located at 64.77°S, 64.05°W. The majority of the science research conducted at Palmer Station revolves around marine biology. The station also houses year-round monitoring equipment for global seismic, atmospheric, and UV-monitoring networks, as well as a site for the study of heliophysics. Palmer also hosts a radio receiver that studies lightning over the Western Hemisphere.

Other research was conducted by the RV Laurence M. Gould and continues to be conducted by the RVIB Nathaniel B. Palmer. Science cruises cover physical oceanography, marine geology, and marine biology. The ship also carries field parties to sites around the Antarctic Peninsula to study glaciology, geology, and paleontology.

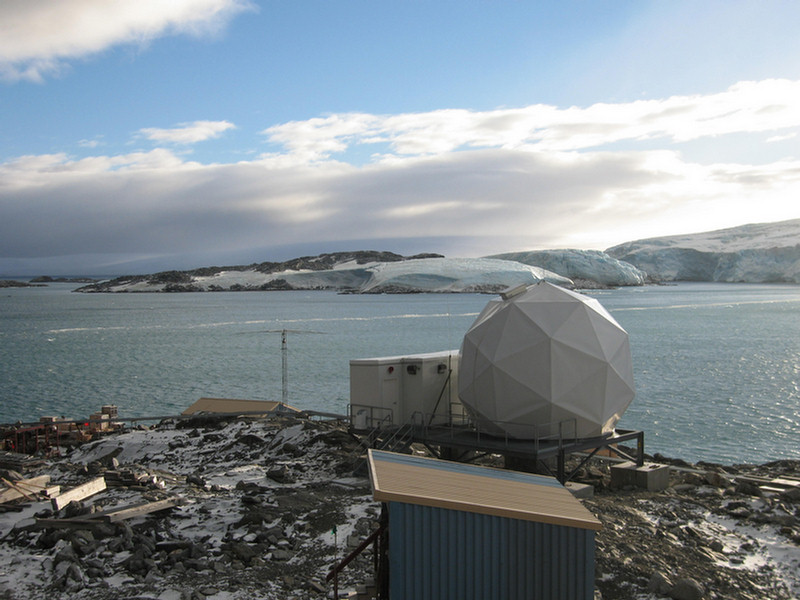
SES-14 Earth-station with Ham Triband Antenna in background

The USAP has a science planning summary for each year at Palmer Station.

In 2005, a research team from the Woods Hole Oceanographic Institution and the University of Southern Mississippi mapped the nearby ocean floor.

In 2020, when the COVID-19 pandemic began the staff noted they felt protected from the spreading virus, but some were eager to return home to help.

Zodiac boats are used to support the study of marine science at Palmer station. In 2022 a new dock was completed.

Palmer Station has been used for science education projects, and, for example, did a group video call to a high school science class to teach about the facilities' research in 2023.

Some of the areas of scientific study at Palmer Station include zooplankton, phytoplankton, microbial ecology, biochemistry, penguins, and other seabirds.

== Life and culture ==
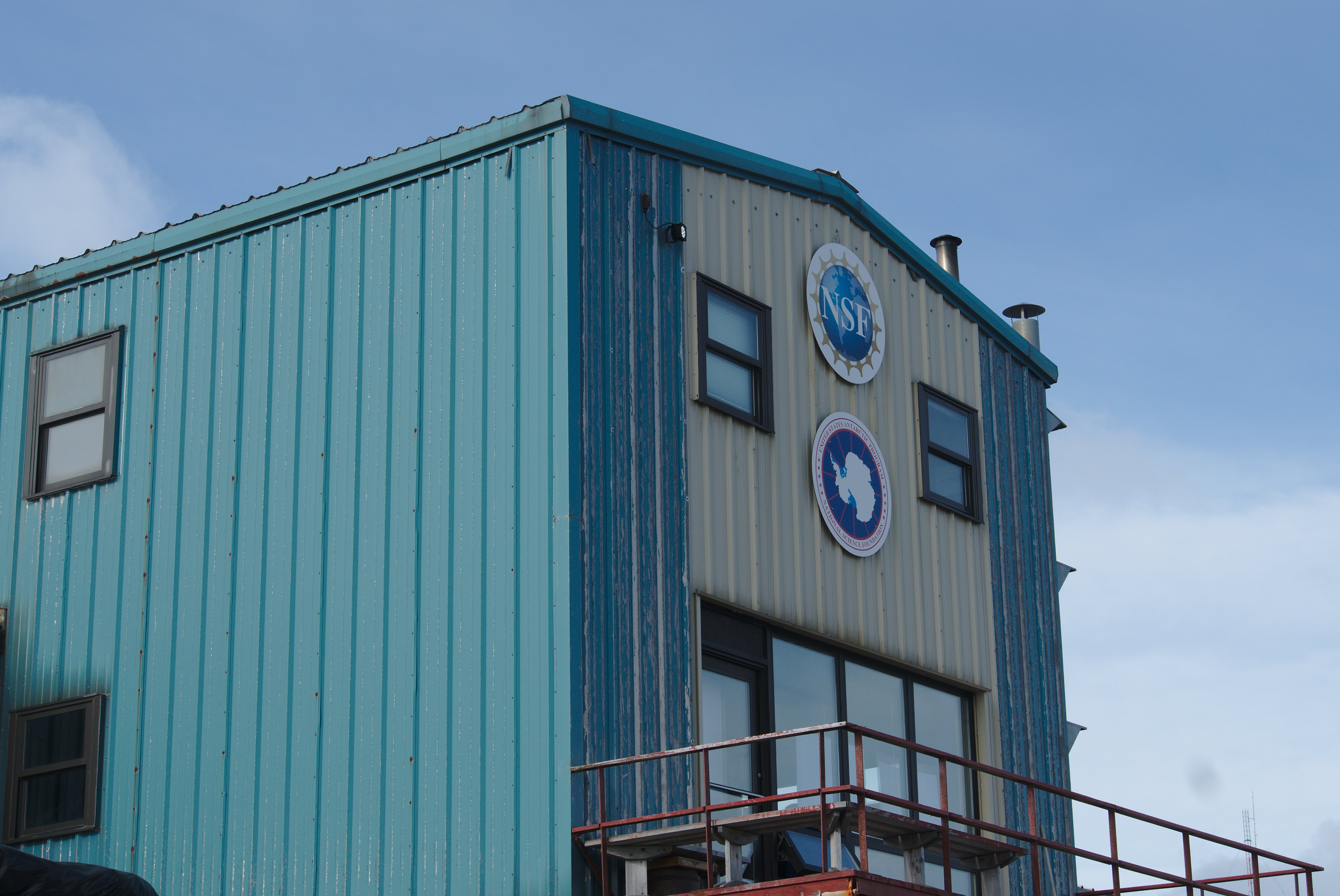
BioLab, the main building at Palmer

There are many tasks to accomplish at Palmer, but because of the smaller staff some jobs like kitchen duty are also spread out among the staff. Jobs include research, janitor, welding, carpentry, computer, lineman, and others. Although isolated from the rest of the world for months at time, the base itself is highly social and difficult for introverts, with one comparing the atmosphere at Palmer to a college dorm or summer camp. Staff usually work 9 hour days 6 days a week, and usually have more than one job. Some of the tasks including planning expeditions for research, lectures, and meetings.

Life revolves around the main BioLab buildings which has dorms and a cafeteria, as well as labs. The base has a small gym but less recreational facilities than the larger bases, but is known for its great nature views.

== Climate ==
The Köppen Climate Classification for Palmer Station is a tundra climate (ET). Due to its northern location within Antarctica and proximity to the coast, the temperatures moderate more than interior climates. Winters are generally cold and subzero, while summers are chilly, but regularly rise to temperatures above freezing. The average temperature for the year in Palmer Station is 28.8 °F (-1.8 °C). The warmest month, on average, is January. The coldest month is August.

Climate data for Palmer Station
Month	Jan	Feb	Mar	Apr	May	Jun	Jul	Aug	Sep	Oct	Nov	Dec	Year
Record high °F (°C)	58.6 (14.8)	54.8 (12.7)	51.0 (10.6)	46.7 (8.2)	45.3 (7.4)	42.1 (5.6)	38.5 (3.6)	37.9 (3.3)	39.9 (4.4)	43.7 (6.5)	49.8 (9.9)	52.3 (11.3)	58.6 (14.8)
Mean daily maximum °F (°C)	40.4 (4.7)	39.2 (4.0)	37.6 (3.1)	33.4 (0.8)	32.1 (0.1)	28.0 (−2.2)	26.3 (−3.2)	24.8 (−4.0)	28.6 (−1.9)	33.1 (0.6)	36.4 (2.4)	38.3 (3.5)	33.2 (0.7)
Daily mean °F (°C)	36.9 (2.7)	35.4 (1.9)	33.8 (1.0)	30.4 (−0.9)	28.3 (−2.1)	24.1 (−4.4)	21.1 (−6.1)	19.6 (−6.9)	22.1 (−5.5)	27.5 (−2.5)	31.6 (−0.2)	34.3 (1.3)	28.8 (−1.8)
Mean daily minimum °F (°C)	33.3 (0.7)	31.7 (−0.2)	30.0 (−1.1)	27.4 (−2.6)	24.5 (−4.2)	20.2 (−6.6)	15.8 (−9.0)	14.3 (−9.8)	15.6 (−9.1)	21.9 (−5.6)	26.7 (−2.9)	30.3 (−0.9)	24.3 (−4.3)
Record low °F (°C)	5.4 (−14.8)	4.2 (−15.4)	−3.5 (−19.7)	−11.0 (−23.9)	−23.2 (−30.7)	−31.8 (−35.4)	−41.5 (−40.8)	−33.5 (−36.4)	−28.9 (−33.8)	−10.1 (−23.4)	−6.9 (−21.6)	−1.1 (−18.4)	−41.5 (−40.8)
Average precipitation inches (mm)	2.16 (55)	2.26 (57)	2.76 (70)	2.84 (72)	2.47 (63)	1.83 (46)	1.65 (42)	1.82 (46)	2.09 (53)	2.58 (66)	1.89 (48)	1.55 (39)	25.90 (658)
Average relative humidity (%)	80.0	81.8	82.3	79.9	82.4	81.4	84.3	83.9	84.6	82.2	78.9	79.3	81.7

== Supply and transport ==
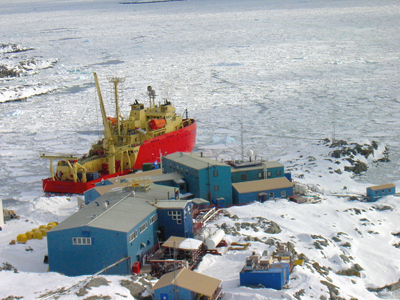
The Lawrence M. Gould at Palmer Station dock

Palmer Skiway
- IATA: none; ICAO: NZ0B

Summary
- Airport type: Private
- Owner: National Science Foundation
- Operator: National Science Foundation
- Serves: Palmer Station
- Location: Anvers Island, Antarctica
- Elevation AMSL: 149 ft (45 m)
- Coordinates: 64°46′30″S 64°03′16″W

Map
- Location of airfield in Antarctica

Runways
Direction	Length		Surface
Direction	ft	m	Surface
01/19	2,500	762	Ice
- landing for ski equipped aircraft only

Palmer Station was re-supplied by the R/V Laurence M. Gould, a ship with an ice-strengthened hull that made routine science research cruises around the peninsula. The R/V Nathaniel B. Palmer, the United States Antarctic Program's other research vessel, has also made port calls to Palmer Station — Hero Inlet, where the pier is located, was previously too shallow for the Palmer to dock at the station, though after a pier improvement/replacement finished in 2022 docking is now done routinely. Both ships were staffed and leased to the USAP by Edison Chouest Offshore. They have since been decommissioned due to budget cuts under the Trump administration.

Hero Inlet is named for the R/V Hero, a 125-foot wooden trawler-type vessel built to conduct research and supply Palmer Station from ports in Argentina and Chile. The Hero was owned by the National Science Foundation and built in 1968 by the Harvey Gamage shipyard in Maine. Palmer Station is located on Gamage Point, named for the shipbuilder. Other people believe that Hero Inlet is named after Capt. Nathaniel Palmer's 47 foot sloop, Hero, that he was sailing when he first sighted Antarctica.

After years of service, the Hero was retired in 1984 and replaced by the R/V Polar Duke, a larger and more modern ice-strengthened vessel under charter from Rieber Shipping, based in Bergen, Norway. The Duke was replaced by the R/V Laurence M. Gould in 1997.

There is no routine air access to Palmer. Over the years, small ski-equipped aircraft have occasionally landed on the glacier to the east of the station.

USAP participants traveled aboard the Laurence M. Gould from Punta Arenas, Chile. The course followed the Straits of Magellan to the east, then south along the coast of Argentina, past Cape Horn, then directly south across the Drake Passage and on to Anvers Island. The entire journey usually took four days; however, sea ice and storms could slow the journey down.

== In popular culture ==
The 1980 Japanese film Fukkatsu no Hi (Day of Resurrection/Virus) revolves around Palmer Station as the gathering place for humanity's last survivors of a deadly virus. The film stars George Kennedy as Admiral Conway, the station's commanding officer and features Glenn Ford as the President of the United States. Much of the footage for the film was shot in the vicinity of Palmer Station, though none was actually filmed at the station. Although the actual station can accommodate fewer than 50 people, the station depicted in the film housed several hundred.

== Gallery ==
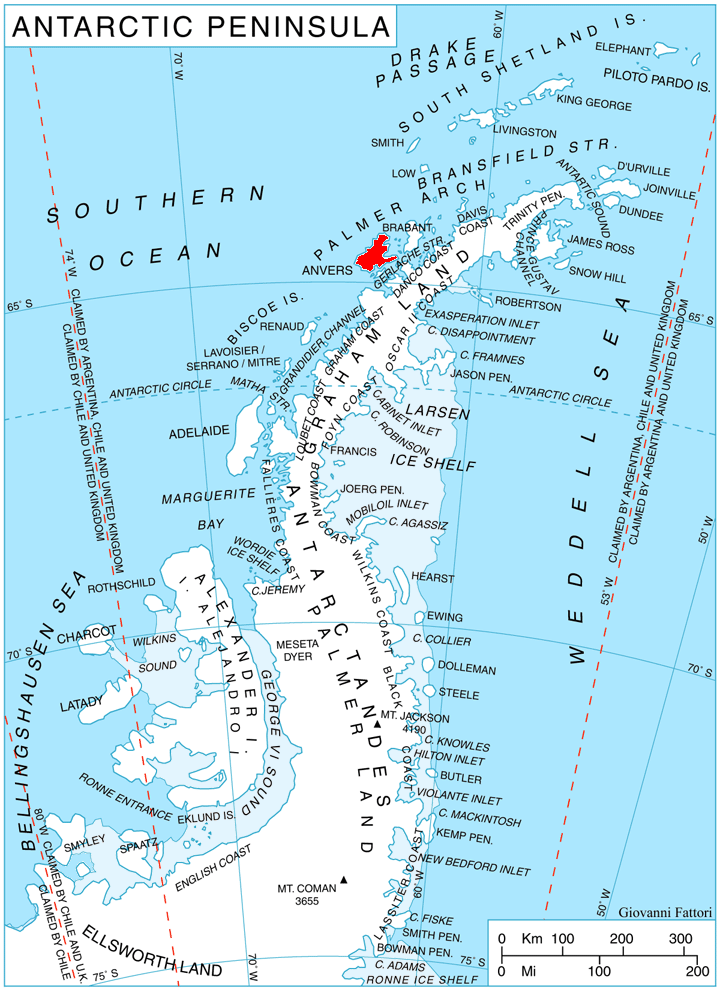
Location on Anvers Island.

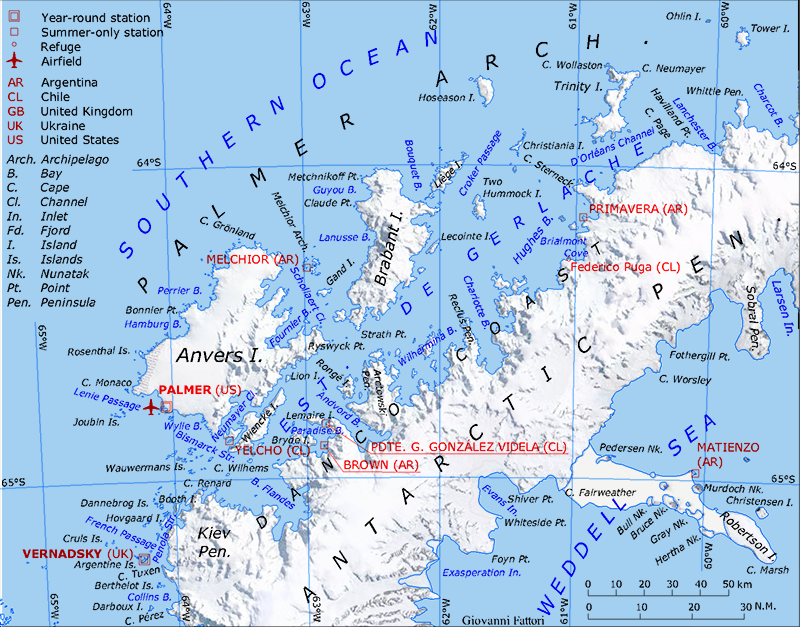
Map of Palmer Archipelago region, Cartographic base: Antarctic Digital Database.

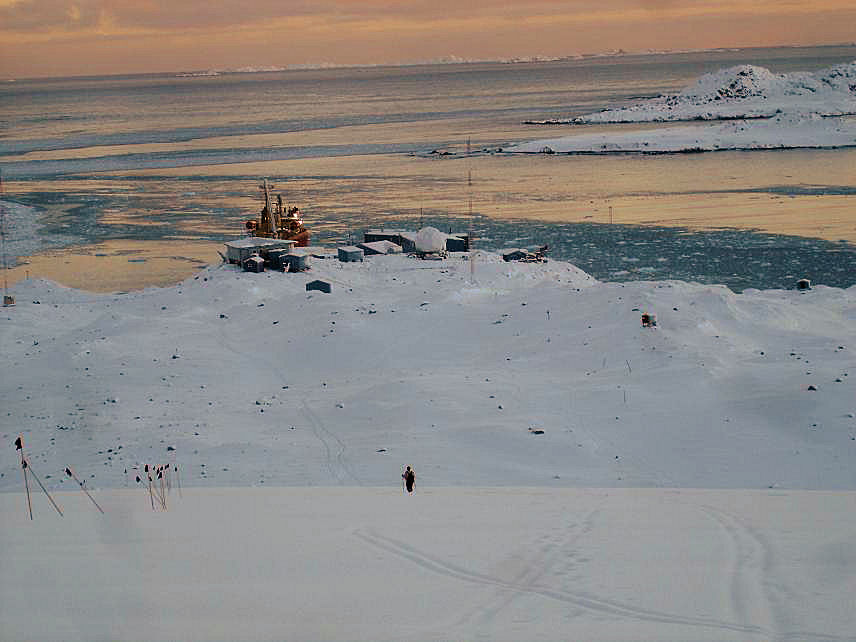
Palmer Station.

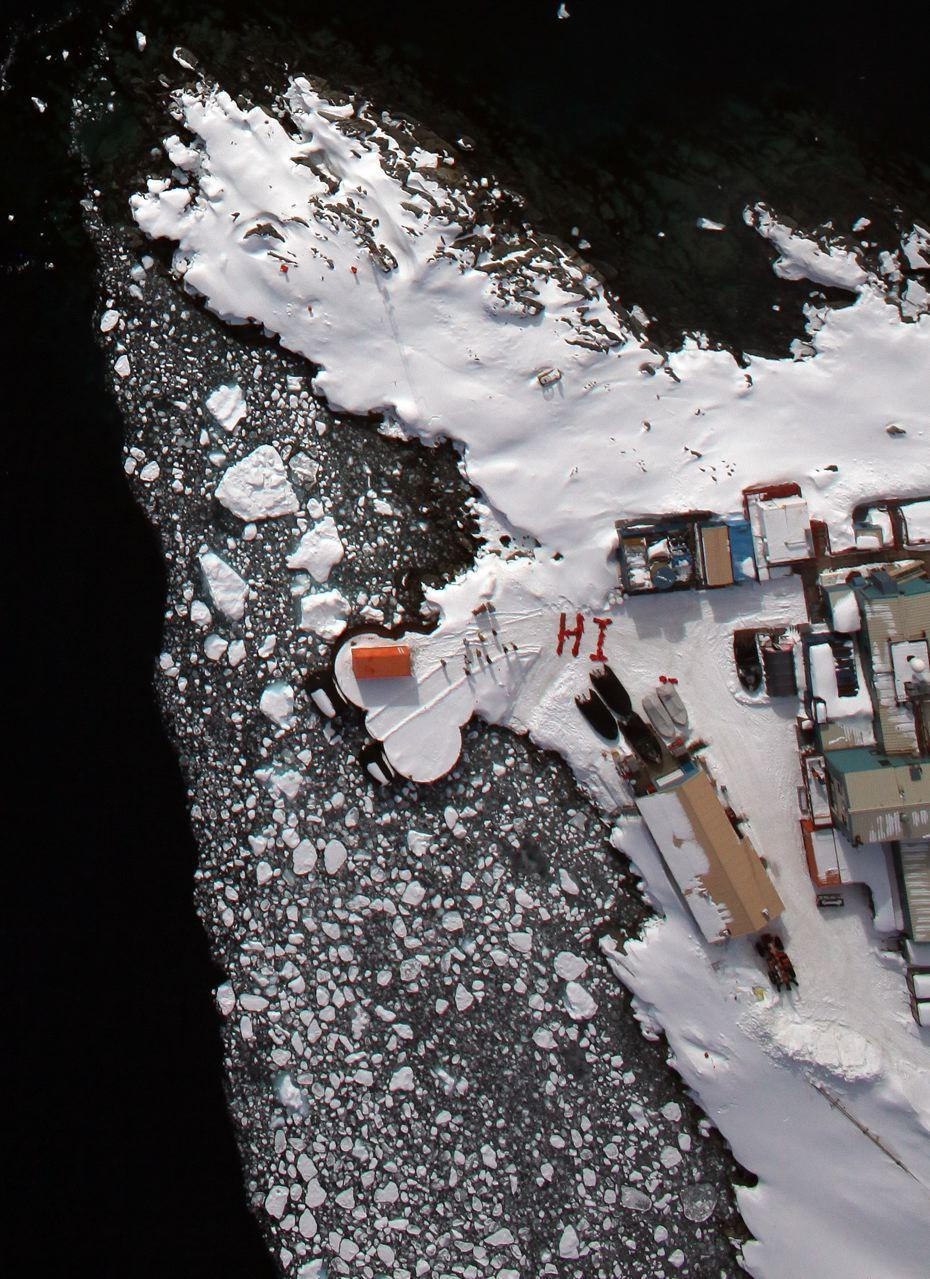
Residents use their red parkas to send a greeting to NASA's DC-8.

== See also ==
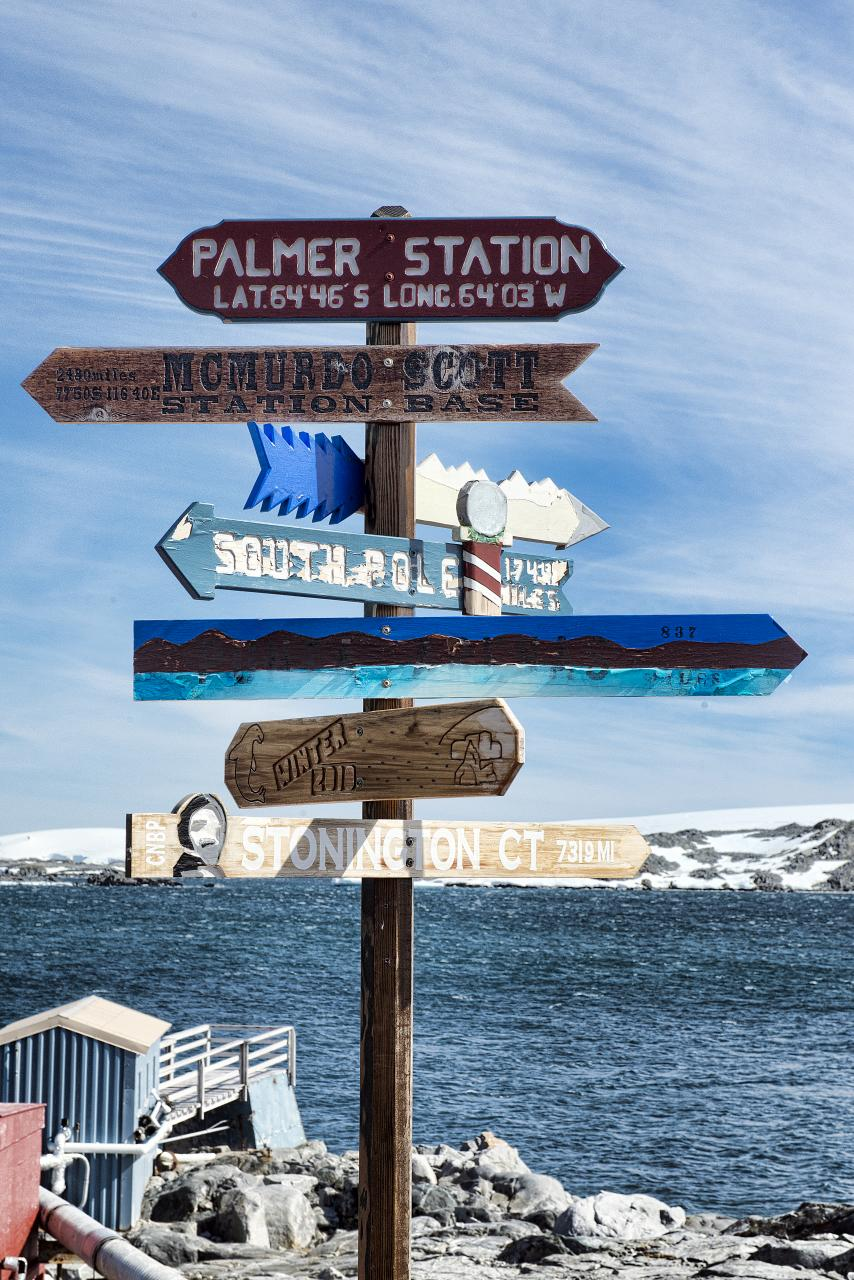
Palmer Station's fingerpost

- List of Antarctic research stations
- List of Antarctic field camps
- List of airports in Antarctica
- McMurdo Station
- South Pole Station
- Byrd Station
- Operation Deep Freeze
- Siple Station
- Ellsworth Station
- Brockton Station
- Eights Station
- Plateau Station
- Hallett Station
- Little America V
