= Kara David =

Filipino journalist and television host (born 1973)

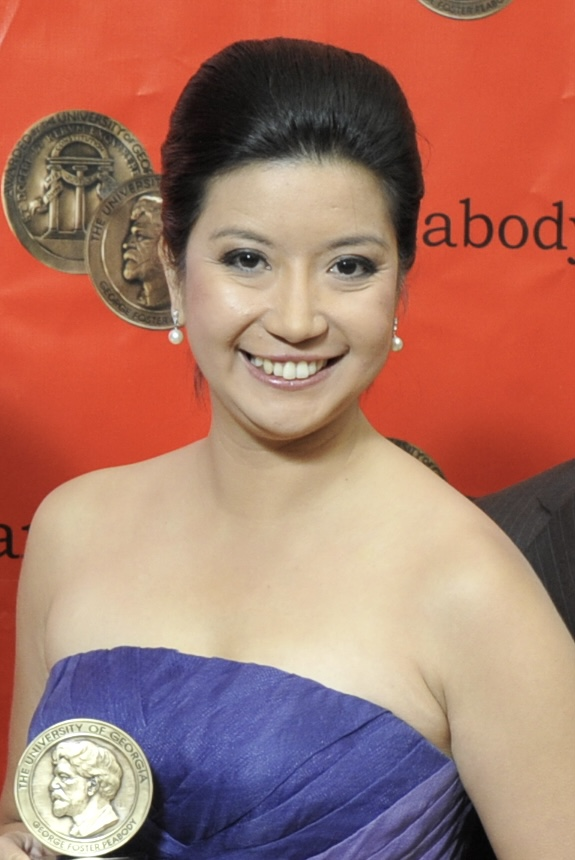
- David in 2010
- Born: Kara Patria Constantino David; September 12, 1973 (age 52); Guagua, Pampanga, Philippines
- Education: University of the Philippines, Diliman, (BA, MA)
- Occupations: Broadcast journalist Television host
- Years active: 1997–present
- Notable credits: i-Witness (2001–present); News to Go (2011–2019); Power House (2013–2016); Pinas Sarap (2017–present); Brigada (2019–2024)
- Spouse: LM Cancio (m. 2018)
- Children: 1
- Parents: Randy David (father); Karina Constantino David (mother)
- Relatives: Jovita Fuentes (great-grandaunt); Renato Constantino (grandfather); Pablo Virgilio David (uncle); Karmina Constantino (cousin)
- Awards: Peabody Award
- Website: Official website

Kara Patria Constantino David-Cancio (Tagalog: [ˈkaɾa daˈbid ˈkanʃo]; born September 12, 1973) is a Filipino journalist, host, professor, and educational administrator. She is known because of investigative and multi-awarded documentaries in i-Witness. These documentaries are "Bitay", "Selda Inosente", "Buto't Balat", and “Ambulansiyang de Paa”.

She is the previous anchor of News to Go as well as a host and writer for i-Witness at GMA Network. She is currently the host of Pinas Sarap and also previously hosted the GMA News TV shows Power House (later known as Dream Home) and Brigada. In addition, she is a professor at the University of the Philippines Diliman. She has a TikTok account and YouTube channel to share her knowledge in Journalism and other things.

She is the founder and president of Project Malasakit, a foundation that helps the people she has featured in her documentaries.

David was the only woman named in 2007's Ten Outstanding Young Men (TOYM) award. In 2010, she was awarded the Outstanding Women in the Nation's Service (TOWNS award). David won the Peabody Award, the second Filipino to win this award.

== Biography ==
Kara Patria Constantino David was born on September 12, 1973. She is the second child of professor emeritus Randy David of the University of the Philippines Diliman, and former Chairperson of the Civil Service Commission, Karina Constantino-David.

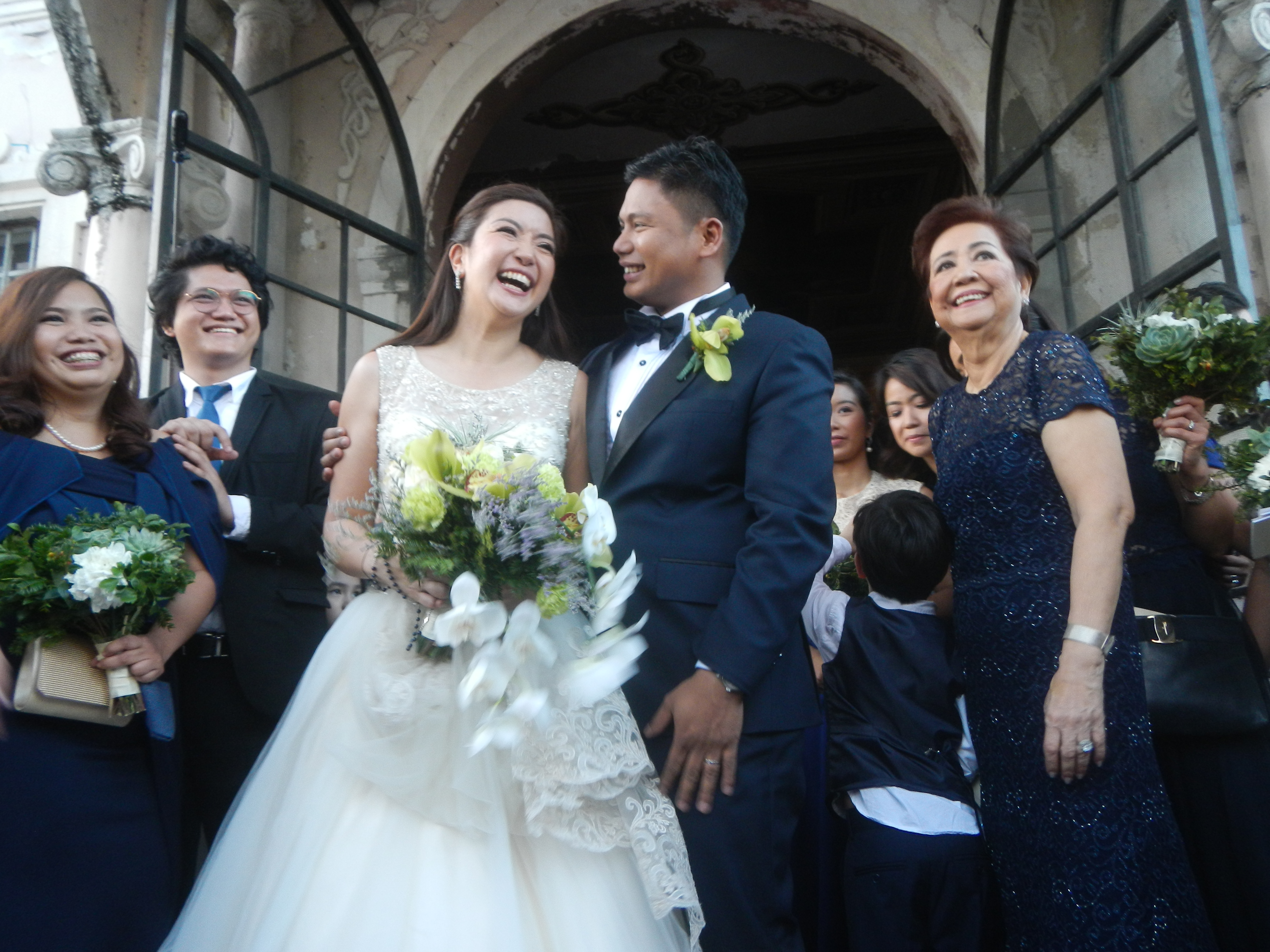
David-LM Cancio wedding, Betis Church

She graduated cum laude from the University of the Philippines Diliman with the degree of Bachelor of Arts in Broadcast Communication. She then worked as a production assistant and researcher for GMA Network in 1995. She was promoted as writer/researcher for the program “Emergency” and hosted “Huling Hirit”, a regular two-minute segment in the daily news doing adventure-oriented and inspiring features.

David also hosted several public affairs programs such as Case Unclosed, a documentary program that investigates unsolved cases and mysteries. She hosted OFW Diaries, a public service program that reaches out to Filipino overseas workers. She is the news anchor of News to Go, a former morning news program on GMA News TV. She hosted of the informative show Pinas Sarap.

In January 2018, David and singer-songwriter LM Cancio were married at Betis Church by her uncle Bishop (now Cardinal) Pablo Virgilio David with her father Randy David and Karina Constantino David.

She replaced Jessica Soho as the host of Brigada on June 11, 2019.

On June 30, 2022, it was announced that David will be heading the Department of Journalism of the University of the Philippines Diliman College of Mass Communication as its chairperson.

== Documentary films ==
David has almost a hundred documentaries to her name. In “Bitay” she helped stop the execution of a convict on death row. For this, she was honored as Investigative Journalist of the Year by the Rotary Club of Manila. In the documentary “Selda Inosente”, David entered the world of children born and raised in prison. The film won her the UNICEF Child Rights Award, besting more than a hundred entries from all over the world.

In Buto’t Balat, she explored the state of malnutrition in the country and the reality that extreme inequalities and the absence of concrete and cohesive nutrition and population policy have resulted in a state not far from what occurs in Africa. For this documentary, she was chosen as one of twenty finalists for the Japan Prize. She won a silver medal at the US International Film & Video Festival.

Ambulansiyang de Paa is about the lack of access to health services of the Mangyan tribe, who live in Mindoro Oriental. David documented the plight of the Mangyans, who have to carry their sick in hammocks for eight hours just to get to the nearest hospital. This documentary won the Peabody Award. David is the second Filipino to win this recognition.

In 2007, David was chosen as one of the Outstanding Young Men (TOYM) of the country and was honored as Broadcast Journalist of the Year. In 2011, she was chosen as one of the Ten Outstanding Women in the Nation's Service (TOWNS).

== Project Malasakit ==
Project Malasakit
- Type: Non-stock; Non-profit
- Industry: Philanthropy
- Founded: 2002
- Founder: Kara David
- Headquarters: Quezon City, Philippines
- Area served: Philippines
- Website: projectmalasakit.org

In 2002, David founded Project Malasakit – a non-stock non-profit foundation that sends poor Filipino children to school.

It embarks on community outreach programs that give food, medicine, and school supplies to remote communities that do not have access to basic government service. Project Malasakit now has 25 scholars (most of them child laborers and victims of child abuse). It has helped more than 800 families through its quarterly outreach programs. David has also embarked on long-term projects for communities.

Paraisong Uhaw, her documentary on waterless communities in Masbate, has led to the construction of 10 water wells in the municipality of Balud. David and her Project Malasakit team also constructed a sustainable solar power facility in a community of Mangyans in Mindoro Province

== Accolades ==
=== International awards ===
Year	Award
2003	UNICEF Child Rights Award for the documentary: Selda Inosente
2005	Certificate for Creative Excellence, US International Film & Video Festival for the documentary: Pagbabalik sa Selda
2005	Finalist, Japan International Prize
2005	Best Social Awareness Program, Asian Television Awards for the documentary: Buto’t Balat
2006	Silverscreen Award, US International Film & Video Festival for the documentary: Buto’t Balat
2007	Finalist, New York Film Festival for the documentary: Uuwi na si Udong
2007	Silverscreen Award, US International Film and Video Festival for the documentary: Sa Mata ni Ekang
2007	Finalist, New York Festivals for the documentary: Alaga
2007	Certificate for Creative Excellence, US International Film & Video Festival for the documentary: Gapos
2008	Finalist, New York Festivals for the documentary: Bundok na Kristal
2009	Certificate for Creative Excellence, US Int’l Film and Video Festival for the documentary Tasaday
2010	George Foster Peabody Award for the documentary: Ambulansyang de Paa
2011	New York Festivals Bronze Medal for the documentary: Paraisong Uhaw
2012	Finalist, New York Film Festival for the documentary Gintong Putik
2013	Nominated, International Emmy Awards: Alkansiya

=== Local awards ===
Year	Award
2002	Finalist, Catholic Mass Media Awards (CMMA) for the documentary: Gamugamo sa Dilim
2004	Best Television Feature, La Sallian Scholarum Award for the documentary: Gamugamo sa Dilim
2004	Investigative Journalist of the Year Rotary Club of Manila Journalism Awards
2006	Broadcast Journalist of the Year Rotary Club of Manila Journalism Awards
2007	Best Television Feature, La Sallian Scholarum Awards for the documentary: Mga Batang Hiram
2007	Best Documentary Program Host, PMPC Star Awards for Television
2007	Ten Outstanding Young Men (TOYM) of the Philippines
2008	Most Outstanding Alumnus, UP College of Mass Communication
2008	Best Documentary Program Host, PMPC Star Awards for Television
2009	Best Documentary Program, USTV Awards
2009	Best Public Affairs Program, MTRCB awards
2009	Best Documentary Program Host, PMPC Star Awards for Television
2010	The Outstanding Women in Nation Service (TOWNS) Award
2011	Titus Brandsma Leadership in Journalism Award
2011	Best Documentary Program Host, Golden Screen Awards
2011	Best Documentary Program Host, PMPC Star Awards for Television
2012	Best Female Field Reporter of the Year, Comguild Awards
2013	Best Female Field Reporter of the Year, Comguild Awards
2013	Recipient of the Rotary Golden Wheel Award
2019	Nominated, Best Educational Program, 33rd PMPC Star Awards for Television
2020	Best Documentary, Central Luzon Media Awards for the documentary: Silaki
