= Public Life with Randy David =

Philippine television public affairs show

- Genre: Late-night talk show; Public affairs
- Directed by: Marilou Diaz-Abaya
- Presented by: Randy David
- Country of origin: Philippines
- Original language: Tagalog

Production
- Running time: 60 minutes
- Production company: GMA News and Public Affairs

Original release
- Network: GMA Network
- Release: November 28, 1996 – 1998

Public Life with Randy David is a Philippine television public affairs talk show broadcast by GMA Network. Directed by Marilou Diaz-Abaya, hosted by Randy David, it premiered on November 28, 1996. The show concluded in 1998.
