= OFW Diaries =

Philippine television documentary show

- Title card
- Also known as: OFW Diaries at Mga Kwentong Pinoy Overseas
- Genre: Documentary
- Presented by: Kara David
- Country of origin: Philippines
- Original language: Tagalog
- No. of episodes: 104

Production
- Camera setup: Multiple-camera setup
- Running time: 30 minutes
- Production company: GMA News and Public Affairs

Original release
- Network: GMA Network
- Release: March 13, 2009 – January 14, 2011

OFW Diaries is a Philippine television documentary show broadcast by GMA Network. Hosted by Kara David, it premiered on March 13, 2009. The show concluded on January 14, 2011, with a total of 104 episodes.

== Ratings ==
According to AGB Nielsen Philippines' Mega Manila People/Individual television ratings, the final episode of OFW Diaries scored a 2.1% rating.
