= Randy David =

Filipino journalist and sociologist

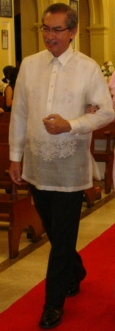
- David in 2007
- Born: Randolf Siongco David; January 8, 1946 (age 80); Guagua, Pampanga, Commonwealth of the Philippines
- Education: University of the Philippines Diliman (BA, MA)
- Occupations: Educator, TV host, columnist, journalist, sociologist
- Years active: 1986–present
- Agent(s): Intercontinental Broadcasting Corporation (1986–1992); TV5 Network (1992–1995); ABS-CBN Corporation (1995–2026); Inquirer Group of Companies (1995–present); GMA Network
- Spouse: Karina Constantino (m. 1968; died 2019)
- Children: 4, including Kara
- Relatives: Pablo Virgilio David (brother); Renato Constantino (father-in-law)

Randolf "Randy" Siongco David (born January 8, 1946) is a Filipino journalist, sociologist, and public intellectual. He is a professor emeritus of sociology at the University of the Philippines Diliman. The Philippine Daily Inquirer runs his weekly column "Public Lives" even as ABS-CBN Corporation once gave him a position of independent director of the media company until August 19, 2026.

== Early life and education ==
David was born in Guagua, Pampanga on January 8, 1946, to Pedro Sahagun David (1920-1980) and Bienvenita Sanchez Siongco (1922–2000), with 12 siblings. He obtained a Bachelor of Arts degree, major in Sociology, from the University of the Philippines Diliman in 1965. While in university, he joined the UP Alpha Sigma. He also pursued doctoral studies at the University of Manchester, though he opted not to complete them and chose instead to remain as socialist liberal in the Philippines during the martial law government of President Ferdinand Marcos.

== Career ==
A longtime professor in the Department of Sociology of the University of the Philippines Diliman, David spoke publicly about societal issues during the Marcos regime, calling for a boycott of the 1984 Batasang Pambansa election during an assembly organized by the Kongreso ng Mamamayang Pilipino (KOMPIL). David achieved further prominence in 1986, when he accepted an offer by the Intercontinental Broadcasting Corporation to host a public affairs talk show on IBC-13. The show, named Truth Forum, was notable as the only public affairs talk show during its time that was conducted in Filipino, rather than English. David later joined the newly re-established Associated Broadcasting Company (now TV5 Network) as a newscaster and the host of a new talk show, Public Life with Randy David. After leaving the network in 1995, David hosted Public Life for GMA Network, and until 2003, Off the Record (with Katrina Legarda) for ABS-CBN, his last regular hosting stint to date. Since 1995, his newspaper column, Public Lives, has appeared every Sunday on the pages of the Philippine Daily Inquirer.

On February 25, 2006, David was arrested in Santolan, Quezon City while celebrating the 20th anniversary of the first People Power Revolution. The reason for the arrest was the lack of permit to rally, President Gloria Macapagal Arroyo having revoked all permits after she declared a state of national emergency just a few hours earlier. He was later released with all charges dropped. In May 2006, the Supreme Court declared that the arrests of David and his co-detainees were invalid.

David expressed interest in running for a congressional seat in Pampanga should Gloria Macapagal Arroyo run for Congresswoman in the 2010 general elections, a fight that has been dubbed by several Senators and mediamen as "David vs. Gloriath". David later chose not to run, and Arroyo was elected to the seat in May 2010.

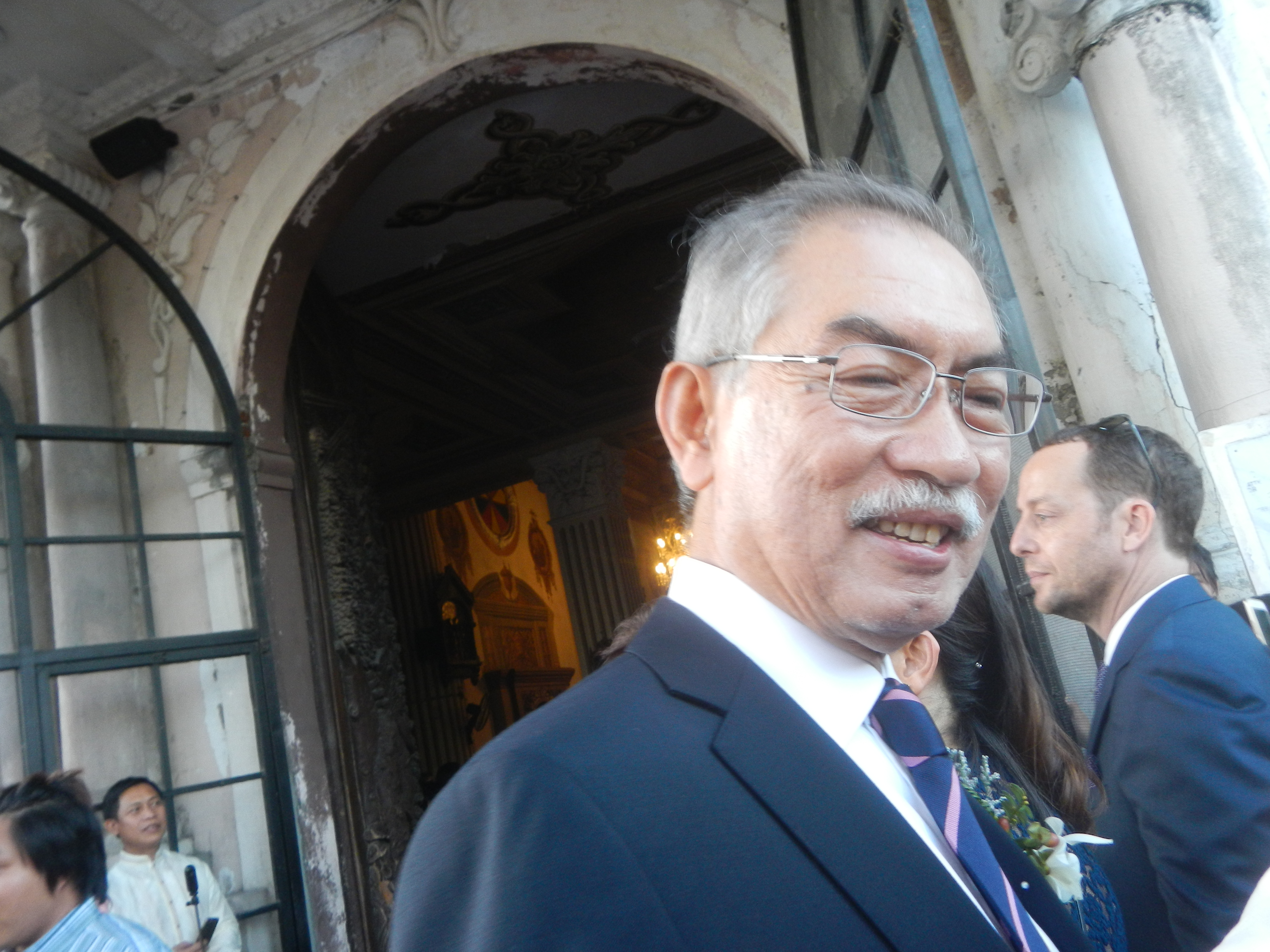
David (Betis Church)

== Personal life ==
David is married to Karina Constantino-David who served until 2008 as the Chairperson of the Civil Service Commission (CSC) of the Philippines. The couple has four children, including broadcast journalist Kara David. The Bishop of Kalookan, Pablo Virgilio Cardinal David is his younger brother. David is also the son-in-law of the historian Renato Constantino.
