= Betis Church =

Roman Catholic church in Pampanga, Philippines

- Santiago Apostol Parish Church
- Parish Church of Saint James the Apostle of Betis
- Parokya nang Santiago Apostol (Kapampangan)
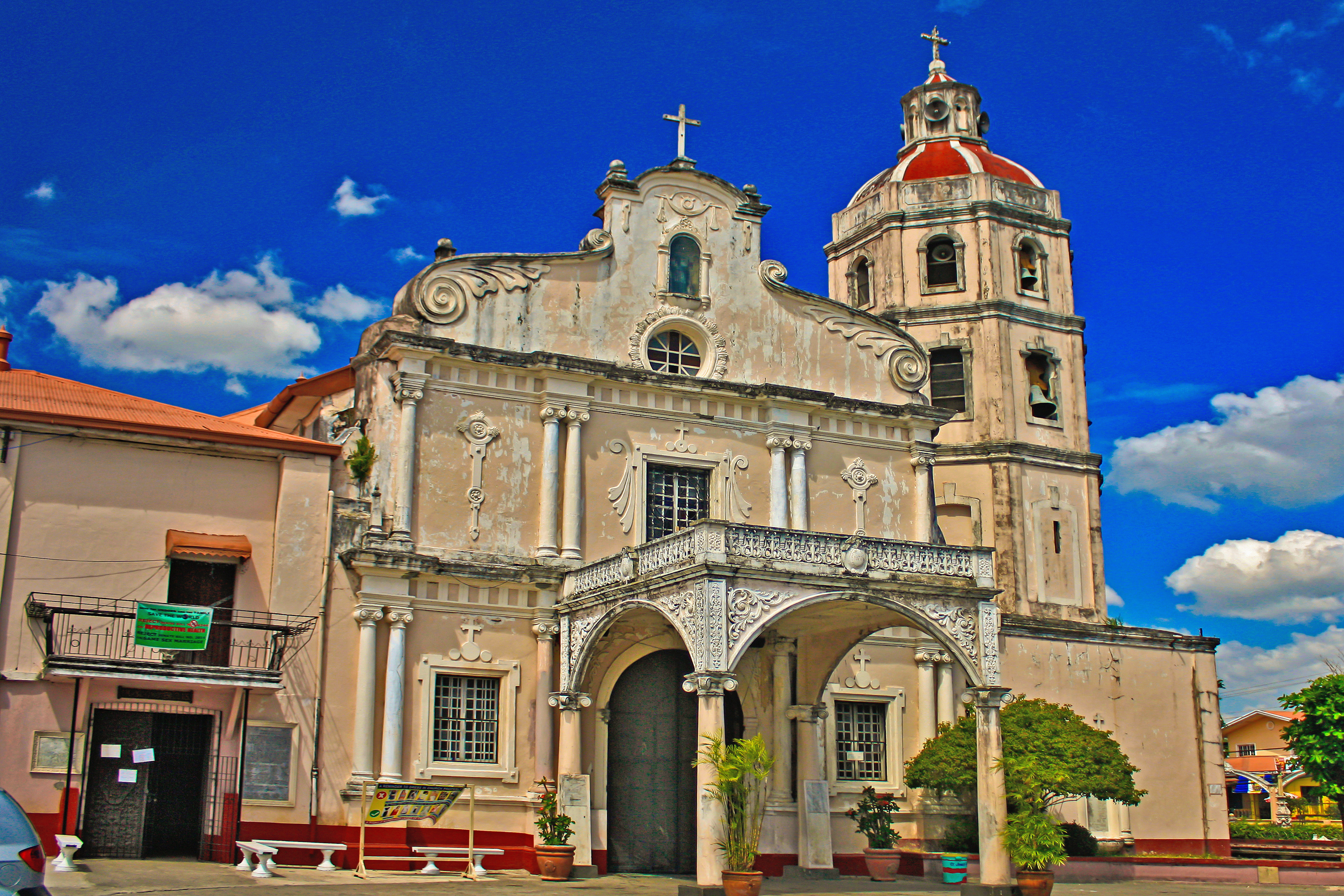
- Church façade in 2012

- Location in Luzon Location in the Philippines
- 14°58′32″N 120°38′34″E
- Location: Betis, Guagua, Pampanga
- Country: Philippines
- Denomination: Roman Catholic

History
- Status: Parish church
- Founded: 1607
- Dedication: St. James the Apostle
- Consecrated: 1770s

Architecture
- Functional status: Active
- Designated: November 5, 2001
- Architectural type: Church building
- Style: Baroque

Administration
- Province: Ecclesiastical Province of San Fernando
- Archdiocese: Roman Catholic Archdiocese of San Fernando

Clergy
- Archbishop: Most. Rev. Florentino G. Lavarias

National Cultural Treasures
- Official name: Parish Church of Saint James the Apostle of Betis
- Region: Region III

Santiago Apostol Parish Church, commonly known as Betis Church, is a Baroque-style church located in the Betis District of Guagua in Pampanga, Philippines under the Roman Catholic Archdiocese of San Fernando. The church was established in 1607 and dedicated to Saint James the Greater, the Apostle. It was declared a National Cultural Treasure by the National Museum and the National Commission for Culture and the Arts.

== History ==
The baroque-inspired Betis Church was built around 1660 under Father José de la Cruz. The initial structure was made of light materials, mainly wood and stucco. Fire broke out within the church several times due to these light materials, so it was finally rebuilt with concrete in 1770.

In the last quarter of the 19th century, Father Manuel Camañes dug an artesian well on the north side of the church, giving a source of potable water to the people of Betis and nearby towns. The present-day concrete fence with caryatids was built in the earlier half of the 20th century.

During the Spanish Period, Betis was an independent town. Due to a population shift to neighbouring Guagua during the American Period, Betis was absorbed by Guagua in 1904 under Act 943. In 1908, the rectory of the church caught fire, and all baptismal records and other historical catalogues of the church were lost. The musical industry entered Betis Church in 1912, where Band 12 still plays musical pieces until today. Later Band 46, Band 47, and Band 48 joined Band 12 in playing music every patronal feast for both Guagua and Betis to honour each church's respective patron saints.

Beautification of the interior was extensively done in 1939 by Father Santiago Blanco, the last Spanish priest of the church. The ceiling of the nave was painted by the famous Anac Baculud, a relative of Juan Crisostomo Soto, by the name of Isidoro C. Soto, who was mentored by Dr. Sijuco. Isidoro, nicknamed Doro Soto, himself painted the ceiling itself.

Although today part of the municipality of Guagua, Betis Church retains its own parish priest.

== Declaration as a National Cultural Treasure ==
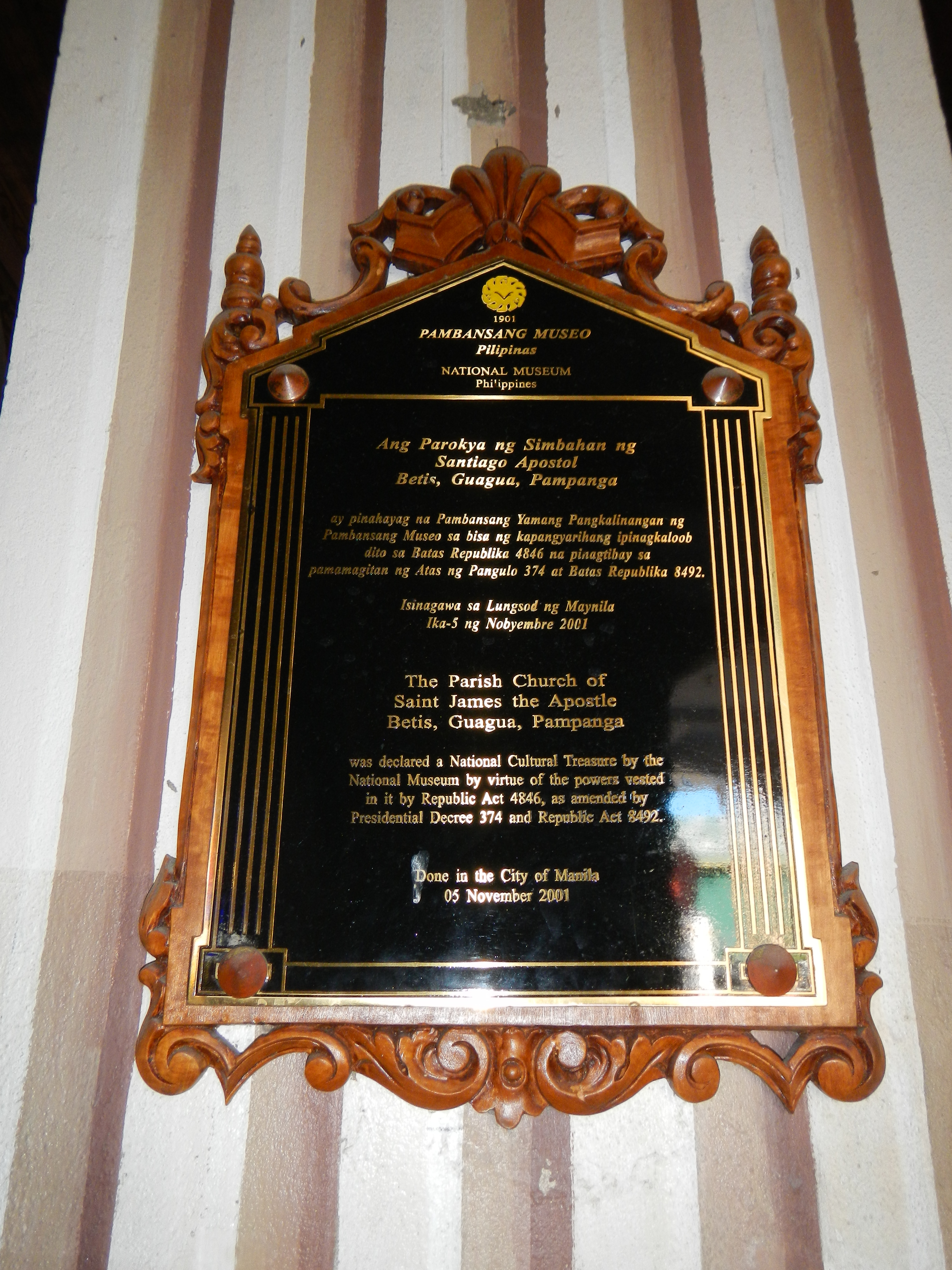
National Cultural Treasure Marker

Betis Church was declared a National Cultural Treasure by the National Museum and the National Commission for Culture and Arts under Republic Act 4896 as amended by Presidential Decree 374 and Republic Act 8492 on November 5, 2001. In 2009, the National Museum installed a marker of its 2005 Proclamation.

== Features ==
The main attraction of the church is the original ceiling mural done by the famous painter Simón Flores (1839–1904). Not to be missed are his original painting of the Holy Family, the artesian well (dug in the 1800s) in the patio – the first well in the country to be so situated, and the rare betis tree nearby donated by sociologist Randy David, a native of the town. A two-minute walk from the church is the restored David House, ancestral home of the sociologist, which they christened as Bale Pinauid or Bahay Pawid.

=== Church building ===
The unique design of Betis Church reflects the integration of Spanish and Latin American architecture to indigenous architecture, including elements of Oriental style during the Spanish colonial era. The Church's political power of that period manifests in the architecture. It had been designed to withstand attacks during revolts and rebellions, giving the church the appearance of a fortress. The blending of religion and military portrays the manner Spain saw its situation in the Philippines. The church was also designed to withstand earthquakes that occur often in the region. This unique architectural style became known as Earthquake Baroque.

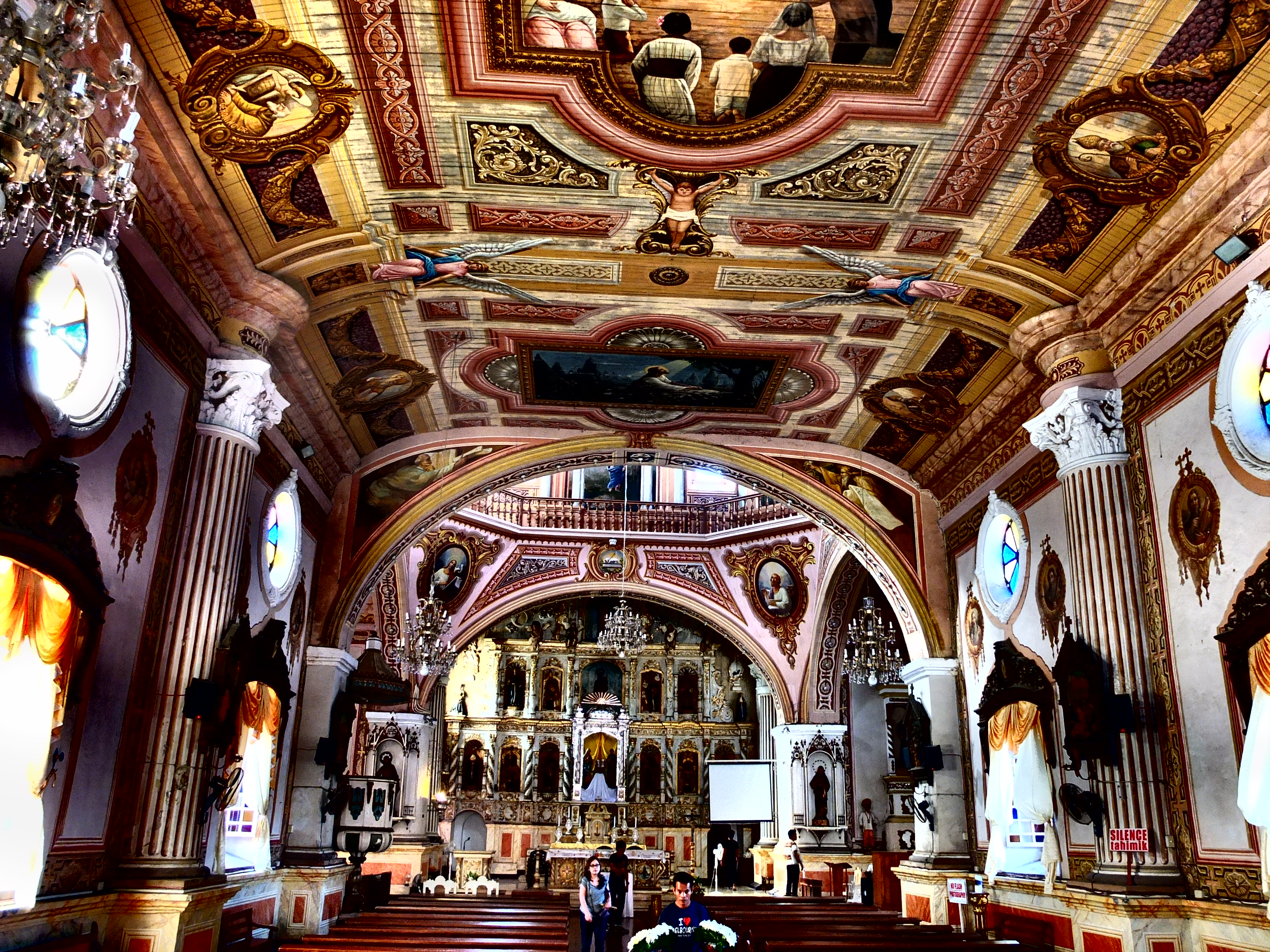
Church interior in 2015

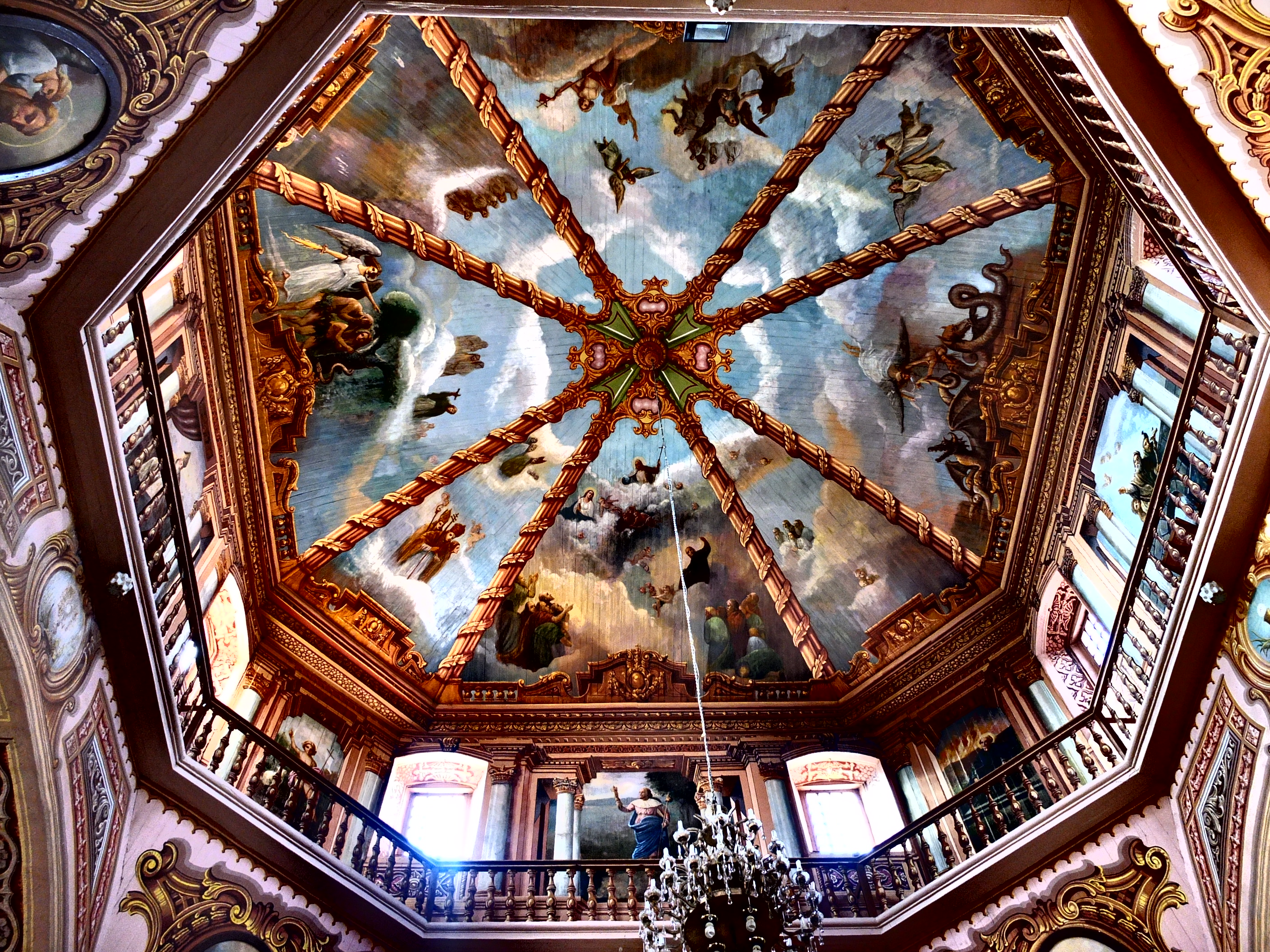
Dome

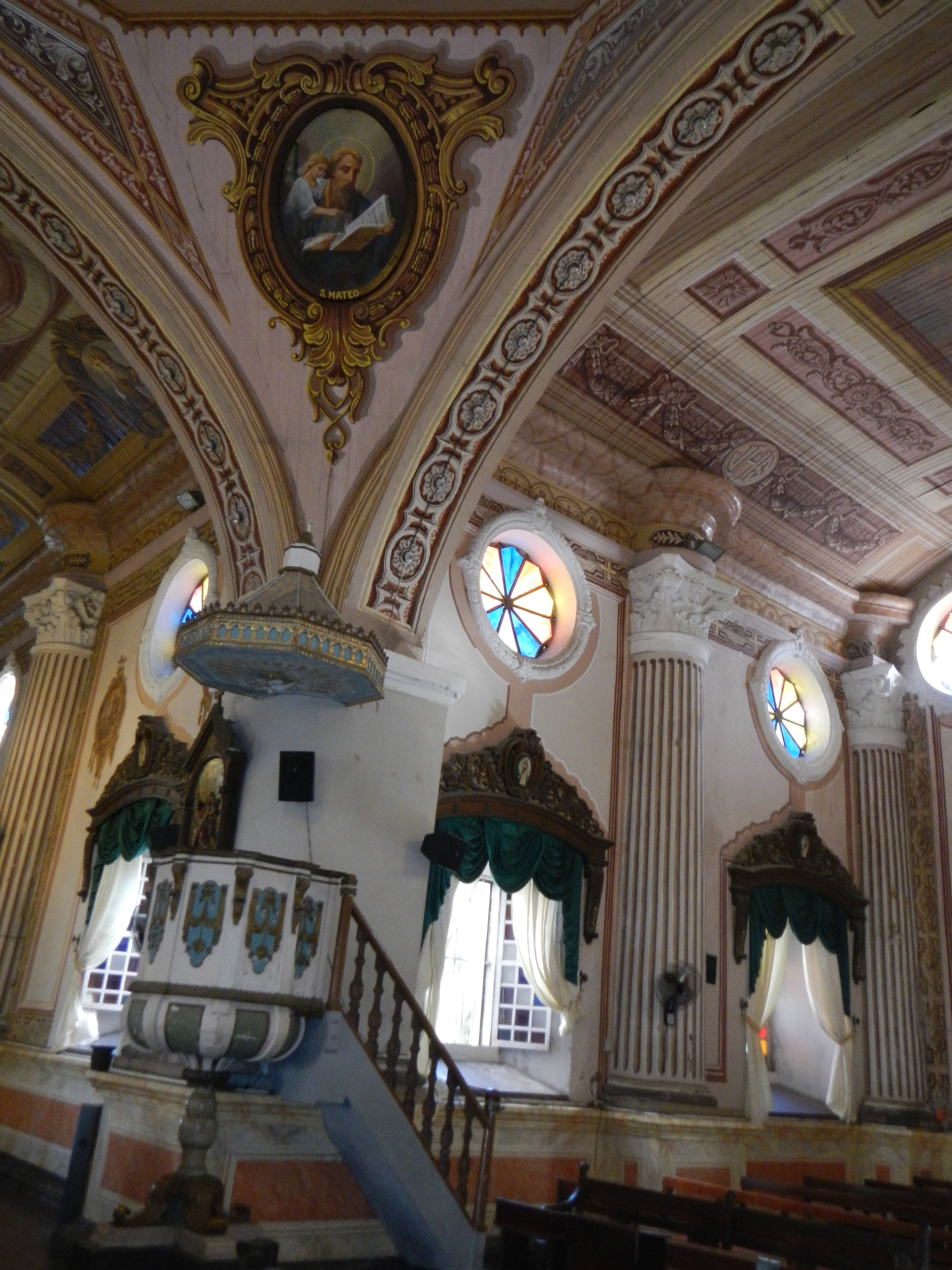
Pulpit

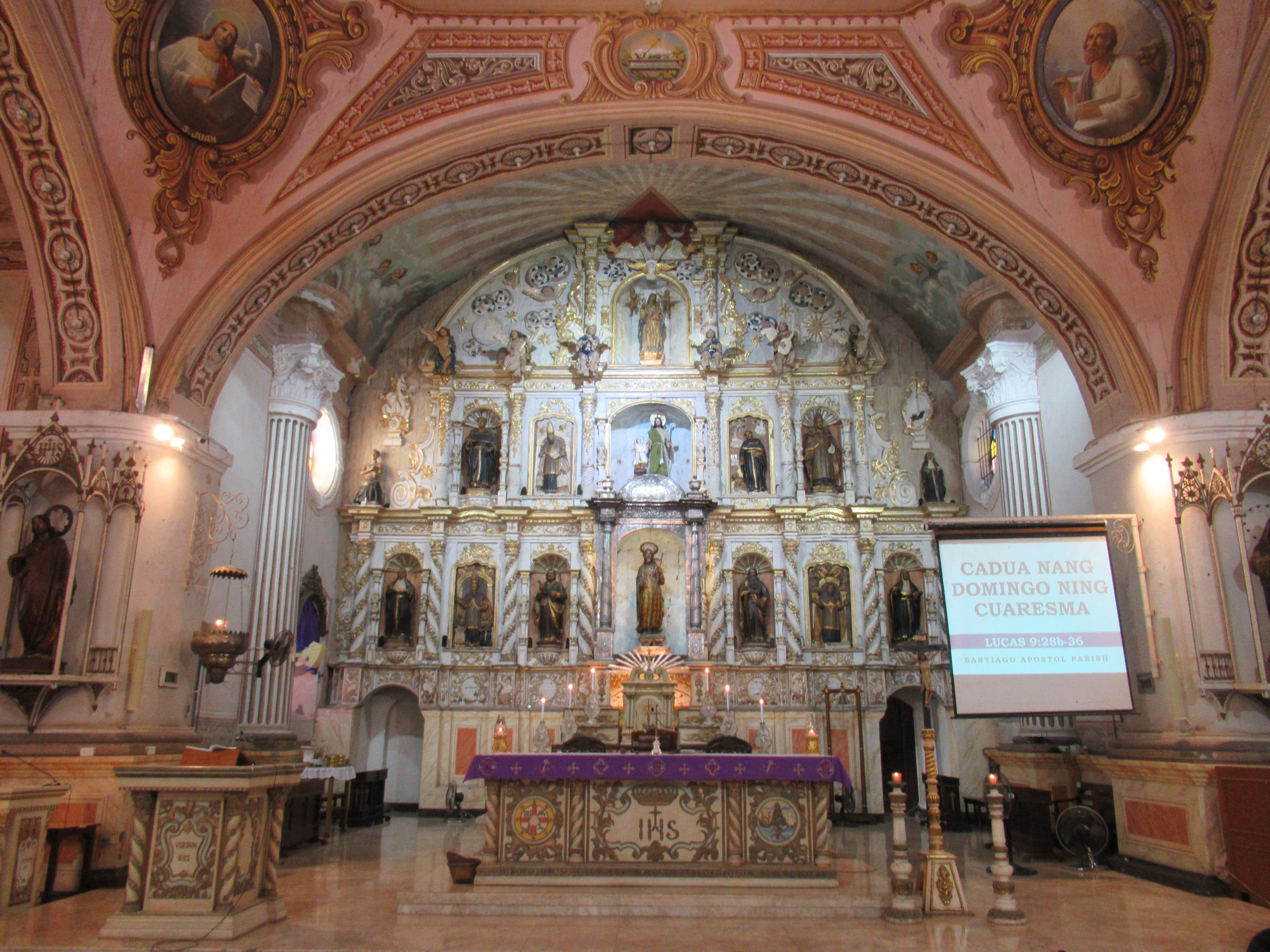
Altar

The retablo, a classic altar, is ornately decorated with carved designs. The religious frescoes in the ceiling and murals on the wall with its intricate sculpture and paintings in gold dust are reminiscent of the Renaissance age of European Art. One can behold the majesty of its ceiling, walls and the altar from the aisle near the main door. There are paintings and murals of the Holy Family, selected Biblical scenes, Catholic saints and cherubs. The church is dubbed as "the Sistine Chapel" of the Philippines.

The church was built by Augustinian priests from 1660 to 1670. The initial structure was composed of wooden materials. However, the Church was destroyed by several fires, which justified the consequent use of non-combustible concrete materials in 1770.

The artworks of the interior were extensively done in 1939 under the last Spanish friar who served as parish priest, Fr. Santiago Blanco, OSA. Native painter Macario Ligón was later commissioned to paint the ceiling of the church. Later in the 1970s, Ligón's assistant and nephew Victor Ramos restored 80 percent of the ceiling and mural paintings. The floor of the church is made of tough native wood. The main entrance to the church features some heavy details. The carvings portray the "Gates of Paradise".

A museum (Museo Ning Betis) stands on the right side of the Church which shows some vintage photos and the history of the church.

Outside, sculptures could be found including the monuments of Santiago de Galicia, St. Joseph the Carpenter and the Sacred Heart of Jesus. Also in front of the church is the Betis Artesian Well known to be the oldest deep well in the province.

Standing at the nave of the church, one can see the ceilings, walls and the retablo styled with paintings and murals of the Holy Family, selected scenes from the bible, Catholic saints and cherubs.

=== Victor Ramos and the ceiling paintings ===
Victor Ramos y Gozum (1922–1986) repainted almost 80% of the ceiling and mural paintings in the interior of the Betis church which most contemporary writers mistook for Simon Flores originals. Ramos and Daning Henson from San Fernando Pampanga and a certain Mr. Pangilinan reworked the ceiling paintings in the early 1980's, commissioned by the Betis Fiesta Committee under Tatang Emias Roque. It was a flagship project for the town which was then headed by former Guagua Mayor Atty. Manuel Santiago. Based on Macario Ligón-originals (Ligón was an uncle and teacher of Ramos in painting), repainting was done due to the decaying panels infested by termites and to avoid a more devastating effect on other parts of the church's ceiling. Photographs served as guides for the painters in the restoration process which simulated the original ones especially the trompe l'oeil (fool the eye) effect of the vaults, frames and arches. The original ones were painted in the pre-war years by Macario Ligón of Barrio San Agustín Betis which was headed by the last Spanish friar of Betis named Santiago Blanco. Ramos never had a hard time repainting the ceiling in the late 1970s to early 1980s since he was also the apprentice of Macario Ligón when the latter started painting it in 1939. He was only in his teens then.

Ramos nurtured his painting skill despite being born in an impoverished family in Betis. Working as an apprentice under his uncle Macario Ligón, he became so interested with ecclesiastical painting which became his specialization. He entered the School of Fine Arts at the University of the Philippines Diliman, and after a year, made his way to work with Maximo Vicente, a well-known sculptor, in the post-war period. He became an encarnador, one who paints the skin of rebultos, and had several side jobs along Mabini and Hidalgo Streets in Quiapo before he came back to Betis and married his longtime sweetheart Ester.

His important works include "The Genesis and Apocalypse", Betis Church Dome (1985), "The Four Evangelists", Betis Church pendentives (1985), "St. John Baptizing Christ", Betis Baptistry (1972), "The Four Evangelists", Guagua Parish Church (undated), "The Four Evangelist", San Guillermo Church of Bacolor Pampanga, "Fourteen Stations of the Cross", Obando Parish Church, Obando Bulacan (1982).

Ceiling Paintings

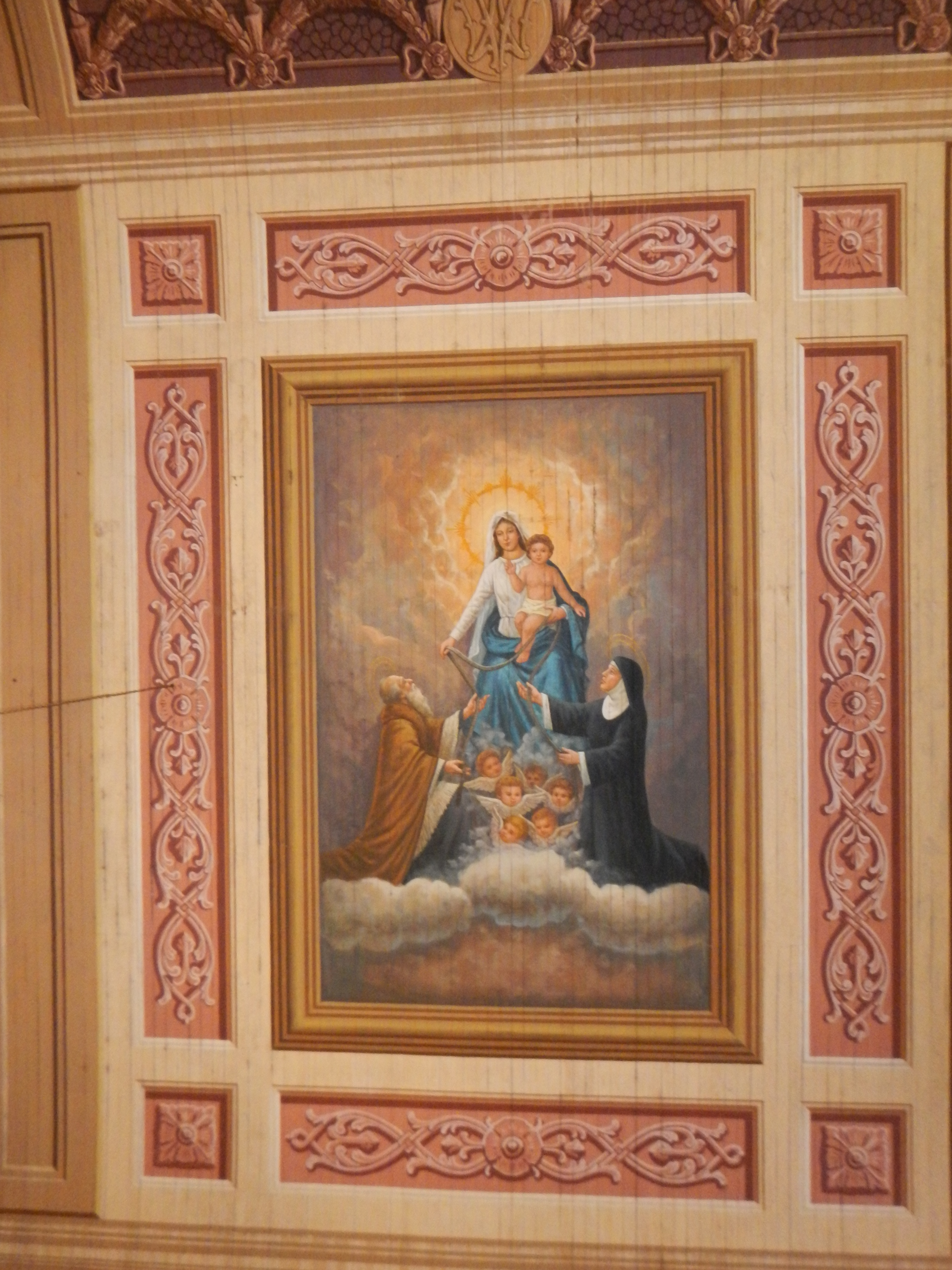

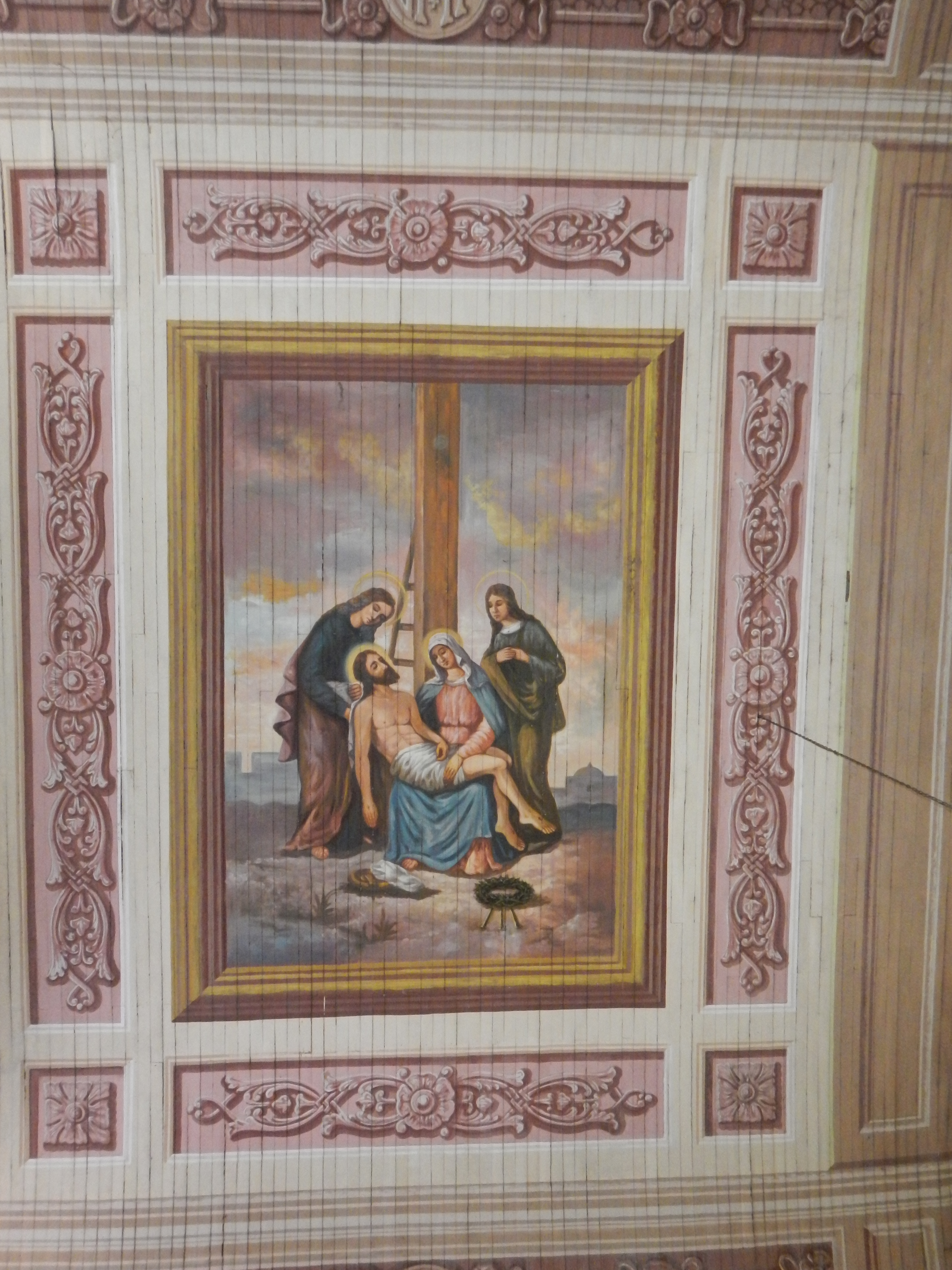

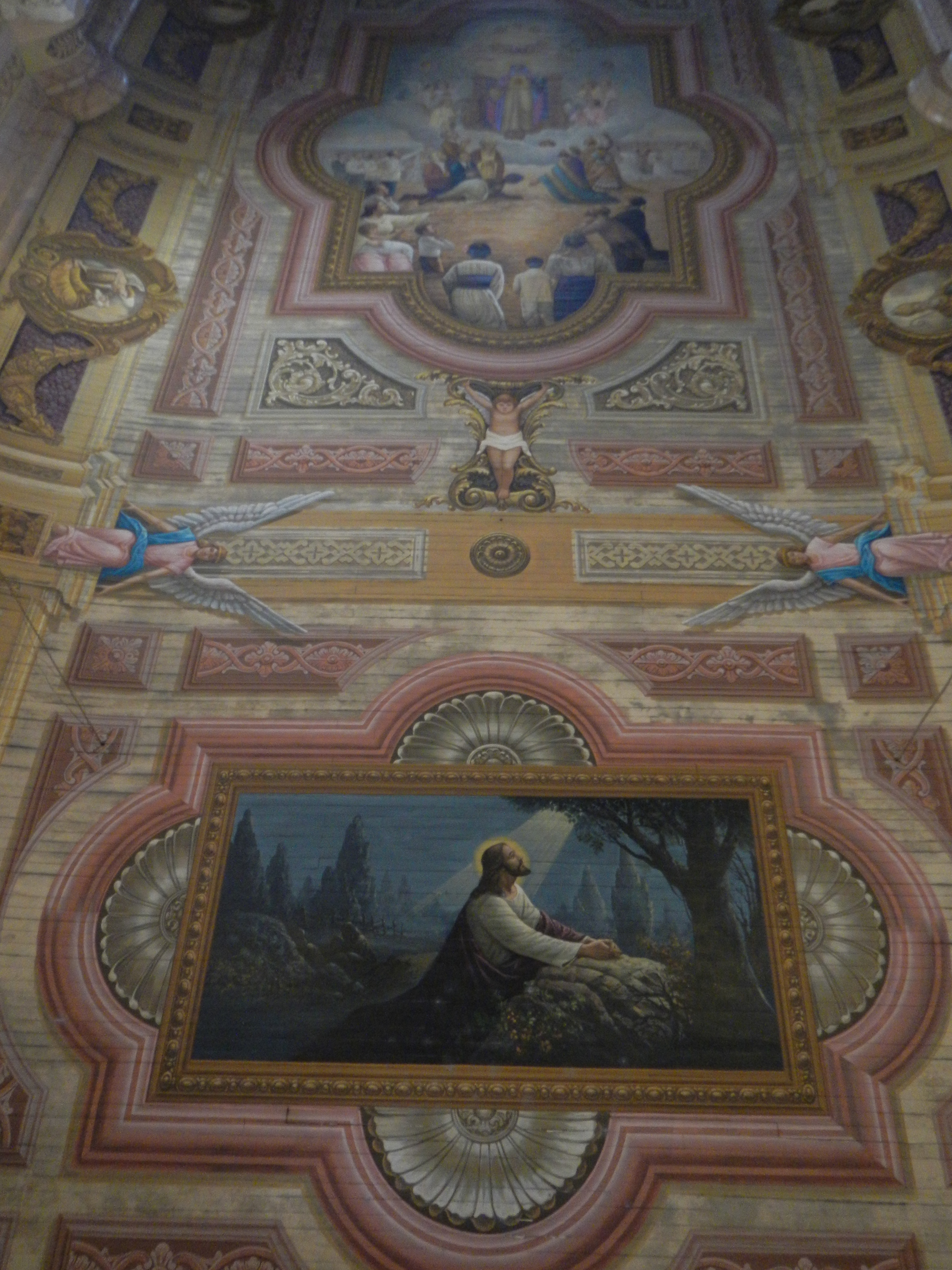

=== Betis church bells ===
In the bell tower, there is a big bell and four smaller ones. One of the small bells bears the inscription of Fray Manuel Camañes, 1891 and Fundicion de Hilario Sunico (who had a famous foundry in San Nicolas, Manila). Sunico is a well-known bell caster and metal master (metalsmith) of old Manila. Hilario Chanuangco - Sunico y Santos, the renowned 19th-century bellcaster was born in 1848 to the Chinese Chan Uan Co and his Spanish mestiza wife Trinidad Santos of Gagalangin, Tondo.

Bells of Betis

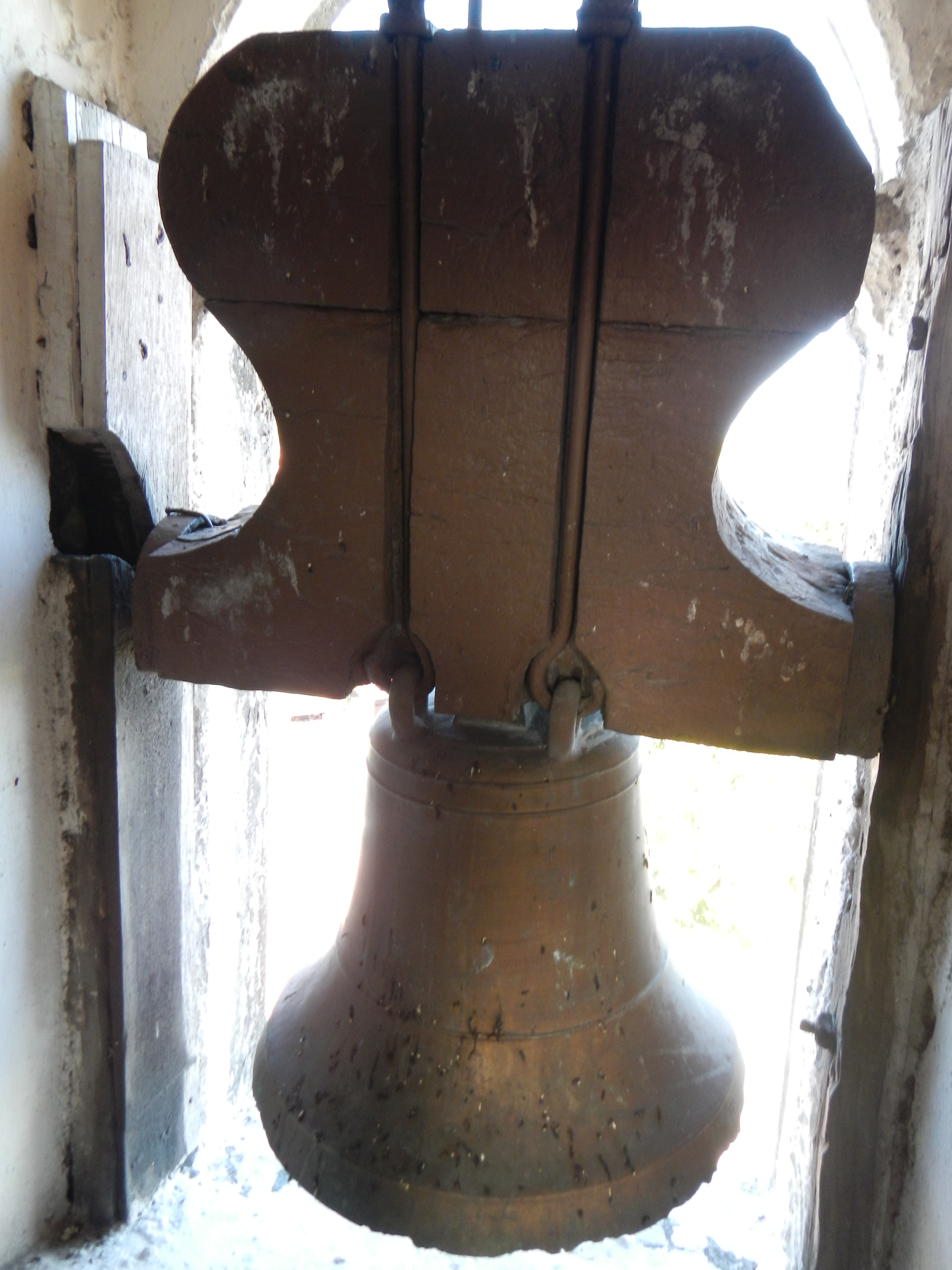
Bell

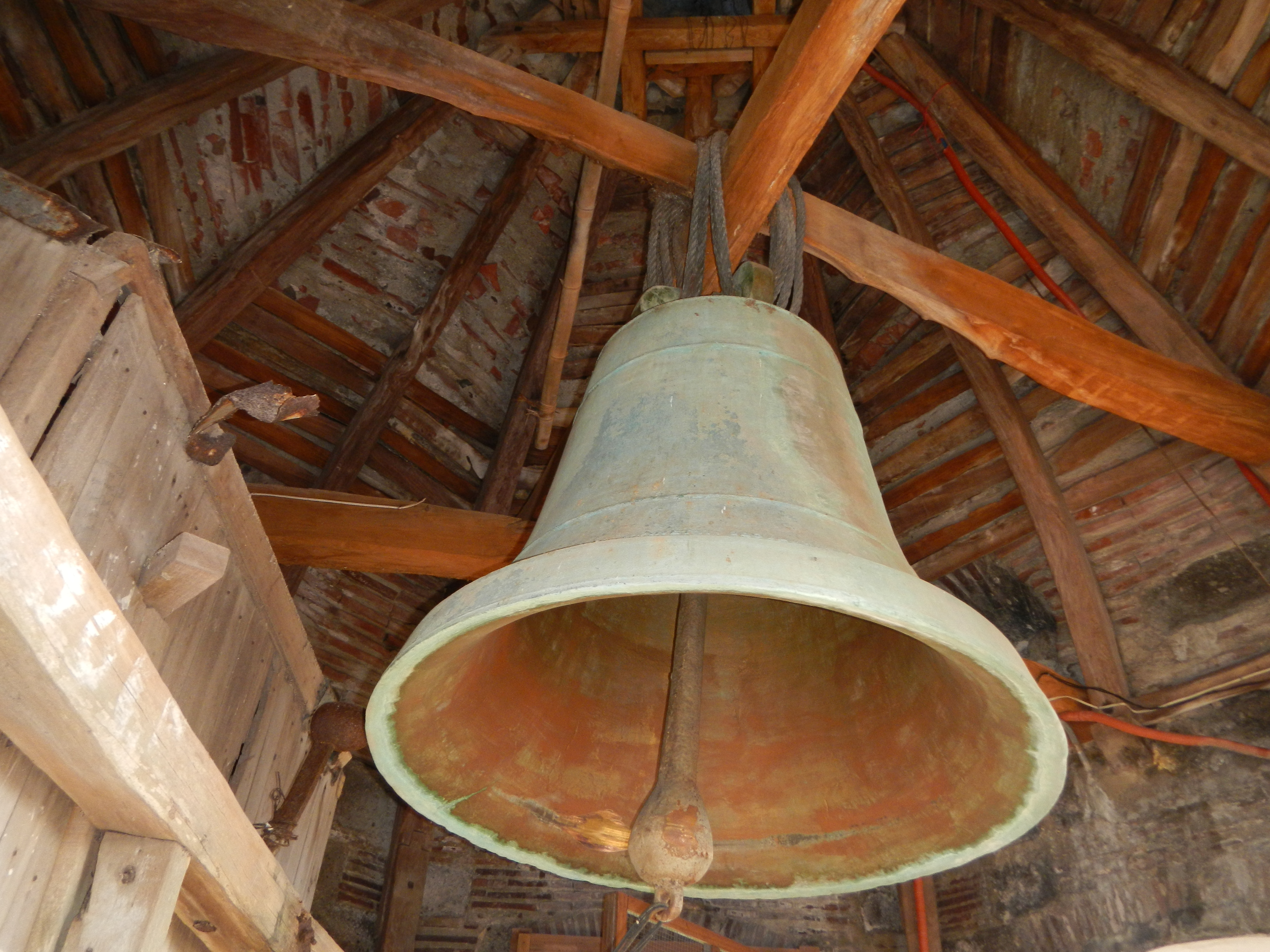
Big bell

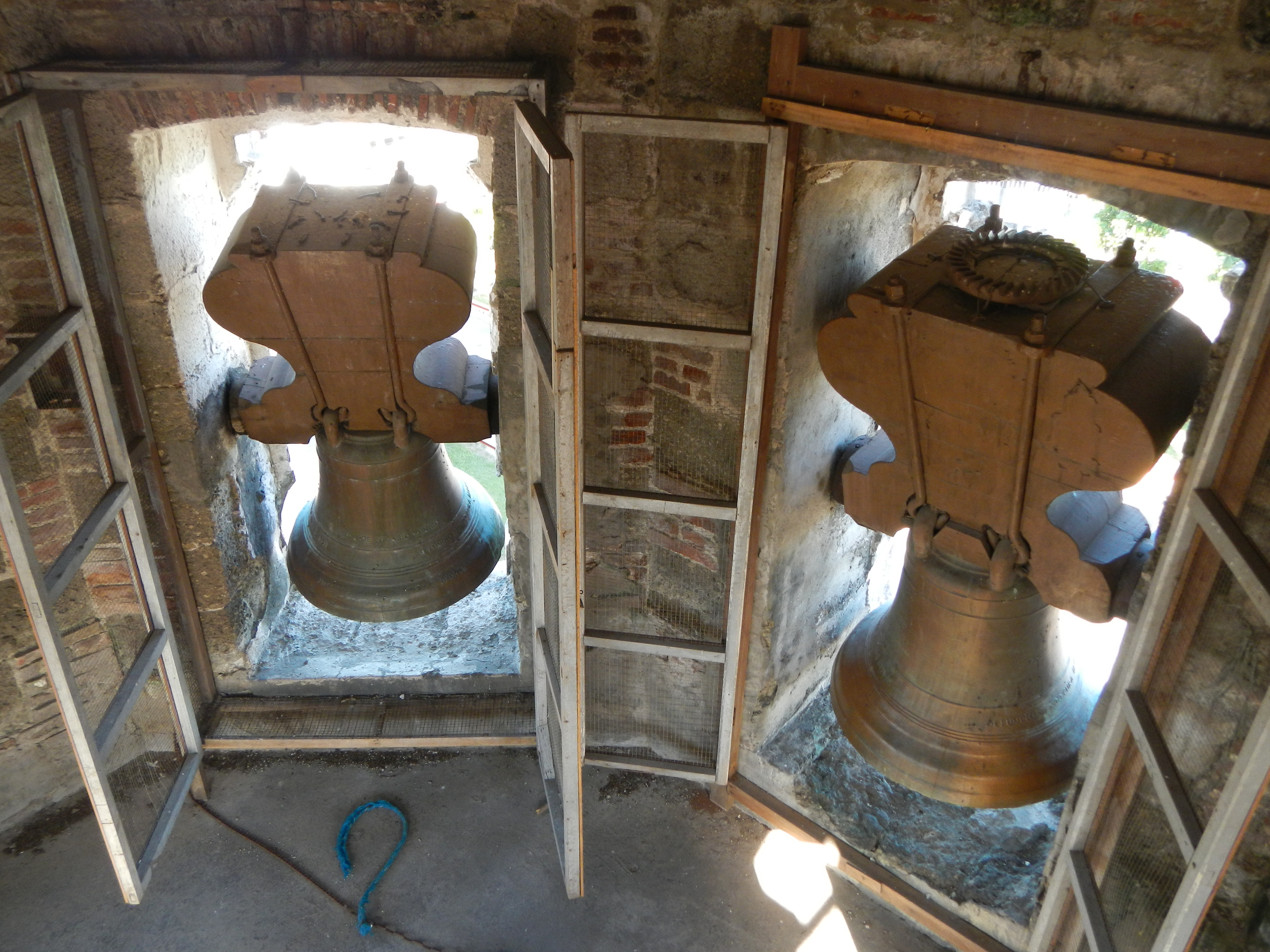
Bells

Around 176 church bells were attributed to him and the Sunico foundry. Among these bells are the principal bells of the Binondo Church and its nine chimes and the principal bell of the Malate Church. The foundry is located along Jaboneros St., The first Sunico bell was cast sometime in 1865 by Chan Uan Co, the Chinese father of Hilario Sunico. The foundry started as a shack. But in the 1880s the shack was torn down to give way to a foundry that cast those huge church bells that hangs today in old Spanish churches—some of them declared as heritage sites.

Aside from bell casting, Hilario is also responsible for the grill works of old Spanish churches and some civil works including the old Puente Colgante in Quiapo and the Tutuban Railway Station in Tondo.

=== Betis artesian well ===
In the last quarter of the 19th century, 1886-1894, Father Manuel Camañes dug an artesian well on the north-side of the church which served as a source of potable water not only for the Betis townsfolk, but to the other nearby towns as well (Jorge, Catalogo, P. 530-531). It was buried in mud and debris until it was unearthed in 1976. It was rehabilitated on July 14, 2006.

Betis Artesian Well

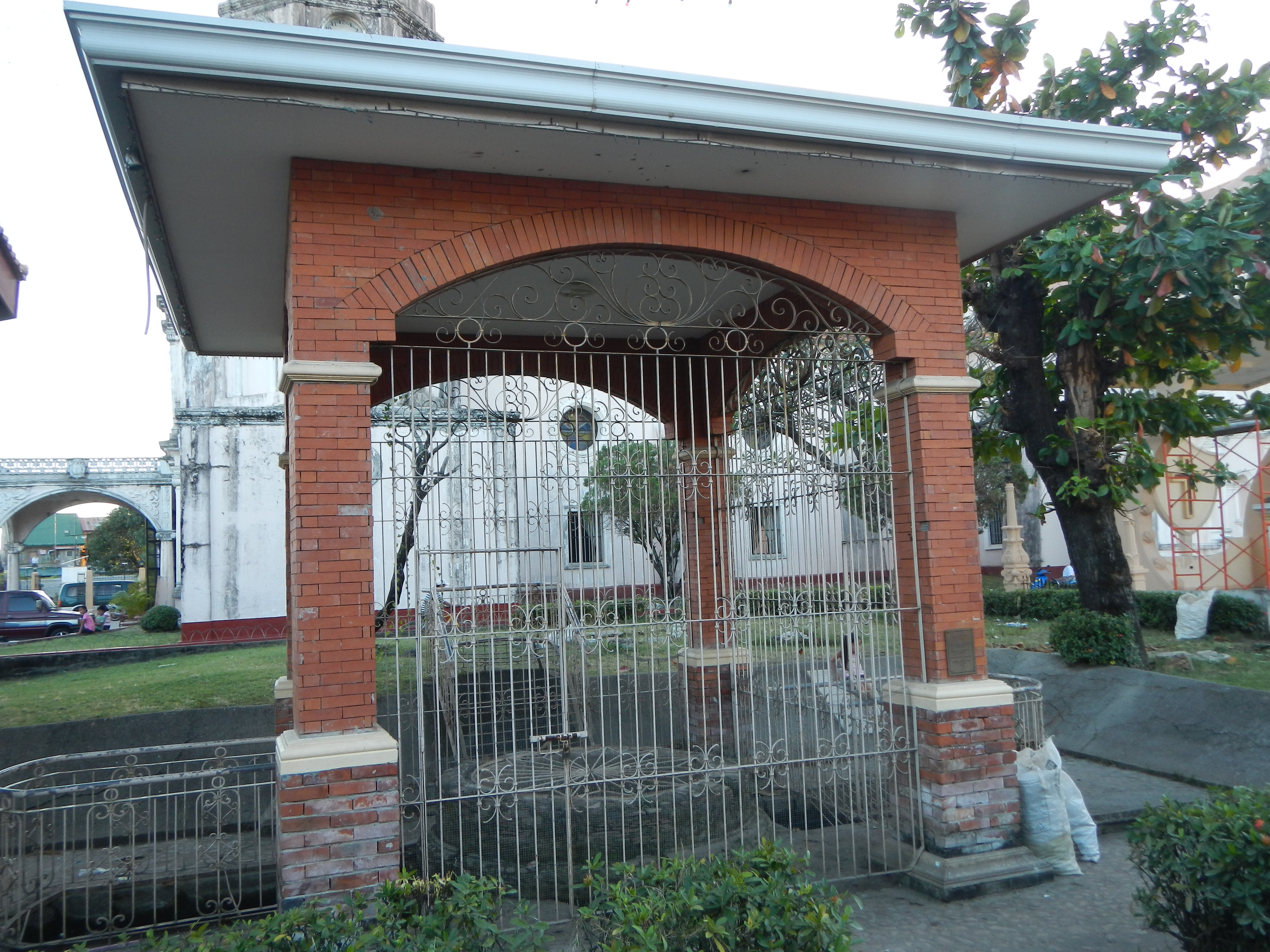
Facade of the Well

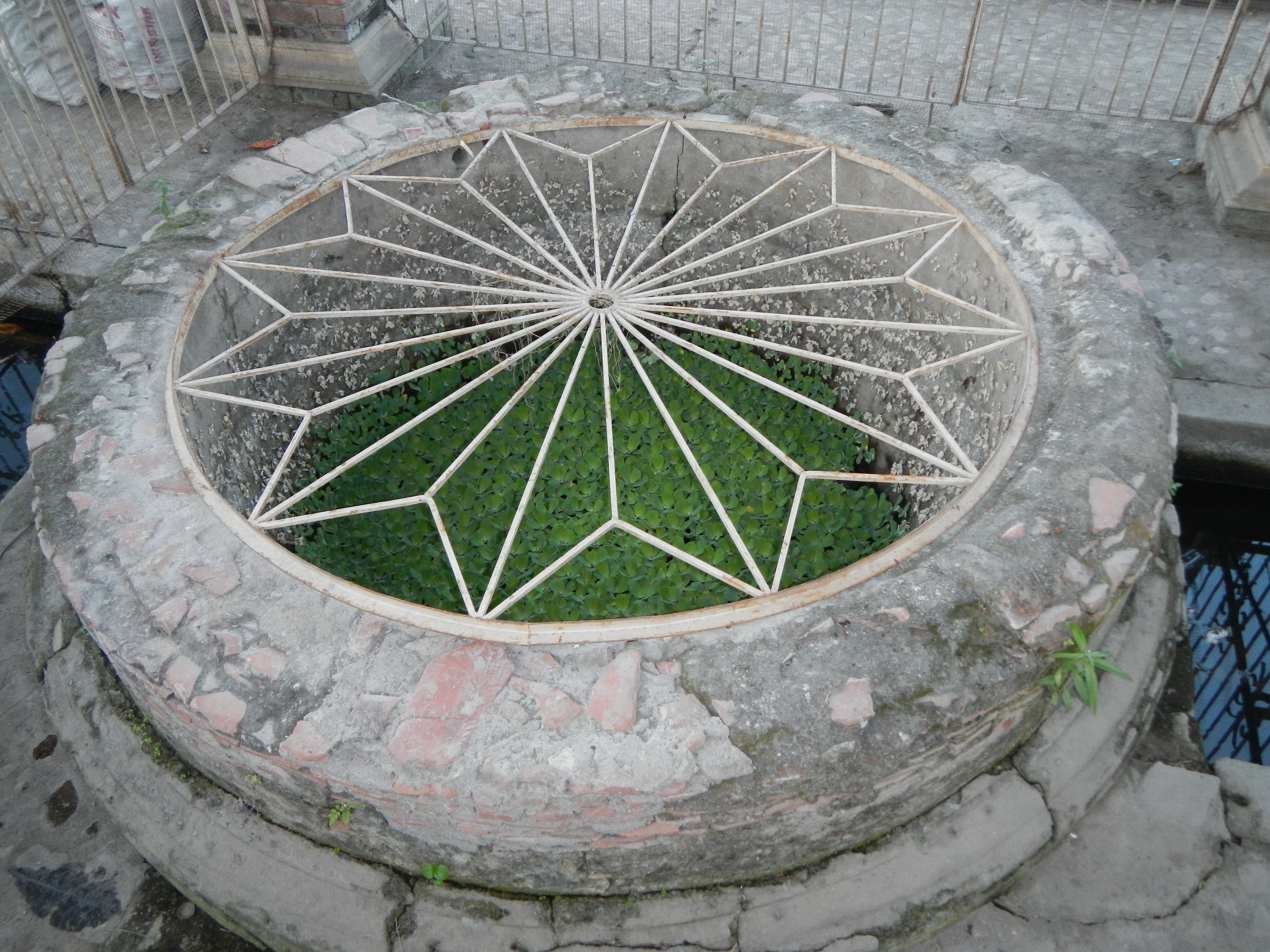
The Artesian Well

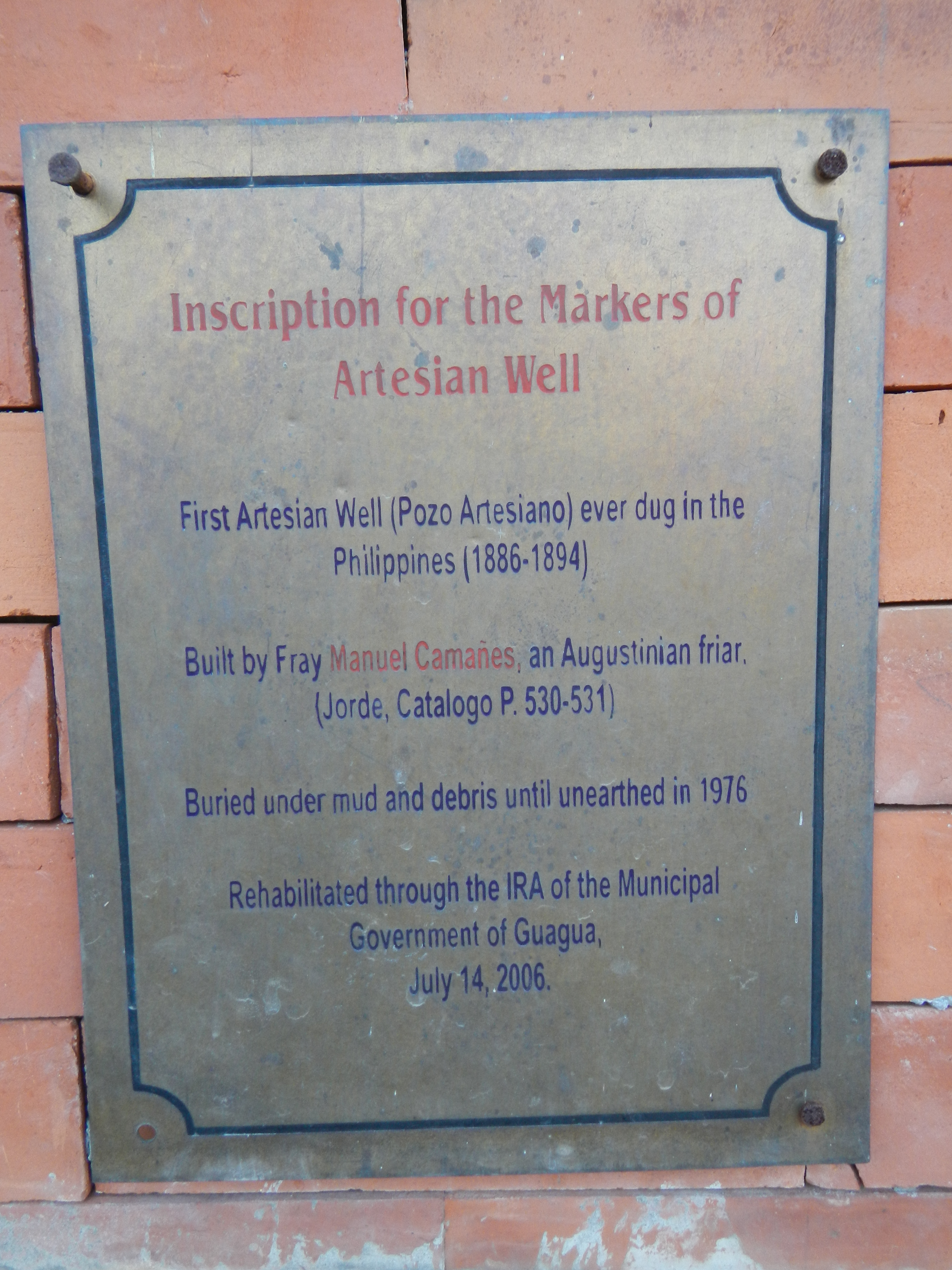
Inscription

The present-day concrete fence with caryatids was built in the 2nd quarter of the 20th century.

=== Betis Museum ===
The idea of renovating and restoring the ground floor of the church's refectory to convert it into a historical mini-museum was one of the major projects of the Betis Town Fiesta Committee 2007. The Committee which was spearheaded by comité de festejo president Florentino Torres who saw the need of a specific place which would serve as an exhibition room where the collections of Betis Church's artifacts, important historical data, old photographs and memorabilia, antique valuable pieces of the old families of the town and other significant documents pertaining to the celebration of its annual fiestas and traditions in the past and of the present will be showcased. The goal is to ignite awareness, interest and sense of pride among the townspeople especially the new generation Betisenos. After several considerations and consensus among the committee's member, it was decided that the refectory of the church will be converted into a museum.

Parish Refectory

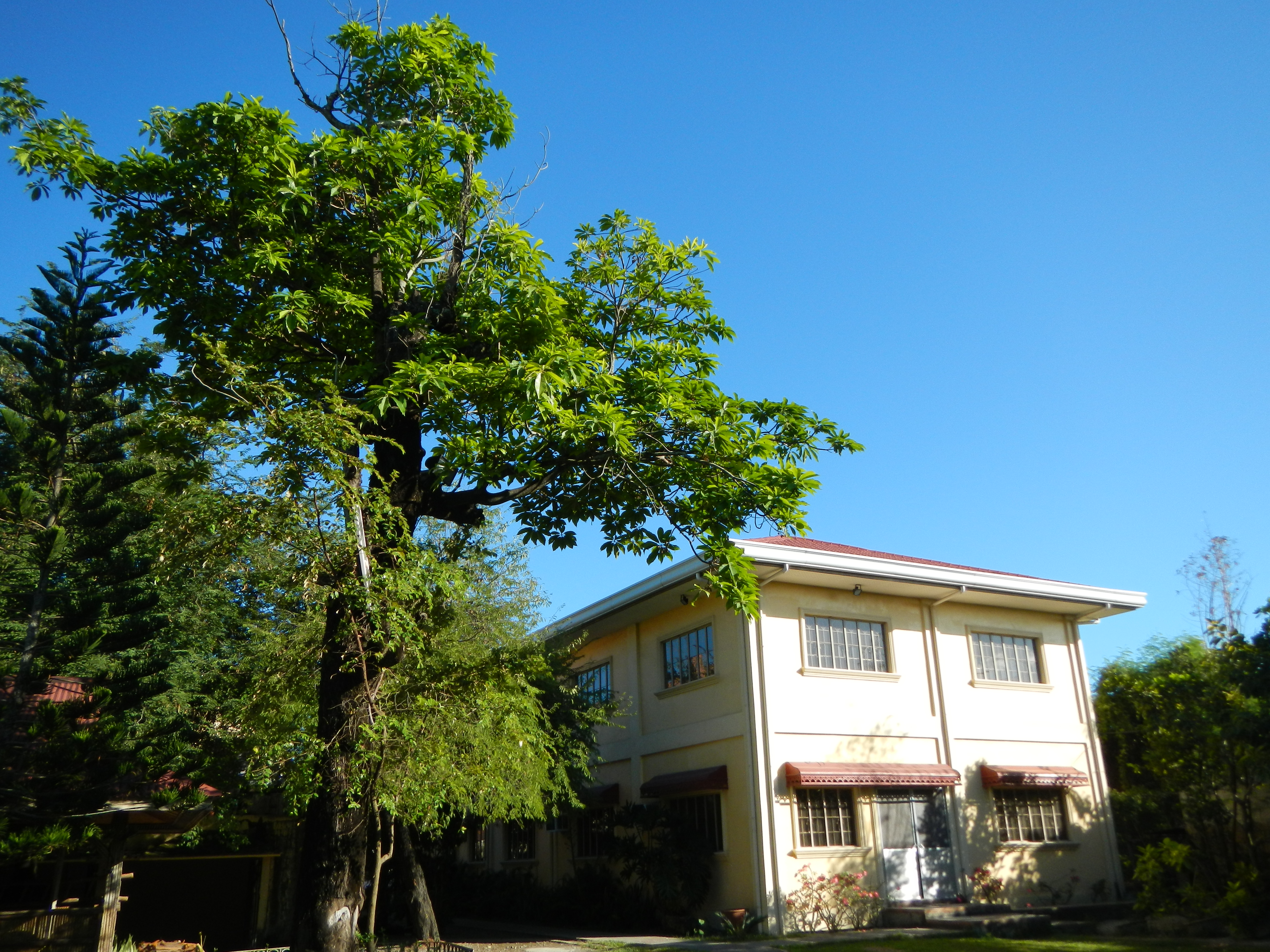
Parish Office and Convent

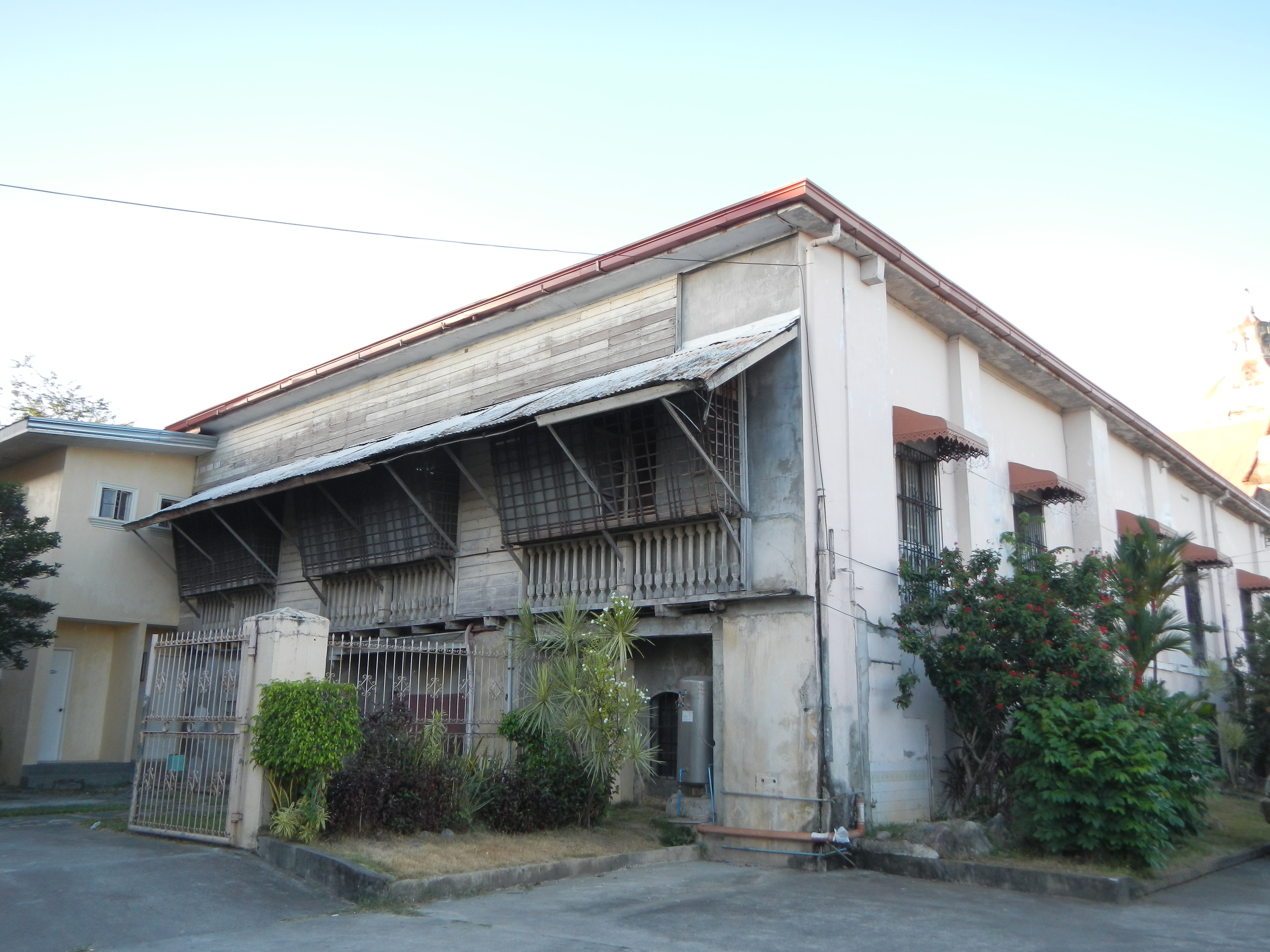
Refectory

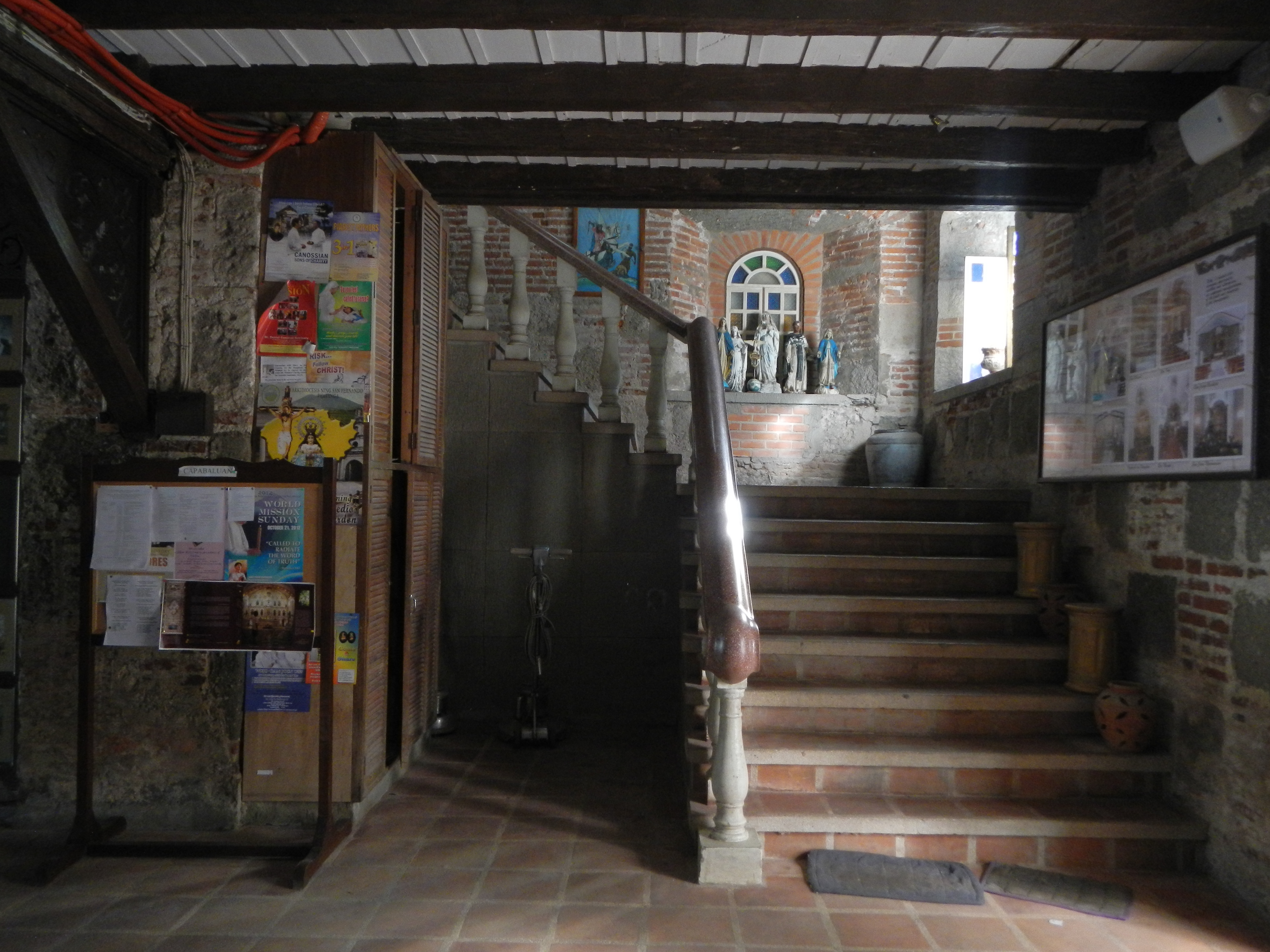
Stairs to refectory

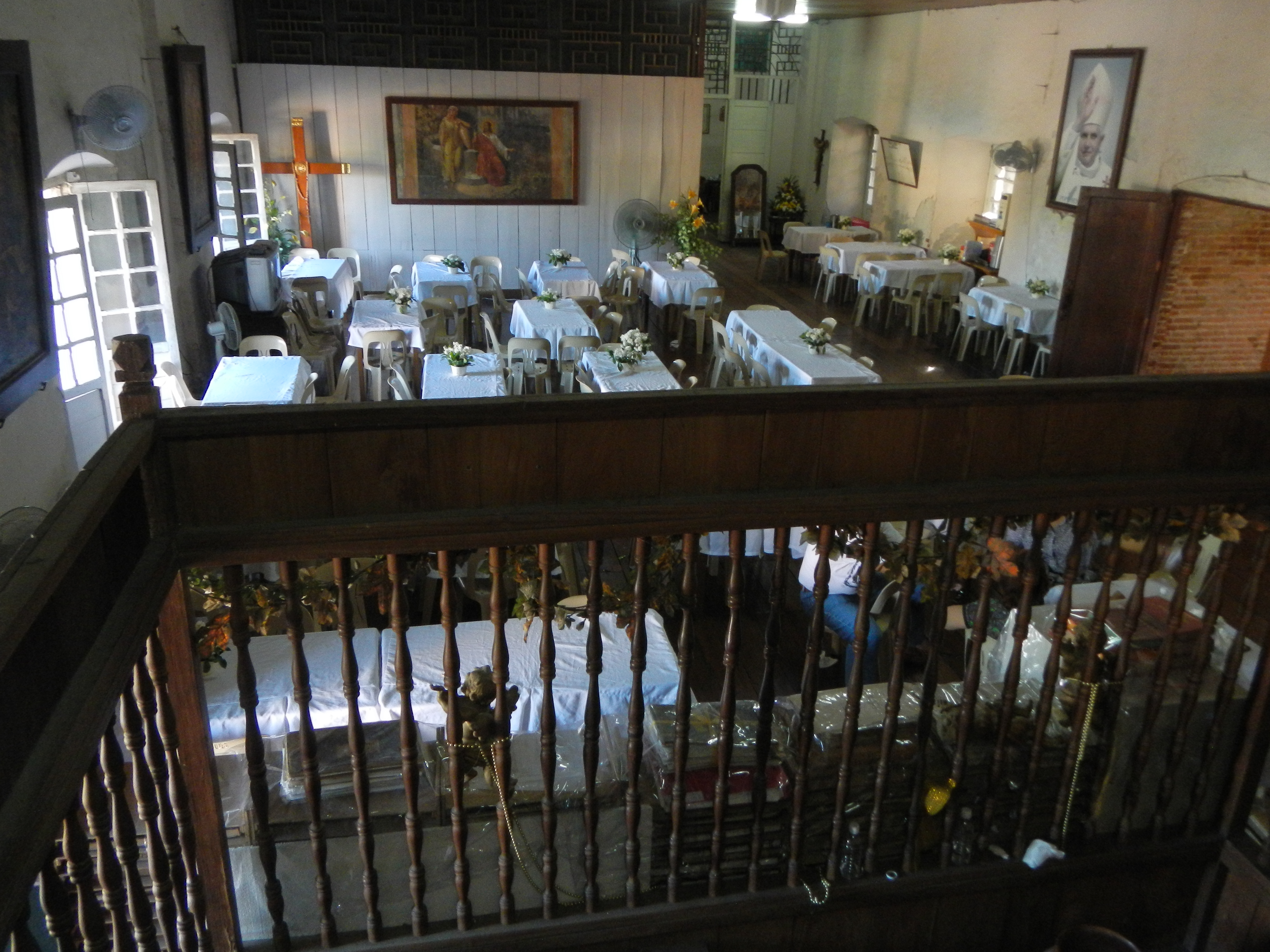
Inside the Refectory

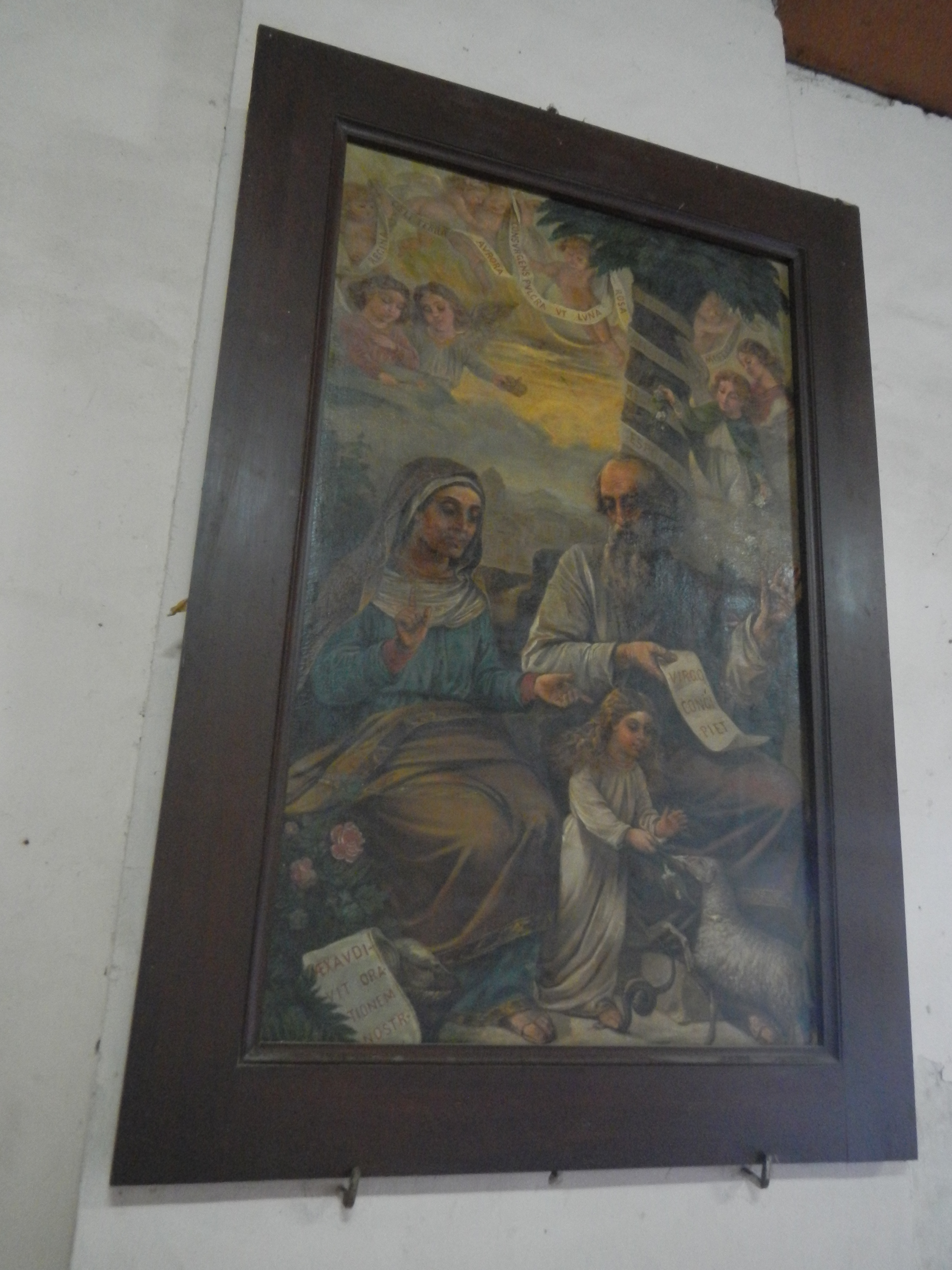
Mounted Painting
Betis Museum

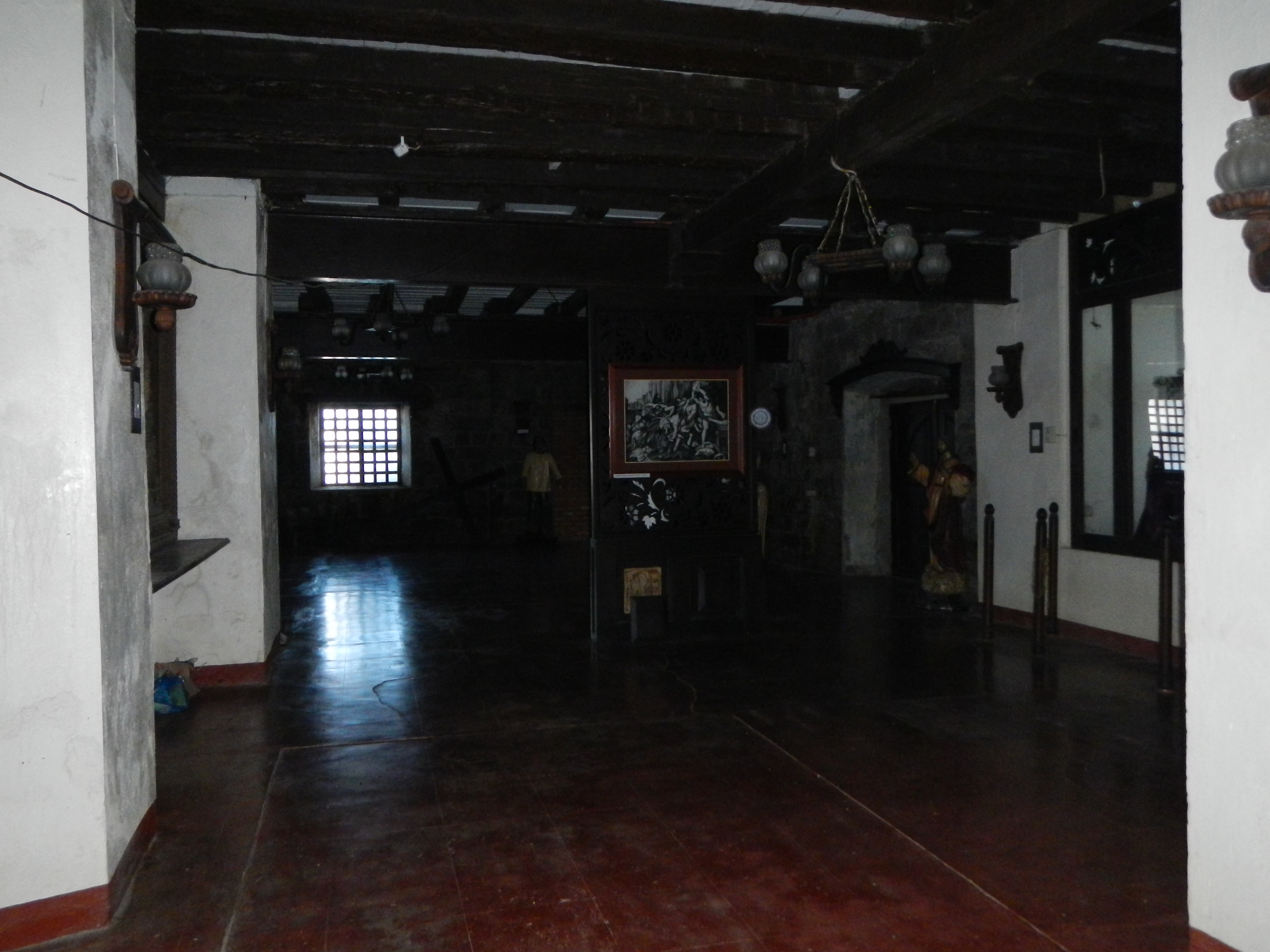
Museum entrance

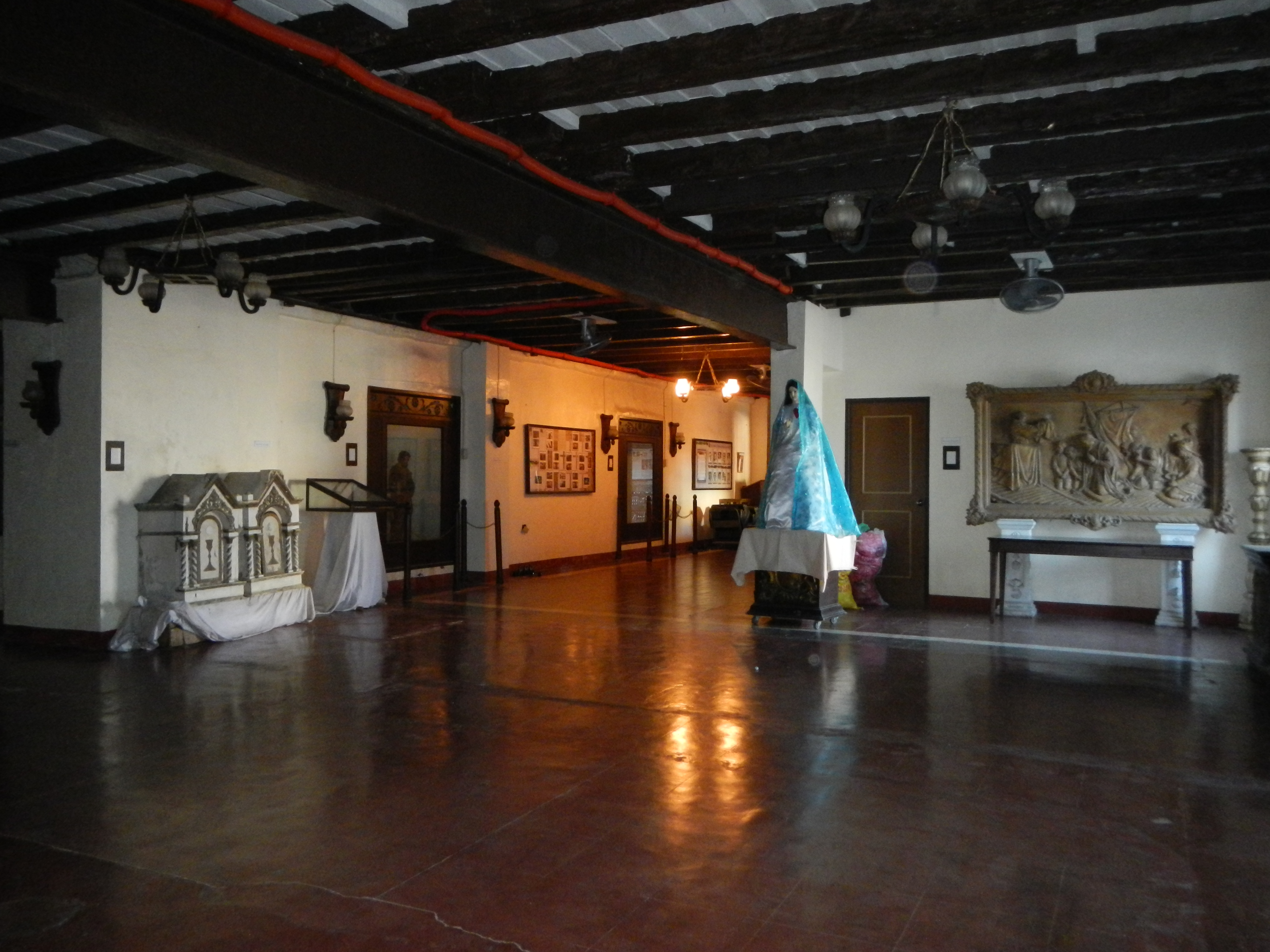
Ground exhibits

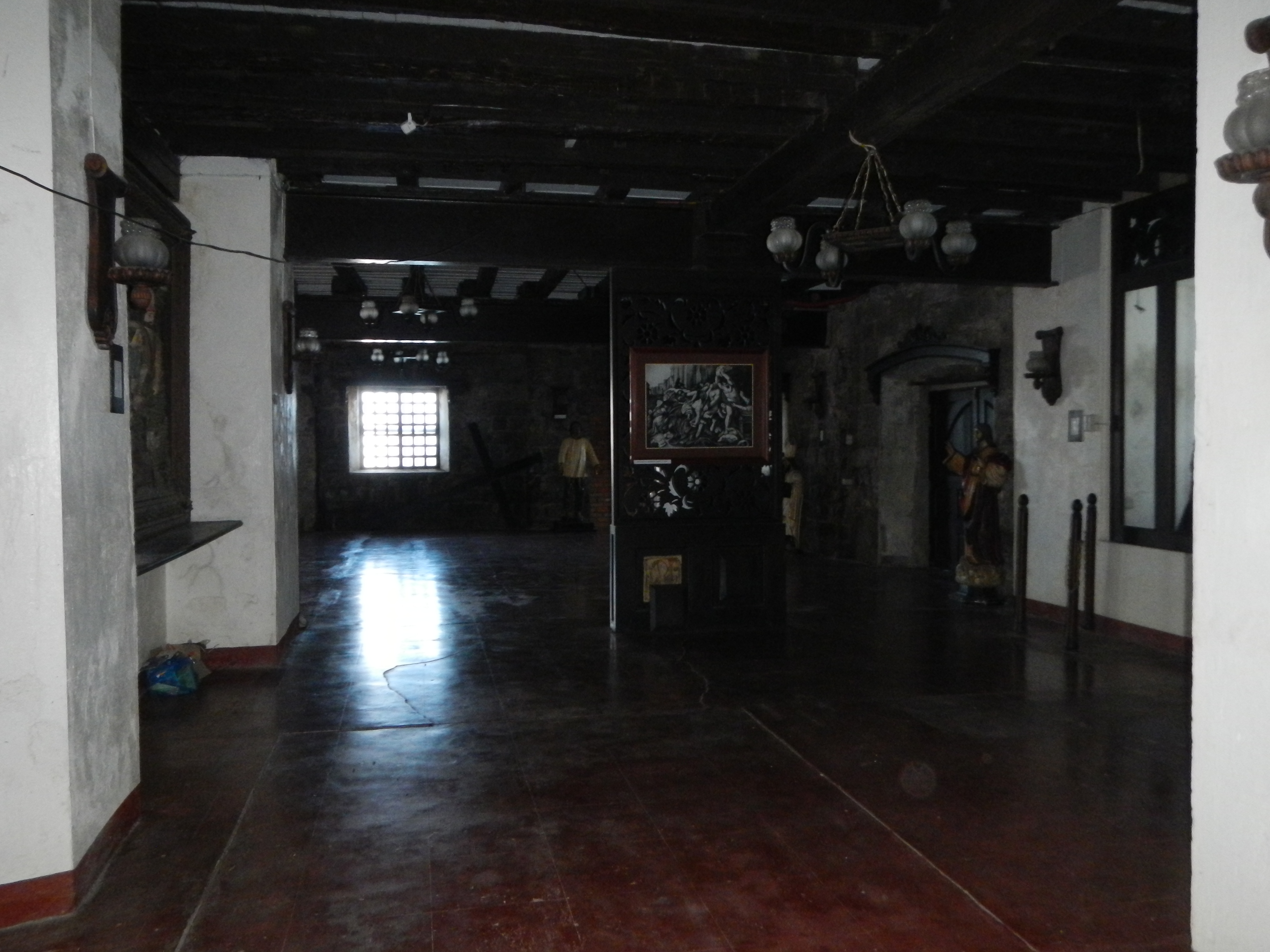
Ground floor of Museum

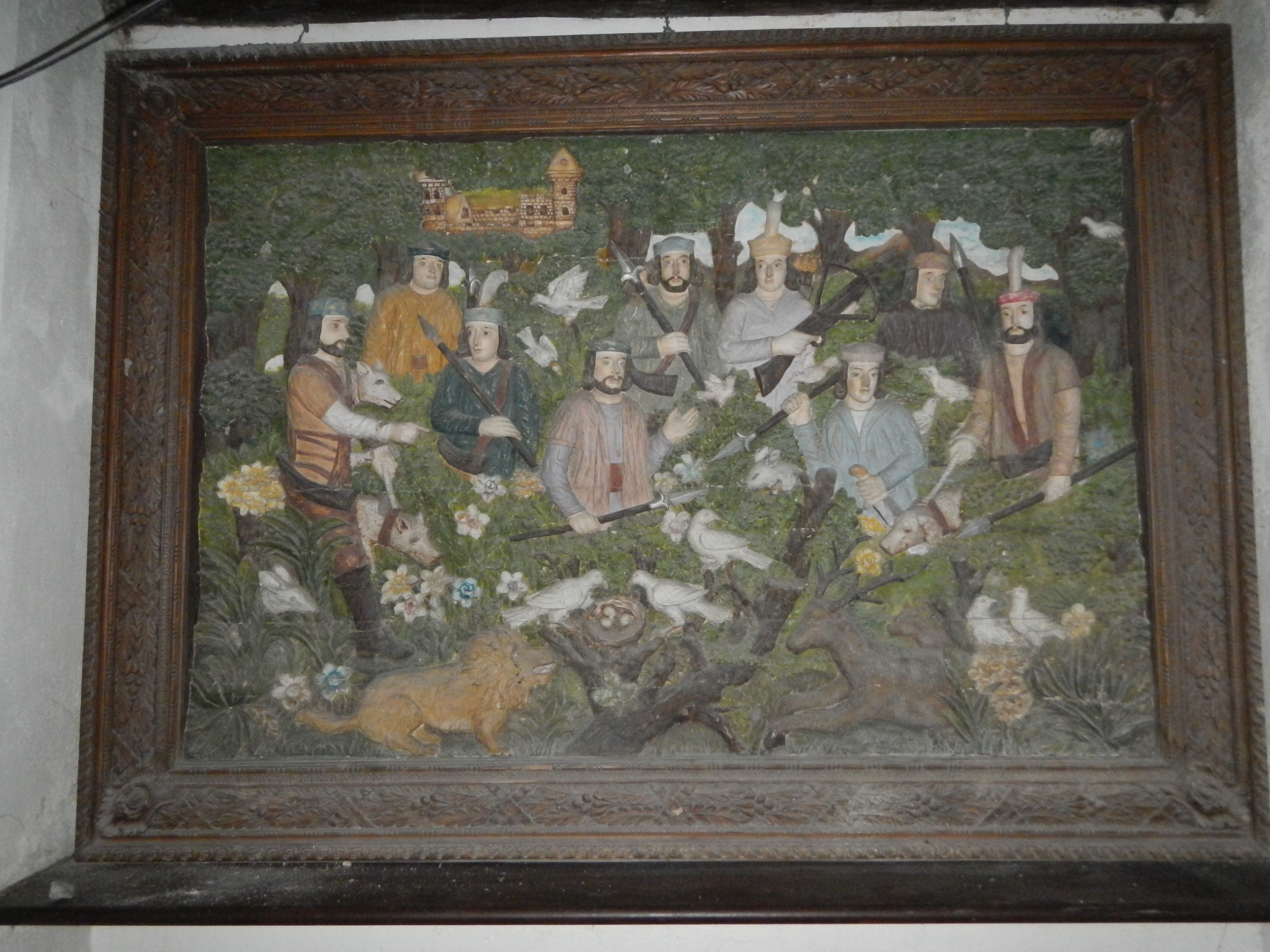
Wood carving

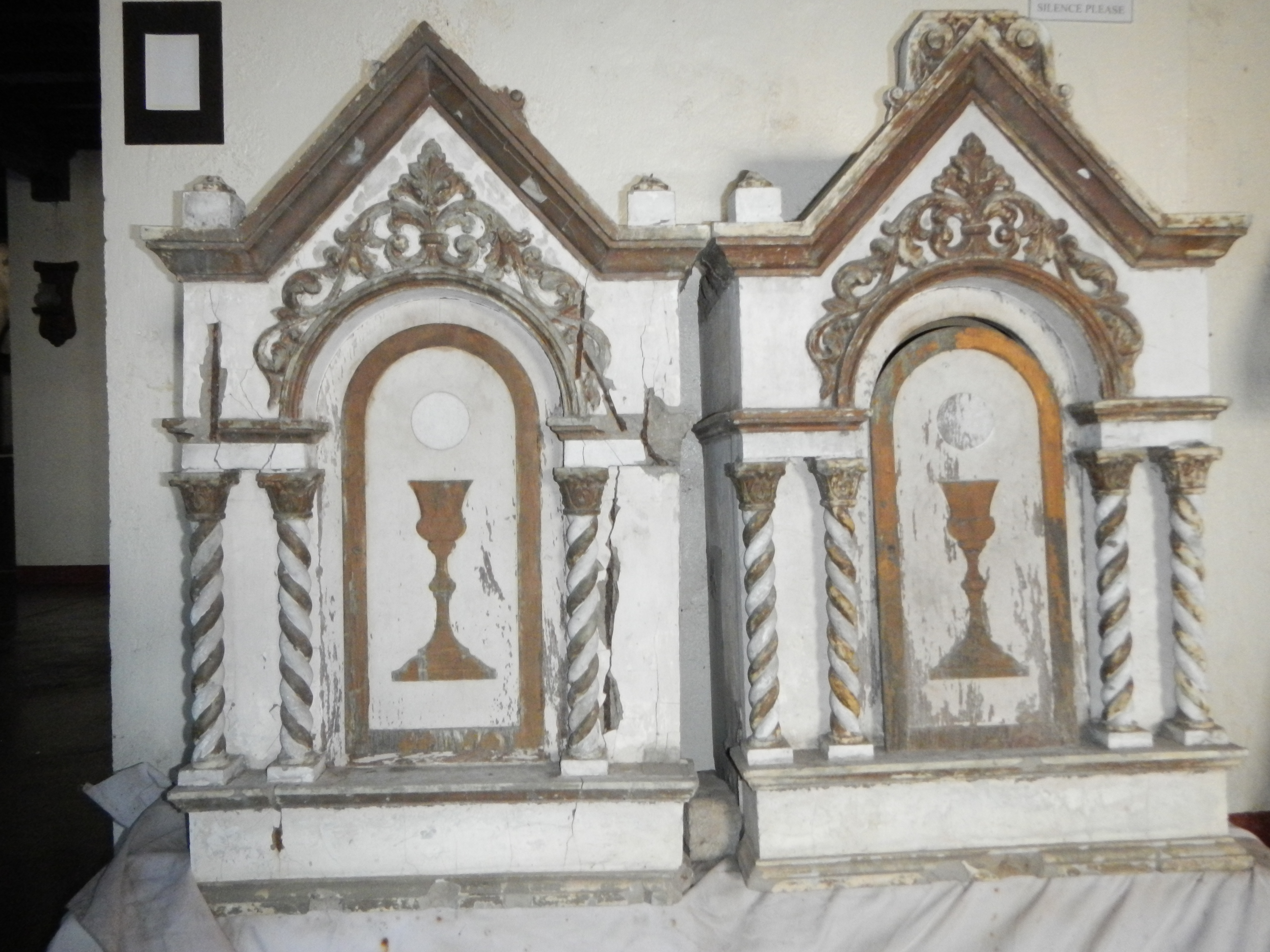
The 2 tabernacles

The whole refectory which housed several precious art pieces of the church remained undeveloped for several years since its renovation in the early 20th century; after it was accidentally burned down in 1908. Since then, it has become a storage room for baptismal and wedding records of the church and it was where the valuable 17th century relief wood sculpture of "Matamoros" was hung on one of the brick posts of the ground floor; the two "Sagrada Familia" oil paintings believed to have been painted by Simón Flores Y de la Rosa which are still found on the south-side of the wall at the second floor; the "Monstrance of Santiago de Galicia" and the few remaining mural paintings of the original ceiling painter of Betis, Macario Ligón Y Nulud. Today, through the support and generosity of the Betis people and the efforts of the Committee of 2007 to relive the glory of the past, the ground floor is now transformed into "Museo Ning Betis".

The renovation of the ground floor took five months to complete. The addition of several interior designs and furniture were actually recycled from a pile of old wood and broken furniture stocked in the refectory's ground floor. Instead of buying new materials, the committee made use of this debris; some were restored and some were converted into brackets for the wall lamps on every post, the base of the chandeliers, the doors of the façade of the museum's entrance, the architrave of the arched windows and even a couple of utilitarian tables which are now located at the secretary's office. The conceived ambience for the whole ground floor was to make it look like the interior of a bahay na bato house.

Today, the collections inside the museum are "Matamoros" (17th Century relief sculpture), "San José Macaquera" (Attributed to the Sazon Family), 1800s original icons of the Betis' church retablo, a relief sculpture by Juan Flores Y Culala, "Salangsang Ning Ilog Betis" by Victor Ramos Y Gaza, "Madonna at Anac" by Willy Layug Y Tadeo and "Inventario de la Parroquia de Betis" (an old notebook which gives account to the 1939-1957 inventory of Padre Santiago Blanco(1939) on the renovation of the church).

The consultants in the restoration procedure were Prof. Armando Burgos of the University of the Philippines Diliman and Prof. Regalado Trota José of University of the Philippines Diliman. Assistant to Prof. Burgos in the research and documentation process was Prof. Ruston Banal Jr, an alumnus of the University of the Philippines Diliman College of Fine Arts and a native of Betis. The consultant to the interior design was Ms. Imelda S, Torres, proprietress of FurnitureVille Inc.

== In popular culture ==
The main sanctuary was used for the church interiors in the 1998 movie Jose Rizal, representing the San Diego Parish in the Noli Me Tangere segments as well as other church-setting scenes.
