= Personnel of the Imperial Trans-Antarctic Expedition =

The Imperial Trans-Antarctic Expedition was an attempt to cross the Antarctic continent led by Ernest Shackleton. The personnel were divided into two groups: the Weddell Sea party consisting of the men who would attempt the crossing and their support, and the Ross Sea party whose job it was to lay stores on the far side of the Pole for the members of the Weddell Sea party who would make the crossing. Both arms of the expedition had a final complement of 28 men. The Weddell Sea party's ship Endurance was crushed in pack ice and the crossing attempt was never made. All the Weddell Sea party were rescued, but several members of the Ross Sea party perished after their support ship Aurora broke free from its mooring post and drifted away, leaving the shore party stranded.

Names and dates of birth are included where known. After Endurance was lost, the Weddell Sea party spent some months camped on the ice before making for Elephant Island in the three lifeboats salvaged from the vessel, the James Caird, the Dudley Docker and the Stancomb Wills. The boat each man was assigned to for the crossing is listed.

Some of the original crew left the expedition to sign up when war was declared with Germany, (Note: Among these were Douglas George Jeffrey, who later joined Shackleton's final expedition; Courtney Brocklehurst and F. Dobbs who would have been in charge of the dog sections; and V. Studd, the original geologist.) and others returned to England after the ship put in at Buenos Aires.

== Weddell Sea party ==
	Name	Life	Boat	Position	Additional information
	Sir Ernest Shackleton	1874–1922	James Caird	Commander	James Caird rescue crew
	Frank Wild	1873–1939	James Caird	Second-in-command	Cape Wild namesake
	Frank Worsley	1872–1943	Dudley Docker	Captain	James Caird rescue crew
	Frank Hurley	1885–1962	James Caird	Photographer	
	Hubert Hudson (Note: Often seen as Hubert)	1886–1942	Stancomb Wills	Navigator	Original Stancomb Willis captain
	Lionel Greenstreet	1889–1979	Dudley Docker	First officer	
	Tom Crean	1877–1938	Stancomb Wills	Second officer	James Caird rescue crew
	Alfred Cheetham	1867–1918	Dudley Docker	Third officer	
	Lewis Rickinson	1883–1945	Stancomb Wills (Note: Accidentally omitted from Worsley's list)	Chief engineer	Suspected heart attack on Elephant Island
	Alexander Kerr	1892–1964	Dudley Docker	Second engineer	
	James McIlroy	1879–1968	Stancomb Wills	Surgeon	
	Alexander Macklin	1889–1967	Dudley Docker	Surgeon	
	Robert Clark	1882–1950	James Caird	Biologist	
	Leonard Hussey	1891–1964	James Caird	Meteorologist	
	James Wordie	1889–1962	James Caird	Geologist	
	Reginald James	1891–1964	James Caird	Physicist	
|	George Marston	1882–1940	Dudley Docker	Artist	
	Thomas Orde-Lees	1877–1958	Dudley Docker	Storekeeper; motor expert	
	Harry "Chippy" McNish (Note: McNeish and MacNish are commonly seen)	1874–1930	James Caird	Carpenter	James Caird rescue crew; not recommended for Polar medal
	Charles Green	1888–1974	James Caird	Cook	
	William Stephenson	1889–1953	Stancomb Wills	Fireman; stoker	Not recommended for Polar medal
	Ernest Holness	1892–1924	Dudley Docker	Fireman; stoker	Not recommended for Polar medal
	John Vincent	1879–1941	James Caird	Able seaman	James Caird rescue crew; not recommended for Polar medal
	Timothy McCarthy	1888–1917	James Caird	Able seaman	James Caird rescue crew
	Walter How	1885–1972	Stancomb Wills	Able seaman	
	William Bakewell	1888–1969	Stancomb Wills	Able seaman	Recruited in Buenos Aires; American claiming to be Canadian
	Thomas McLeod	1869–1960	Dudley Docker	Able seaman	
	Perce Blackborow (Note: Blackborrow or Blackboro often used for Blackborow and Percy occasionally seen for Perce)	1894–1949	Stancomb Wills	Steward	Stowaway; hidden aboard by Bakewell; gangrenous toes of left foot amputated
	Sir Daniel Gooch	1869–1926		Dog handler	Returned home after South Georgia stop
	Mrs Chippy	–1915			McNish's male cat; shot after Endurance sinking

== Ross Sea party ==
Shore party
Name	Born	Died	Position	Additional information
Aeneas Mackintosh	1879	1916	Commander	Died during the expedition
Ernest Joyce	1875	1940	Sledging Equipment and Dogs	
Ernest Wild	1879	1918	Storekeeper	
Reverend Arnold Spencer-Smith	1883	1916	Chaplain and Photographer	Died during the expedition
John Lachlan Cope	1893	1947	Biologist and Surgeon	
Alexander Stevens	1886	1965	Chief Scientist	
Richard W Richards	1894	1986	Physicist	Would become the last member of the Expedition to pass away
Andrew Keith Jack	1885	1966	Physicist	
Irvine Gaze	1890	1978	General Assistant	
Victor Hayward	1887	1916	General Assistant	Died during the expedition

Aboard the Aurora
Name	Born	Died	Position	Additional information
Aubrey Howard Ninnis	1883	1956	Motor Tractor Specialist	Intended for the shore party but stranded when the Aurora broke adrift
Lionel Hooke	1895	1974	Wireless Telegraph Operator	Intended for the shore party but stranded when the Aurora broke adrift
Joseph Stenhouse	1887	1941	1st Officer (subsequently Captain)	
Leslie Thomson			2nd Officer	
Alfred Larkman	1890	1962	Chief Engineer	
C. Adrian Donnelly/Donolly (Note: Donolly spelling used in South)			2nd Engineer	
James Paton	1869	1918	Boatswain	
Clarence Maugher/Mauger (Note: Mauger spelling used in South)			Carpenter	
Sydney Atkin			Able Seaman	
Arthur Downing			Able Seaman	
William Kavanagh			Able Seaman	
A. "Shorty" Warren			Able Seaman	
Charles Glidden			Ordinary Seaman	
S. Grady/Grade (Note: Referred to as Grade in South)			Fireman	
William Mugridge			Fireman	
Harold Shaw			Fireman	
Edwin Thomas Wise	1872	1943	Cook	
Emile d'Anglade			Steward	
