= Alexander Macklin =

British doctor and explorer (1889–1967)

Alexander Macklin OBE MC TD
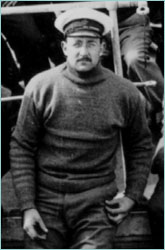
- Born: Alexander Hepburne Macklin; 1 September 1889; India, New Delhi
- Died: 21 March 1967 (aged 77); Aberdeen, Scotland
- Occupations: Physician, explorer and Surgeon

Alexander Hepburne Macklin OBE MC TD (1 September 1889 – 21 March 1967) was a Scottish physician who served as one of the two surgeons on Sir Ernest Shackleton's Imperial Trans-Antarctic Expedition of 1914–1917. In 1921–1922, he joined the Shackleton–Rowett Expedition aboard the Quest. He was also a dog trainer and quartermaster on Shackleton’s expeditions.

== Early life ==
Alexander Macklin was born on 1 September 1889 in India, New Delhi. When the family returned to Britain, Dr Macklin set up practice in the Scilly Isles, where young Macklin, just 13 years old, became an enthusiastic and proficient boat handler. He went to Plymouth College and then to the University of London. After working for a short amount of time as a deckhand, he continued his education at the Victoria University of Manchester, where he qualified as a surgeon/doctor.

== Imperial Trans-Antarctic Expedition ==
Soon after qualifying he applied to join Shackleton's expedition and was accepted. As well as his surgeon's duties he was put in charge of the ship's dogs and was also assigned a team of sledge dogs to drive. The Endurance became trapped in the ice and was later crushed, forcing Shackleton to lead his men across the ice to open water where they travelled by boat to Elephant Island. After the ship became trapped in the ice, Macklin's dog team was put to work. He brought back several seals that had been shot for food, and once the men began the long trek across the ice, he and the other dog teams were sent back to Ocean Camp (the first camp established near the ship) to fetch supplies. Eventually all the dogs had to be shot, but Macklin's team was the last to be killed.

After arriving at Elephant Island, Shackleton and five men took one of the boats, the James Caird, and set out to fetch help from South Georgia. Macklin and McIlroy, the other surgeon, were left behind as Shackleton knew the skills would be required more on the island than on the boat: Rickinson had a heart condition, Hudson was suffering a nervous breakdown. Blackborow had gangrene in his toes and shortly after the boat left, Macklin and McIlroy were forced to amputate all the toes on his left foot; Macklin gave him a chloroform anaesthetic while McIlroy removed the toes. Like most of the crew, Macklin was awarded the Silver Polar Medal for his efforts during the expedition.

== After the expedition ==
On his return to Britain, Macklin gained a commission as a temporary lieutenant in the Royal Army Medical Corps (RAMC), with effect from 22 November 1916. He was promoted to temporary captain on 22 November 1917. During World War I he served in France, Russia and Italy. He won the Military Cross (MC) for bravery in tending the wounded under fire while serving in Italy.

After the war, Macklin continued to serve with the RAMC, seeing service with the Allied Expeditionary Force in Northern Russia along with his old Boss, Shackleton. He rose to the acting rank of major on 4 May 1919 and, for his service in Russia, was appointed an Officer of the Order of the British Empire on 11 November 1919 and awarded the Russian Order of Saint Stanislaus. He resigned his commission on 23 March 1920, retaining the rank of captain.

Together with former Endurance crew members Worsley, Hussey, Wild, McIlroy, Kerr, McLeod and Charles Green, Shackleton invited Macklin to join him for the Shackleton–Rowett Expedition in 1922 on board the Quest. The ship was plagued by engine trouble and eventually diverted to Rio de Janeiro. After repairs lasting several weeks, the Quest headed for South Georgia. Shackleton was troubled with heart pain throughout the voyage, but despite Macklin's orders refused to rest. In Rio, Shackleton suffered a heart attack but would not let Macklin examine him. The ship landed in South Georgia on 4 January 1922. Early in the morning of 5 January, Macklin was called to Shackleton's quarters to find him having another heart attack. He died shortly after Macklin arrived. As the ship's surgeon, it was Macklin's role to prepare the body for burial on South Georgia.

In 1925 Macklin relocated to Dundee and began work at the Dundee Royal Infirmary, where he would work for the next 21 years. At the start of World War II, he returned to active service as a major in the Medical Corps, serving in East Africa and rising to lieutenant-colonel. He received the Territorial Decoration (TD), and retired from the army in August 1948 with the honorary rank of colonel.

He married Jean in 1947 and moved to Aberdeen where he worked as the physician of student health services at the University of Aberdeen. Though he retired from university practice in 1960, he continued to work at the Aberdeen Royal Infirmary as a locum house surgeon. He and Jean had two sons, Alexander and Richard. He died on 21 March 1967.

== Bibliography ==
- "Endurance Obituaries: Dr. Alexander Hepburne Macklin". HMS Endurance Tracking Project. 2005. Archived from the original on 9 February 2006.
- "Antarctic Explorers: Ernest Shackleton". South Pole.com. Archived from the original on 8 January 2007.
- Paul Ward (2001). "Dr. Alexander Hepburne Macklin". Cool Antarctica. Archived from the original on 3 February 2007.
- Sir Ernest Shackleton (1999) [1919]. South. Great Britain: Penguin Books. ISBN 0-14-028886-4.
- Dr. David McLean (1994). "The Malleson Memorial Lecture: Giants in our genesis". Archived from the original on 10 June 2007.
