= South (book) =

1919 book by Ernest Shackleton

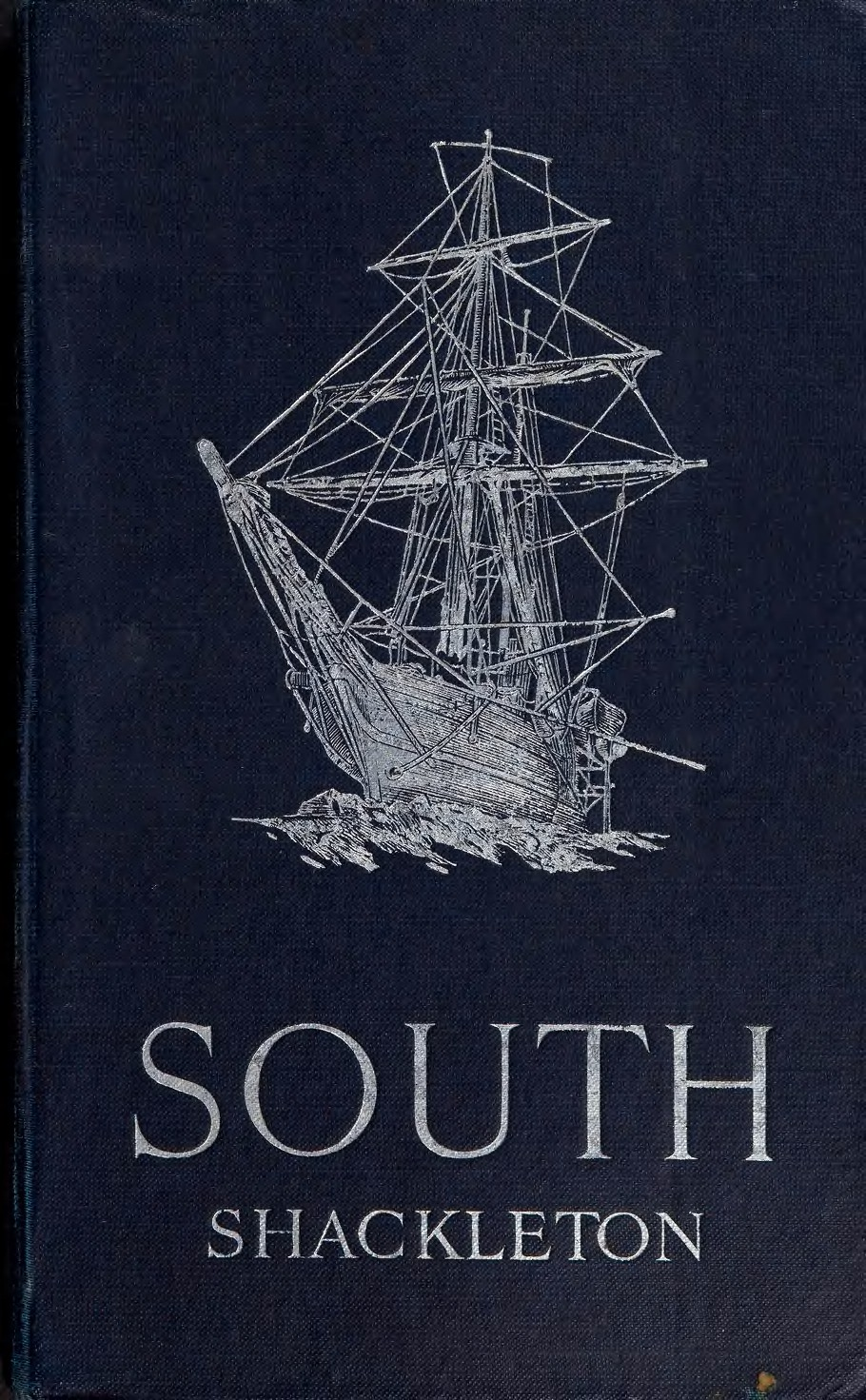
- Second edition, December 1919
- Author: Ernest Shackleton
- Language: English
- Publisher: William Heinemann
- Publication date: 1919
- Publication place: United Kingdom
- Text: South at Wikisource

South is a book by Ernest Shackleton describing the second expedition to Antarctica led by him, the Imperial Trans-Antarctic Expedition of 1914 to 1917. It was published in London by William Heinemann in 1919.

== Background ==
The book of Shackleton's earlier Nimrod Expedition of 1907–1909 was written, based on Shackleton's dictation, by Edward Saunders, a reporter on the Lyttelton Times in Christchurch, New Zealand. Saunders was recommended to Shackleton by the Prime Minister of New Zealand, Sir Joseph Ward; he accompanied Shackleton to Britain to work on The Heart of the Antarctic, which appeared in November 1909. Saunders was again involved in South, Shackleton working with Saunders in New Zealand and Australia early in 1917. Saunders later wrote, "If I said that any chapter was entirely mine, I should be telling an untruth. My work was complementary to his. I could say that Shackleton had a remarkable gift of literary suggestion...."

Leonard Hussey, a member of the expedition, was with Shackleton during the north Russian campaign, and did the final editing without payment.

The rights of the book were assigned to the heirs of Sir Robert Lucas-Tooth, a benefactor of the expedition, who died in 1915. Shackleton was unable to repay money borrowed for the expedition. Lucas-Tooth's heirs required repayment of the loan; other benefactors had written off their loans.

The book is dedicated to "my comrades who fell in the White Warfare of the South and on the red fields of France and Flanders".

== Summary ==
In the preface, Shackleton wrote "... I think that though failure in the actual accomplishment must be recorded, there are chapters in this book of high adventure, strenuous days, lonely nights, unique experiences, and above all, records of unflinching determination, supreme loyalty and generous self-sacrifice on the part of my men which ... still will be of interest to readers who now turn gladly from the red horror of war ... to read ... the tale of the White Warfare of the South."

The preface includes the programme published before the expedition. The Endurance would take the Transcontinental party to the Weddell Sea; the Transcontinental party would cross the Antarctic continent, about 1,800 miles (2,900 km), from the Weddell Sea to the Ross Sea via the South Pole. It would be the first such journey; it was hoped it would be completed in about five months. On the other side of the pole, the Aurora would take out the Ross Sea party, which would lay down depots on the route of the Transcontinental party and go south to assist that party. The Transcontinental party would take magnetic and meteorological observations during the journey. Other parties of the expedition would be engaged in scientific work, studying the geology and meteorological conditions; the ships would be equipped for hydrographic work.

The book describes the progress of the Endurance through pack ice in the Weddell Sea; the ship was eventually held in pack ice and drifted with it. The ship was crushed and sank. The party camped on the ice which drifted north; when the ice no longer supported them they took to the three boats from the ship and made for Elephant Island. Shackleton and five others, in one of the boats, the James Caird, made the sea journey to South Georgia, where Shackleton and two others crossed the mountainous interior of the island to reach the whaling station and summon help. The men still on Elephant Island were rescued by Captain Luis Pardo, commanding the Chilean Navy's Yelcho, a small steamer lent to Shackleton by the Chilean government.

The experiences of the Ross Sea party are then described. Ernest Joyce's diary is quoted for the description of laying depots, during which Arnold Spencer-Smith died from exhaustion; after depot-laying was done, Aeneas Mackintosh and Victor Hayward died, falling through ice attempting to walk to their base at Cape Evans. The log of Joseph Stenhouse, first officer of the Aurora, is quoted for the description of the drift of the ship for several months in pack ice, unable to manoeuvre, after it broke away from moorings at Cape Evans.

The last chapter describes the subsequent involvement of the expedition members in the First World War; three were killed and five wounded.

Appendix I, "Scientific Work", consists of articles by members of the expedition who were scientists: "Sea-ice nomenclature" by James Wordie, "Meteorology" by Leonard Hussey, "Physics" by Reginald W. James and "South Atlantic Whales and Whaling" by Robert Selbie Clark. Appendix II, "The expedition huts at McMurdo Sound", by Shackleton, describes the huts known to him, for the benefit of future Antarctic explorers: (1) The National Antarctic Expedition's hut at Hut Point; (2) Cape Royds Hut; (3) Cape Evans Hut; (4) Depots south of Hut Point.

== See also ==
- Endurance: Shackleton's Incredible Voyage
- The Endurance: Shackleton's Legendary Antarctic Expedition

== Cited sources ==
- Huntford, Roland (1985). Shackleton. London: Hodder & Stoughton. OCLC 13108800.
