= Mrs Chippy =

Cat who accompanied Sir Ernest Shackleton's Imperial Trans-Antarctic Expedition

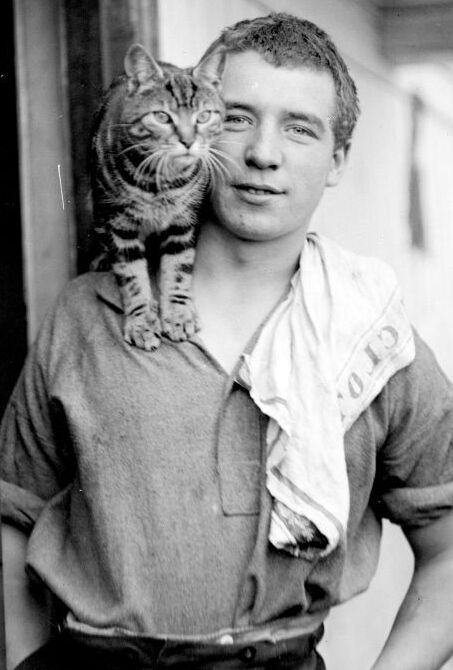
- Mrs Chippy on the shoulder of crew member Perce Blackborow
- Species: Cat
- Breed: Felis catus
- Sex: male
- Died: 29 October 1915; Antarctica
- Years active: 1914–1915
- Owner: Harry McNish
- Appearance: Mackerel tabby

Mrs Chippy was a male ship's cat who accompanied Sir Ernest Shackleton's Imperial Trans-Antarctic Expedition of 1914–1917.

== Life ==
Mrs Chippy, a tiger-striped tabby, was taken on board the ship used by the expedition's Weddell Sea party, Endurance, as a ship's cat by carpenter and master shipwright Harry "Chippy" McNish ("Chippy" being a colloquial British term for a carpenter). The cat acquired its name because, once aboard, it followed McNish around like an overly attentive wife.

One month after the ship set sail for Antarctica it was discovered that, despite its name, Mrs Chippy was actually a male. By that time, however, the name had stuck. He was described as "full of character" by members of the expedition and impressed the crew with his ability to walk along the ship's inch-wide rails in even the roughest seas. In Captain Frank Worsley’s diary he describes Mrs Chippy climbing the rigging "... exactly after the manner of a seaman going aloft".

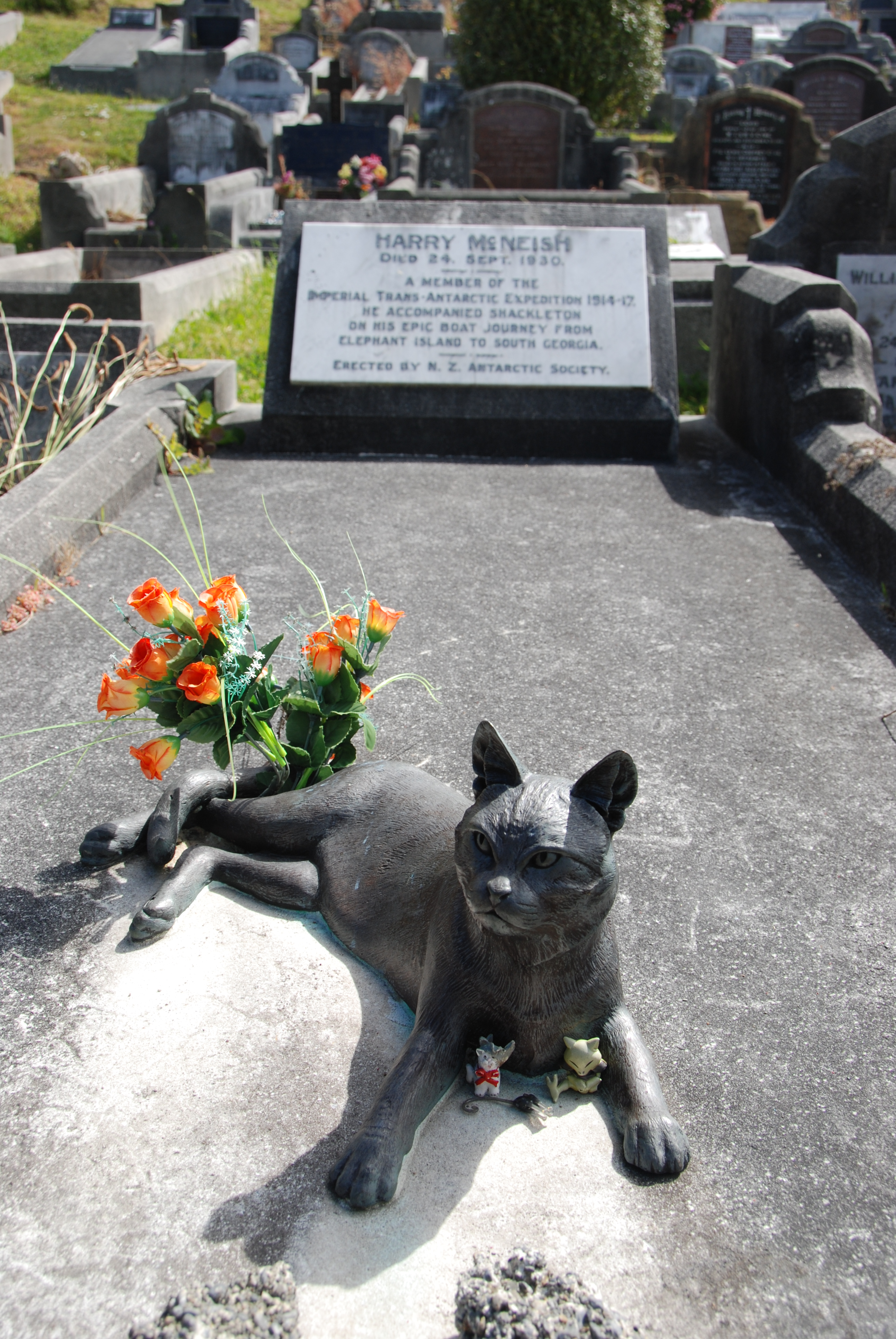
Bronze sculpture of Mrs Chippy on the grave of Harry McNish in Karori Cemetery which was added by the New Zealand Antarctic Society

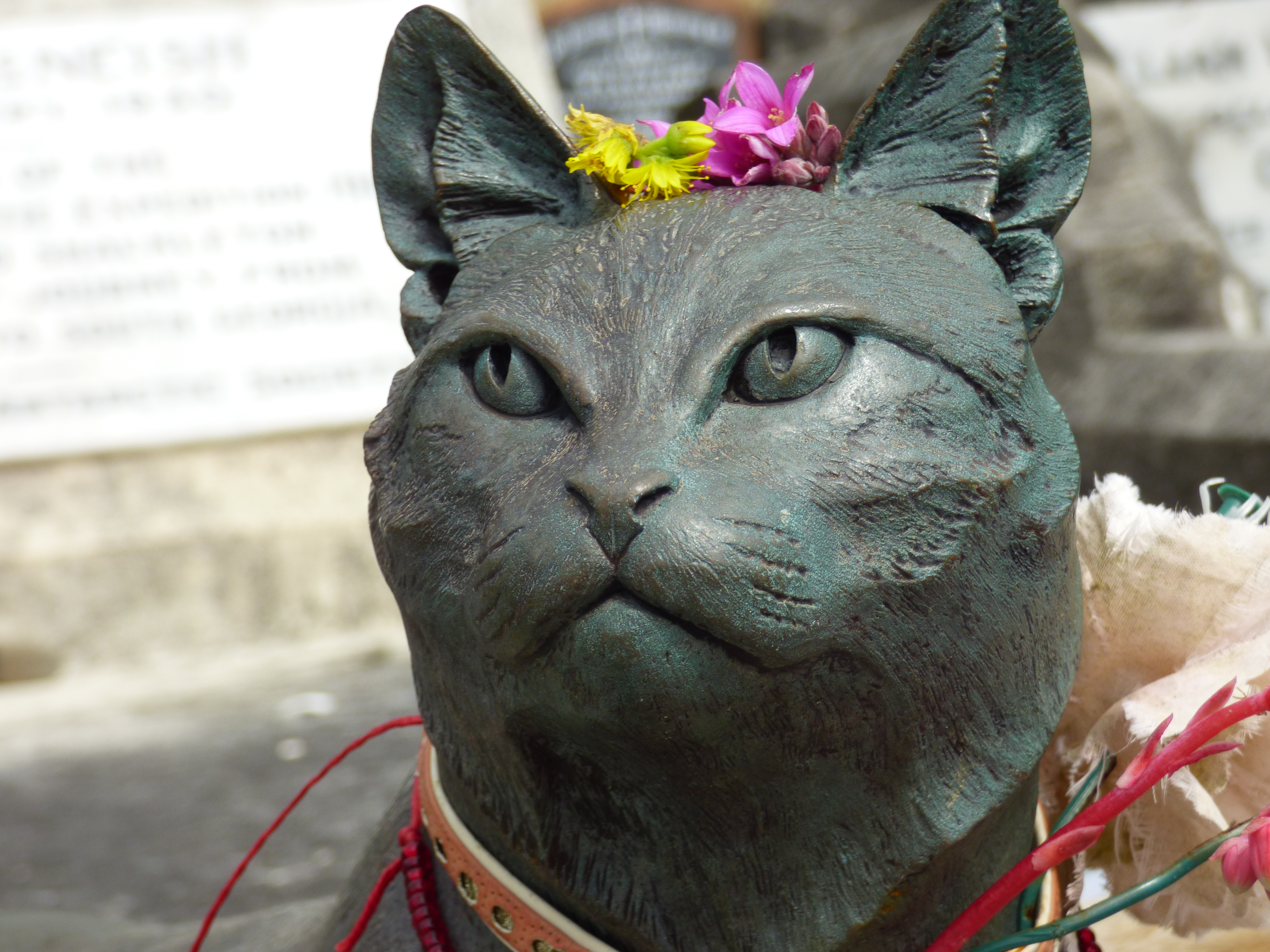
Close up photo of the sculpture of Mrs Chippy in Karori Cemetery

Mrs Chippy's voyage was not without incident. Storekeeper Thomas Orde-Lees, in a diary entry dated 13 September 1914, relates that "An extraordinary thing happened during the night. The tabby cat jumped overboard through one of the cabin portholes and the officer on watch, Lt. Hudson, heard her screams and turned the ship smartly round & picked her up. She must have been in the water 10 minutes or more". The cat was retrieved by the ship's biologist, Robert Clark, using one of his sample nets.

After the Endurance became trapped in pack ice and was destroyed, Shackleton decided that Mrs Chippy and four of the sled dogs that had been carried on board would not survive. In a diary entry dated 29 October 1915 he recorded:

This afternoon Sallie's three youngest pups, Sue's Sirius, and Mrs. Chippy, the carpenter's cat, have to be shot. We could not undertake the maintenance of weaklings under the new conditions. Macklin, Crean, and the carpenter seemed to feel the loss of their friends rather badly.

McNish was very attached to Mrs Chippy and never forgave Shackleton for having him killed.

== Legacy ==
McNish died, destitute, in Wellington, New Zealand, in September 1930, and was buried with full naval honours in an unmarked grave in Karori Cemetery. The New Zealand Antarctic Society placed a headstone on the grave in 1959. In 2004 a life-size bronze statue of Mrs Chippy, funded through public subscription, was added as a tribute and memorial to the carpenter and his much-loved cat.

In February 2011, Mrs Chippy and expedition member Perce Blackborow were featured on a postage stamp issued by the South Georgia and the South Sandwich Islands.

== Cultural references ==
A novel by Caroline Alexander, Mrs. Chippy's Last Expedition: The Remarkable Journal of Shackleton's Polar-Bound Cat, was published by Bloomsbury in 1997. The book provides an account of Shackleton's Imperial Trans-Antarctic Expedition, covering the period 15 January 1914 to 29 October 1915, in the form of a journal written from Mrs. Chippy's point of view. The final entry recounts Shackleton instructing his crew, now camped on the ice pack following the destruction of their ship, that to ensure their survival "Anything that cannot pull its weight or is not useful to the Expedition must be put down". The book ends poignantly with Mrs Chippy (clearly unaware of the implications of Shackleton's order) relaxing in a tent, reminiscing over past adventures and, after being given a treat of a bowl of sardines, looking forward to assisting with the rest of the expedition.

Mrs Chippy was portrayed in the 2002 Channel 4 mini-series Shackleton, starring Kenneth Branagh, with the credits stating that the part was played by 'Mac'.

The painting Mrs Chippy by Wolf Howard shows the cat "about to be shot", while in the background Endurance is depicted trapped in the ice and its crew can be seen launching a small open boat on a rescue mission. The painting was shown in The Stuckists Punk Victorian exhibition at the Walker Art Gallery during the 2004 Liverpool Biennial.

Kate Atkinson’s novel Case Histories (2004) features a cat named Mrs. Chippy “after the cat on board Shackleton’s ship Endurance.”

An opera for primary school children, Shackleton's Cat by Russell Hepplewhite, was commissioned by the English Touring Opera in 2015. A picture book titled Mrs Chippy the Cat by Susan Brocker and Raymond McGrath was published by Scholastic New Zealand in 2021.

== See also ==
- List of individual cats
