= Thomas McLeod =

Thomas McLeod may refer to:

- Thomas Gordon McLeod (1868–1932), governor of South Carolina
- Thomas McLeod (sailor) (1873–1960), Scottish sailor
