= Robert Clark (zoologist) =

Scottish marine zoologist and polar explorer (1882–1950)

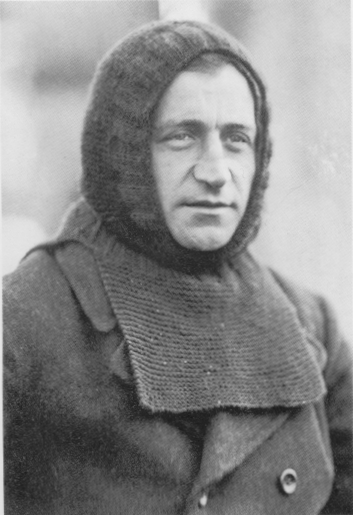
Robert Clark during Endurance

Dr Robert Selbie Clark FRSE (11 September 1882 – 29 September 1950) was a Scottish marine zoologist and explorer. He was the biologist on Sir Ernest Shackleton's Imperial Trans-Antarctic Expedition of 1914–1917, and served as the director of the Scottish Home Department Marine Laboratory, at Torry, Aberdeen.

== Early life ==
Robert Clark was born on 11 September 1882 in Aberdeen, the son of William Clark. He attended Aberdeen Grammar School and then Aberdeen University from where he graduated with an M.A. in 1908. In 1911 he attained a BSc and became Zoologist to the Scottish Oceanographical Laboratory, Edinburgh, a post he held until he was appointed naturalist to the Marine Biological Association in 1913. While at the Scottish Oceanographical Laboratory, he worked on some of the Antarctic specimens that William Speirs Bruce had brought back from the Scottish National Antarctic Expedition of 1902–04.

He was a natural sportsman, a keen golfer and angler, and was selected to play cricket for Scotland in 1912. He had a reserved manner, not given to laughing or joking, but with a strong work ethic and a passion for biology.

== Imperial Trans-Antarctic Expedition ==
On 9 August 1914 the Endurance departed Plymouth, carrying Shackleton and his crew on what was intended to be the first expedition to cross Antarctica from the Atlantic to the Pacific via the South Pole. Over 5000 applications for places in the crew had been received. The expedition was a failure: the ship became trapped in pack ice and was eventually destroyed by the pressure of the ice, but all the crew of the Endurance were eventually rescued after Shackleton and five men made an 800-mile sea journey to fetch help. Clark was a hard worker, and, despite his dour manner, quickly won the respect of the crew with his willingness to volunteer for some of the more arduous or unpleasant jobs aboard ship, although he was the butt of several jokes. He was not the politest of men, and a little verse was composed around his apparent inability to remember to say "please". The crew boiled some spaghetti and placed it in one of his collecting jars, causing him momentary excitement at the thought of having discovered a new species, and a standing joke claimed the penguins seen alongside were said to shout out "Clark, Clark" and chase after the ship whenever he was at the wheel. He worked arduously at his biological recording from the moment the expeditions set out, recording the specimens encountered using dredging nets as the ship progressed southwards. When the ship became trapped in the ice he continued with his work, dissecting penguins and recording the changes in the plankton levels in sea.

When the ship had to be abandoned all Clark's specimens were left behind. Frank Worsley recorded:

I felt sorry for Clark, as I lay there that night and realised that he had been obliged to leave on the Endurance the whole of his valuable collection that he had been at such pains to classify and study.

Once they reached the edge of the pack ice the crew set out for Elephant Island in three of the small boats of the Endurance. Clark travelled in the 22½-foot James Caird with Shackleton, Frank Hurley, Leonard Hussey, Reginald James, James Wordie, Harry McNish, Charles Green, John Vincent and Timothy McCarthy. On arriving at the island, Shackleton set out almost immediately with five of the crew to fetch rescue from South Georgia. The rest of the men, Clark among them, stayed camped on the island with Frank Wild in command. Elephant Island was inhospitable. It was cold but humid which meant that neither the clothing nor the sleeping bags were ever completely dry. Though there were penguins and seals to eat, the supplies were not inexhaustible and fuel was scarce. The routine on the island was monotonous. Clark managed to produce a primitive alcoholic beverage from methylated spirit, sugar, water and ginger which became known as "Gut Rot 1916" and was drunk with a toast to "Wives and Sweethearts" on Saturdays. On 30 August 1916, the men on Elephant Island were rescued by Shackleton aboard the Chilean ship Yelcho, four months after he had left the island.

== After the expedition ==
Clark returned to Scotland where he married Christine Ferguson. He served as a Lieutenant on minesweepers in the Royal Naval Volunteer Reserve during World War I and then returned to Plymouth in 1919 when the war finished. His cricketing skills led to his again being selected for Scotland in 1924. In 1925 he gained a D.Sc. (Doctor of Science), and in the same year he became the director of the Fisheries Research Laboratory in Torry, Aberdeen. In 1934, he was appointed Superintendent of Scientific Investigations under the Fishery Board for Scotland. He contributed papers on herring larvae and haddock stocks.

In 1935 he was elected a Fellow of the Royal Society of Edinburgh. His proposers were Sir D'Arcy Wentworth Thompson, Sir John Graham Kerr and James Hartley Ashworth.

He retired in 1948 and died two years later at home in Murtle, Aberdeenshire; he had no children.
