= Alexander Kerr =

British engineer (1892–1964)

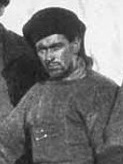
Alexander Kerr as a member of the Elephant Island party

Alexander John Henry Kerr (2 December 1892 – 4 December 1964) was an English marine engineer and wholesale newsagent. He is best known for his service in the Imperial Trans-Antarctic Expedition of 1914–1916, for which he was awarded the Silver Polar Medal.

== Biography ==
Kerr was born on 2 December 1892 in East Ham, which was then part of Essex but has since become part of Greater London. As a man trained for work with marine engines, he signed on the Endurance as the second engineer. Although the Endurance was rigged as a barquentine, it also had a coal-burning engine and spent much of its time under steam.

Working under the supervision of chief engineer Lewis Rickinson, who became Kerr's friend and cabin-mate, Kerr tried to help power the Endurance to the destination selected by the expedition leader, Sir Ernest Shackleton. Their goal was the Filchner Ice Shelf attached to the continent of Antarctica. To get to this goal the Endurance, her crew, and her shore party had to make their way through the ice-filled Weddell Sea. Instead of reaching the ice shelf, the expedition ship was beset by pack ice as the Antarctic winter of 1915 closed in. Conditions worsened during the winter and Shackleton was forced to order his men to abandon the Endurance in November 1915. Kerr and his expedition mates were castaways on the Weddell Sea. With Rickinson and his other comrades, Kerr camped on ice floes that drifted north towards the Drake Passage and into warmer water. As their solid refuge melted under their feet, Kerr and the other men of the expedition were then forced to take to lifeboats. After a dangerous open-boat journey, the party made land at Elephant Island off the coast of the Antarctic Peninsula. The Elephant Island party was rescued in August 1916.

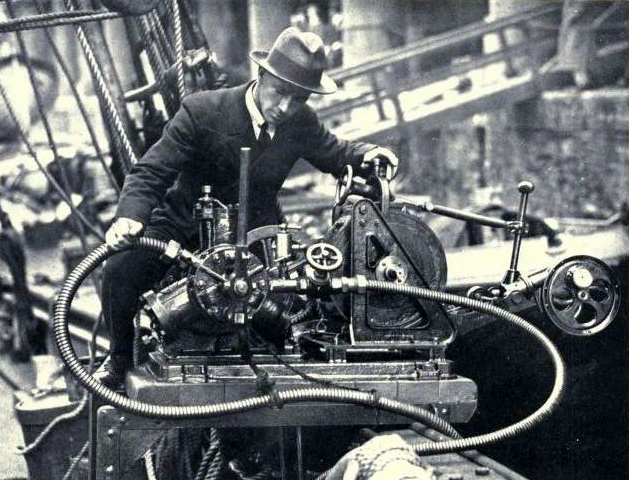
Alexander Kerr examines the Lucas deep-sea sounding machine aboard the Quest

Upon returning to Britain, Kerr joined the Royal Navy and served on mine-sweepers during the second half of World War I. With his polar experience, he was assigned to the North Russia intervention, an abortive attempt by the United Kingdom and other Western Powers to provide support for non-tsarist, non-communist forces in revolutionary Russia. Kerr retained his ties with Shackleton while serving in Russian waters; and when the veteran explorer announced plans for one more Antarctic expedition in 1921, Kerr signed articles to serve aboard the Quest, this time as chief engineer. The Quest expedition proved tragically abortive when Shackleton died in South Georgia in January 1922. With the end of what is called the Heroic Age of Antarctic Exploration, Kerr returned to London for good. He resumed life as a civilian engineer, specializing in the power units of tugboats in the Port of London.

In 1917, Kerr had married Lillian Mitchell. Two children, son Jack Kerr (1918) and daughter Eileen Kerr (1920), completed their family. In 1934, now middle-aged, Kerr again shifted careers and built a new life as a wholesaler to small shops. His Ilford-based firm distributed confections, tobacco, and newspapers to newsagents and tobacconists. Kerr died, age 72, in hospital in Stepney on 4 December 1964, thus maintaining his ties with East London until his death.

== Legacy ==
In 1916–17, Kerr was awarded the Polar Medal in silver.
