= Imperial Trans-Antarctic Expedition =

1914–17 British Expedition led by Sir Ernest Shackleton

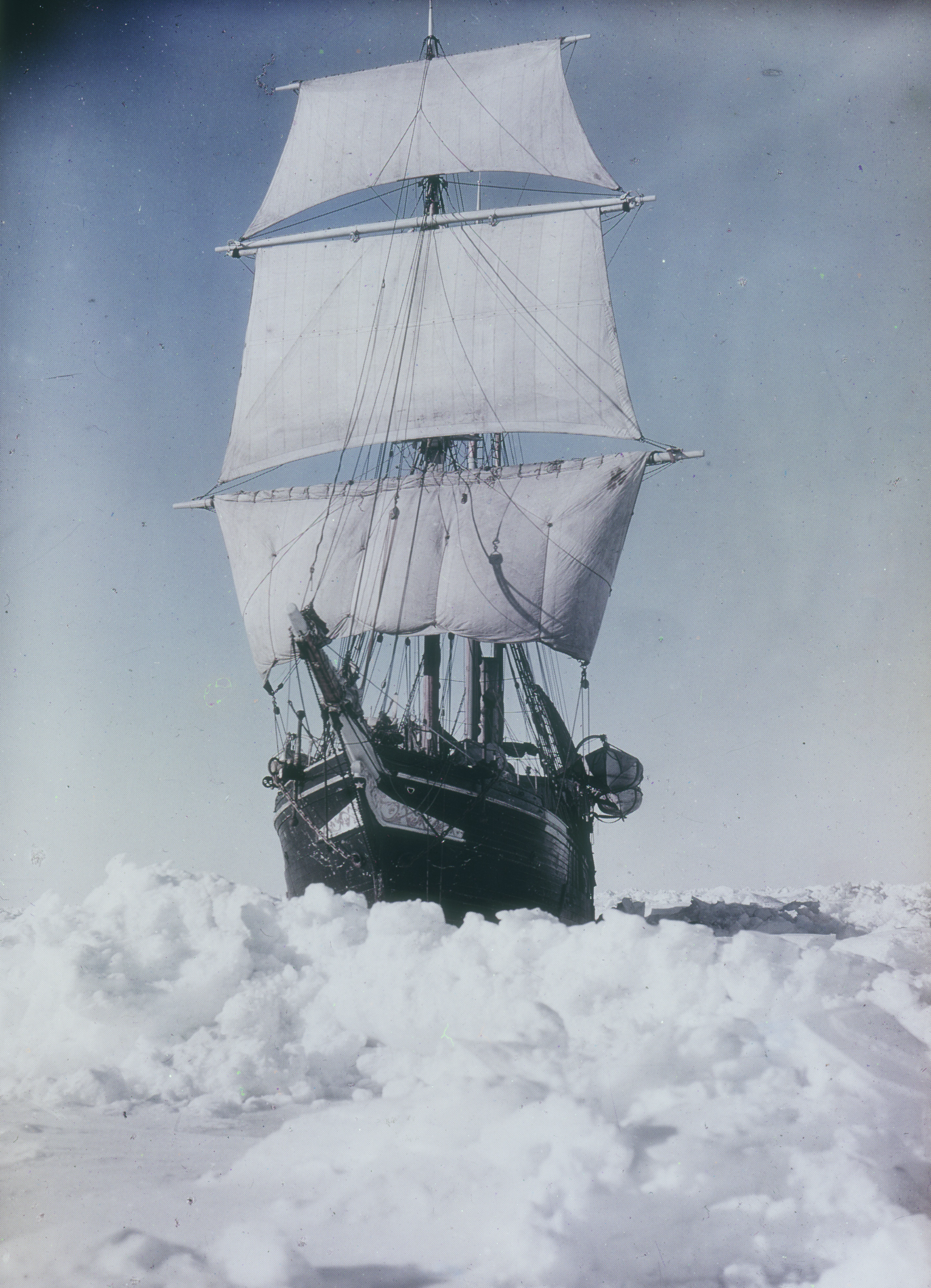
Endurance under sail, Antarctic Ocean, c. 1915 Paget colour photograph by Frank Hurley

The Imperial Trans-Antarctic Expedition (abbreviated as ITAE) of 1914–1917 is considered to be the last major expedition of the Heroic Age of Antarctic Exploration. Conceived by Sir Ernest Shackleton, the expedition was an attempt to make the first land crossing of the Antarctic continent. After Roald Amundsen's South Pole expedition in 1911, this crossing remained, in Shackleton's words, the "one great main object of Antarctic journeyings". Shackleton's expedition failed to accomplish this objective but became recognised instead as an epic feat of endurance.

Shackleton had served in the Antarctic on the Discovery Expedition of 1901–1904 and had led the Nimrod Expedition of 1907–1909. In this new venture, he proposed to sail to the Weddell Sea and to land a shore party near Vahsel Bay, in preparation for a transcontinental march via the South Pole to the Ross Sea. A supporting group, the Ross Sea party, would meanwhile establish camp in McMurdo Sound and from there lay a series of supply depots across the Ross Ice Shelf to the foot of the Beardmore Glacier. These depots would be essential for the transcontinental party's survival, as the group would not be able to carry enough provisions for the entire crossing. The expedition required two ships: Endurance under Shackleton for the Weddell Sea party, and Aurora, under Aeneas Mackintosh, for the Ross Sea party.

Endurance became beset—trapped in the ice of the Weddell Sea—before it was able to reach Vahsel Bay. It drifted northward, held in the pack ice, throughout the Antarctic winter of 1915. Eventually the ice crushed the ship, and it sank, stranding its complement of 28 men on the ice. After months spent in makeshift camps as the ice continued its northwards drift, the party used lifeboats that had been salvaged from the ship to reach the inhospitable, uninhabited Elephant Island. Shackleton and five other members of the group then made an 800-mile (1,300 km) open-boat journey in the James Caird, and were able to reach South Georgia. From there, Shackleton was eventually able to arrange a rescue of the men who had remained on Elephant Island and to bring them home without loss of life. The remarkably preserved wreck of Endurance was found on the seafloor in 2022.

On the other side of the continent, the Ross Sea party overcame great hardships to fulfill its mission. Aurora was blown from her moorings during a gale and was unable to return, leaving the shore party stranded without proper supplies or equipment. Although the depots were still able to be laid, three people died before the party was eventually rescued.

== Preparations ==
=== Origin ===
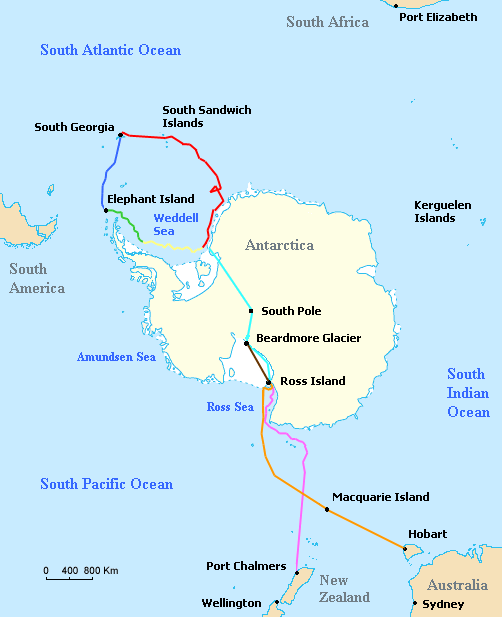
Voyage of the Endurance Drift of the Endurance in pack ice Sea ice drift after the Endurance sinks Voyage of the James Caird Planned trans-Antarctic route Voyage of the Aurora to Antarctica Retreat of the Aurora Supply depot route

Despite the public acclaim that had greeted Ernest Shackleton's achievements after the Nimrod Expedition in 1907–1909, the explorer was unsettled, becoming—in the words of British skiing pioneer Sir Harry Brittain—"a bit of a floating gent". By 1912, his future Antarctic plans depended on the results of Robert Falcon Scott's Terra Nova Expedition, which had left Cardiff in July 1910, and on the concurrent Norwegian expedition led by Roald Amundsen. The news of Amundsen's conquest of the South Pole reached Shackleton on 11 March 1912, to which he responded: "The discovery of the South Pole will not be the end of Antarctic exploration". The next work, he said, would be "a transcontinental journey from sea to sea, crossing the pole". He was aware that others were in the field pursuing this objective.

On 11 December 1911, a German expedition under Wilhelm Filchner had sailed from South Georgia, intending to penetrate deep into the Weddell Sea and establishing a base from which he would cross the continent to the Ross Sea. In late 1912 Filchner returned to South Georgia, having failed to land and set up his base. However, his reports of possible landing sites in Vahsel Bay, at around 78° latitude, were noted by Shackleton, and incorporated into his developing expedition plans.

News of the deaths of Scott and his companions on their return from the South Pole reached London in February 1913. Against this gloomy background Shackleton initiated preparations for his proposed journey. He solicited financial and practical support from, among others, Tryggve Gran of Scott's expedition, and the former prime minister, Lord Rosebery, but received no help from either. Gran was evasive, and Rosebery blunt: "I have never been able to care one farthing about the Poles".

Shackleton got support, however, from William Speirs Bruce, leader of the Scottish National Antarctic Expedition of 1902–1904, who had harboured plans for an Antarctic crossing since 1908 but had abandoned the project for lack of funds. Bruce generously allowed Shackleton to adopt his plans, although the eventual scheme announced by Shackleton owed little to Bruce. On 29 December 1913, having acquired his first promises of financial backing—a £10,000 grant from the British government—Shackleton made his plans public in a letter to The Times.

=== Shackleton's plan ===
Shackleton called his new expedition the Imperial Trans-Antarctic Expedition, because he felt that "not only the people of these islands, but our kinsmen in all the lands under the Union Jack will be willing to assist towards the carrying out of the ... programme of exploration." To arouse the interest of the general public, he issued a detailed programme early in 1914. The expedition was to consist of two parties and two ships. The Weddell Sea party would travel aboard Endurance and continue to the Vahsel Bay area, where 14 men would land, of whom six, under Shackleton, would form the transcontinental party. This group, with 69 dogs, two motor sledges, and equipment "embodying everything that the experience of the leader and his expert advisers can suggest", would undertake the 1,800-mile (2,900 km) journey to the Ross Sea. The remaining eight shore party members would carry out scientific work, three going to Graham Land, three to Enderby Land and two remaining at base camp.

The Ross Sea party would set up its base in McMurdo Sound, on the opposite side of the continent. After landing they would lay depots on the route of the transcontinental party as far as the Beardmore Glacier, hopefully meeting that party there and assisting it home. They would also make geological and other observations.

=== Finances ===
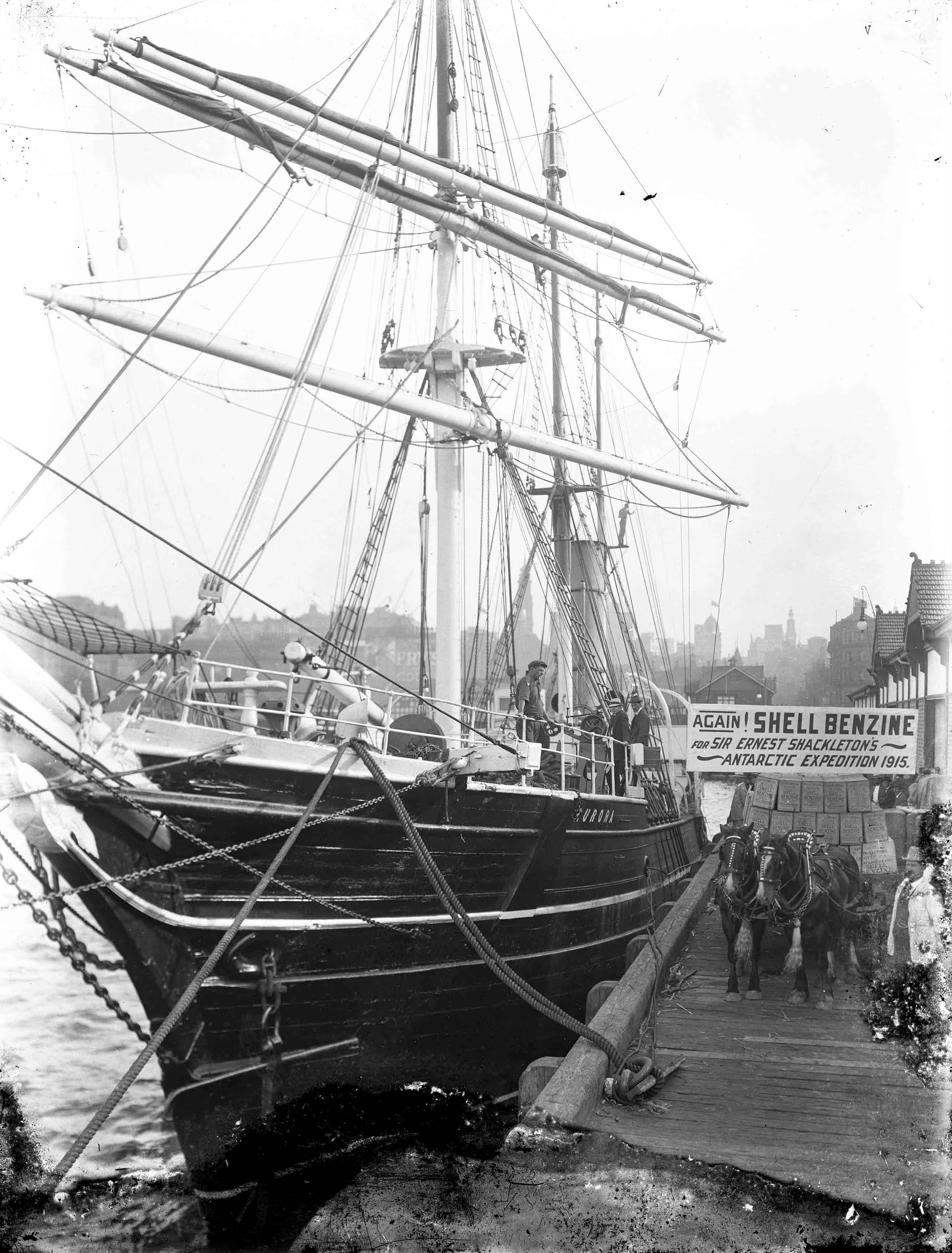
Corporate sponsorship for the expedition; Aurora is loaded with paraffin provided by Shell.

Shackleton estimated that he would need £50,000 (current value £4,988,000) to carry out the simplest version of his plan. He did not believe in appeals to the public: "(they) cause endless book-keeping worries". His chosen method of fundraising was to solicit contributions from wealthy backers, and he had begun this process early in 1913 with little initial success. The first significant encouragement came in December 1913, when the British government offered him £10,000, provided he could raise an equivalent amount from private sources. The Royal Geographical Society (RGS), from which he had expected nothing, gave him £1,000—according to Huntford, Shackleton, in a grand gesture, advised them that he would only need to take up half of this sum. Lord Rosebery, who had previously expressed his lack of interest in polar expeditions, gave £50.

In February 1914, The New York Times reported that playwright J. M. Barrie—a close friend of Scott, who had become Shackleton's rival late in his career—had confidentially donated $50,000 (about £10,000). With time running out, contributions were eventually secured during the first half of 1914. Dudley Docker of the Birmingham Small Arms Company gave £10,000, wealthy tobacco heiress Janet Stancomb-Wills gave a "generous" sum (the amount was not revealed), and, in June, Scottish industrialist Sir James Key Caird donated £24,000 (current value £2,390,000). Shackleton informed the Morning Post that "this magnificent gift relieves me of all anxiety".

Shackleton now had the money to proceed. He acquired, for £14,000 (current value £1,400,000), a 300-ton barquentine called Polaris, which had been built for the Belgian explorer Adrien de Gerlache for an expedition to Spitsbergen. This scheme had collapsed and the ship became available. Shackleton changed her name to Endurance, reflecting his family motto, "By endurance we conquer". For a further £3,200 (current value £319,000), he acquired Douglas Mawson's expedition ship Aurora, which was lying in Hobart, Tasmania. This would act as the Ross Sea party's vessel.

How much money Shackleton raised to meet the total costs of the expedition (later estimated by the Daily Mail to be around £80,000) is uncertain, since the size of the Stancomb-Wills donation is not known. Money was a constant problem for Shackleton, who as an economy measure halved the funding allocated to the Ross Sea party, a fact which the party's commander Aeneas Mackintosh only discovered when he arrived in Australia to take up his duties. Mackintosh was forced to haggle and plead for money and supplies to make his part of the expedition viable. Shackleton had, however, realised the revenue-earning potential of the expedition. He sold the exclusive newspaper rights to the Daily Chronicle, and formed the Imperial Trans Antarctic Film Syndicate to take advantage of the film rights.

== Personnel ==
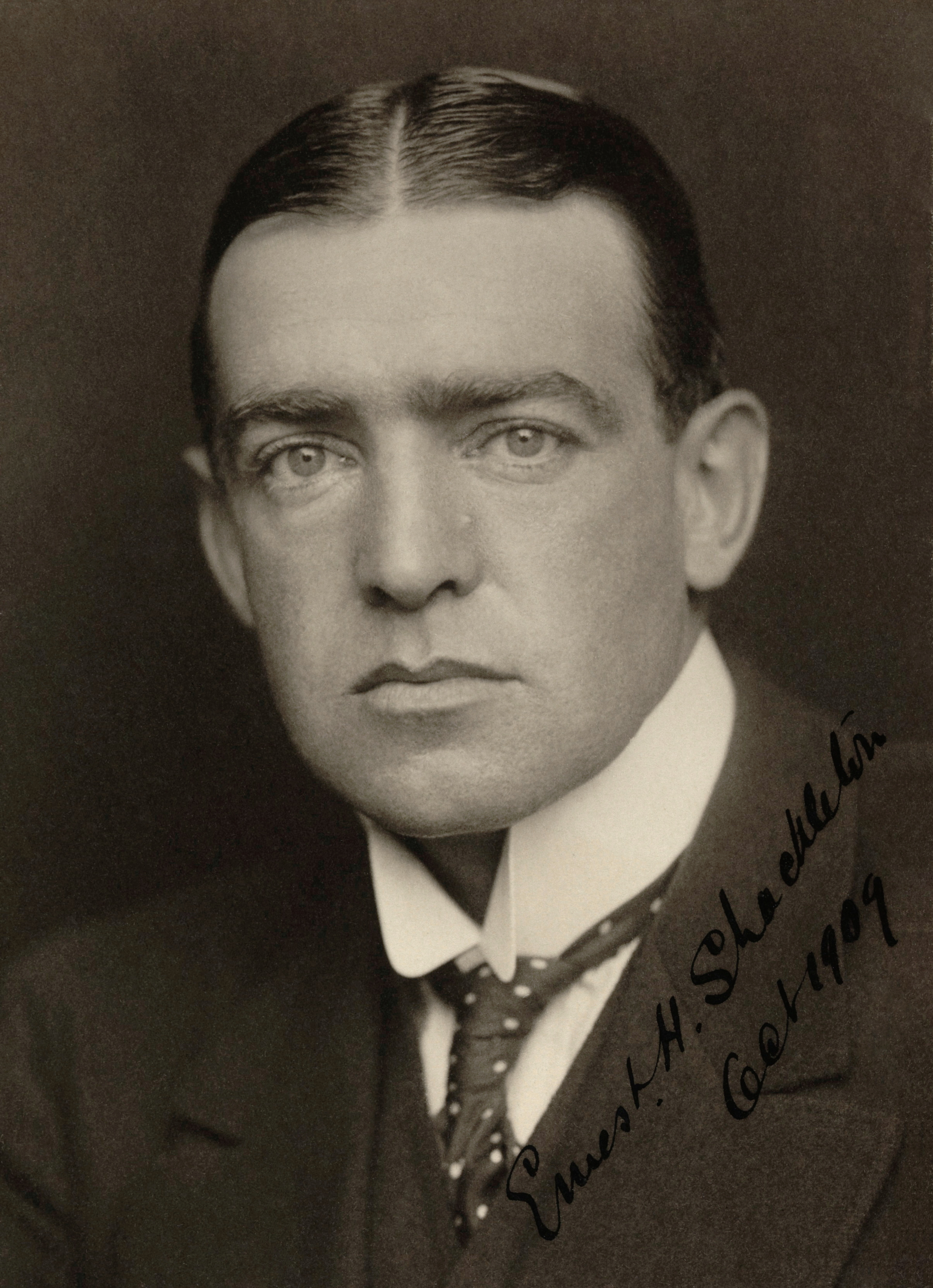
Ernest Shackleton, leader of the Imperial Trans-Antarctic Expedition

According to legend, Shackleton posted an advertisement in a London paper, stating: "Men wanted for hazardous journey. Low wages, bitter cold, long hours of complete darkness. Safe return doubtful. Honour and recognition in event of success." Searches for the original advertisement have proved unsuccessful, and the story is generally regarded as apocryphal. Shackleton received more than 5,000 applications for places on the expedition, including a letter from "three sporty girls" who suggested that if their feminine garb was inconvenient they would "just love to don masculine attire."

Eventually the crews for the two arms of the expedition were trimmed down to 28 apiece, including William Bakewell, who joined the ship in Buenos Aires; his friend Perce Blackborow, who stowed away when his application was turned down; and several last-minute appointments made to the Ross Sea party in Australia. A temporary crewman was Sir Daniel Gooch, grandson of the railway pioneer Daniel Gooch, who stepped in to help Shackleton as a dog handler at the last moment and signed up for an able seaman's pay. Gooch agreed to sail with Endurance as far as South Georgia.

As his second-in-command, Shackleton chose Frank Wild, who had been with him on both the Discovery and Nimrod expeditions, and was one of the Farthest South party in 1909. Wild had just returned from Mawson's Australasian Antarctic Expedition. To captain Endurance Shackleton had wanted John King Davis, who had commanded Aurora during the Australasian Antarctic Expedition. Davis refused, thinking the enterprise was "foredoomed", so the appointment went to Frank Worsley, who claimed to have applied to the expedition after learning of it in a dream. Tom Crean, who had been awarded the Albert Medal for saving the life of Lieutenant Edward Evans on the Terra Nova Expedition, took leave from the Royal Navy to sign on as Endurance's second officer; another experienced Antarctic hand, Alfred Cheetham, became third officer. Two Nimrod veterans were assigned to the Ross Sea party: Mackintosh, who commanded it, and Ernest Joyce. Shackleton had hoped that Aurora would be staffed by a naval crew, and had asked the Admiralty for officers and men, but was turned down. After pressing his case, Shackleton was given one officer from the Royal Marines, Captain Thomas Orde-Lees, who was superintendent of physical training at the marines' training depot.

The scientific staff of six accompanying Endurance comprised the two surgeons, Alexander Macklin and James McIlroy; a geologist, James Wordie; a biologist, Robert Clark; a physicist, Reginald W. James; and Leonard Hussey, a meteorologist who would eventually edit Shackleton's expedition account South. The visual record of the expedition was the responsibility of its photographer Frank Hurley and its artist George Marston. The final composition of the Ross Sea party was hurried. Some who left Britain for Australia to join Aurora resigned before it departed for the Ross Sea, and a full complement of crew was in doubt until the last minute. Within the party only Mackintosh and Joyce had any previous Antarctic experience; Mackintosh had lost an eye as the result of an accident during the Nimrod expedition and had gone home early.

== Expedition ==
=== Weddell Sea party ===
==== Voyage through the ice ====
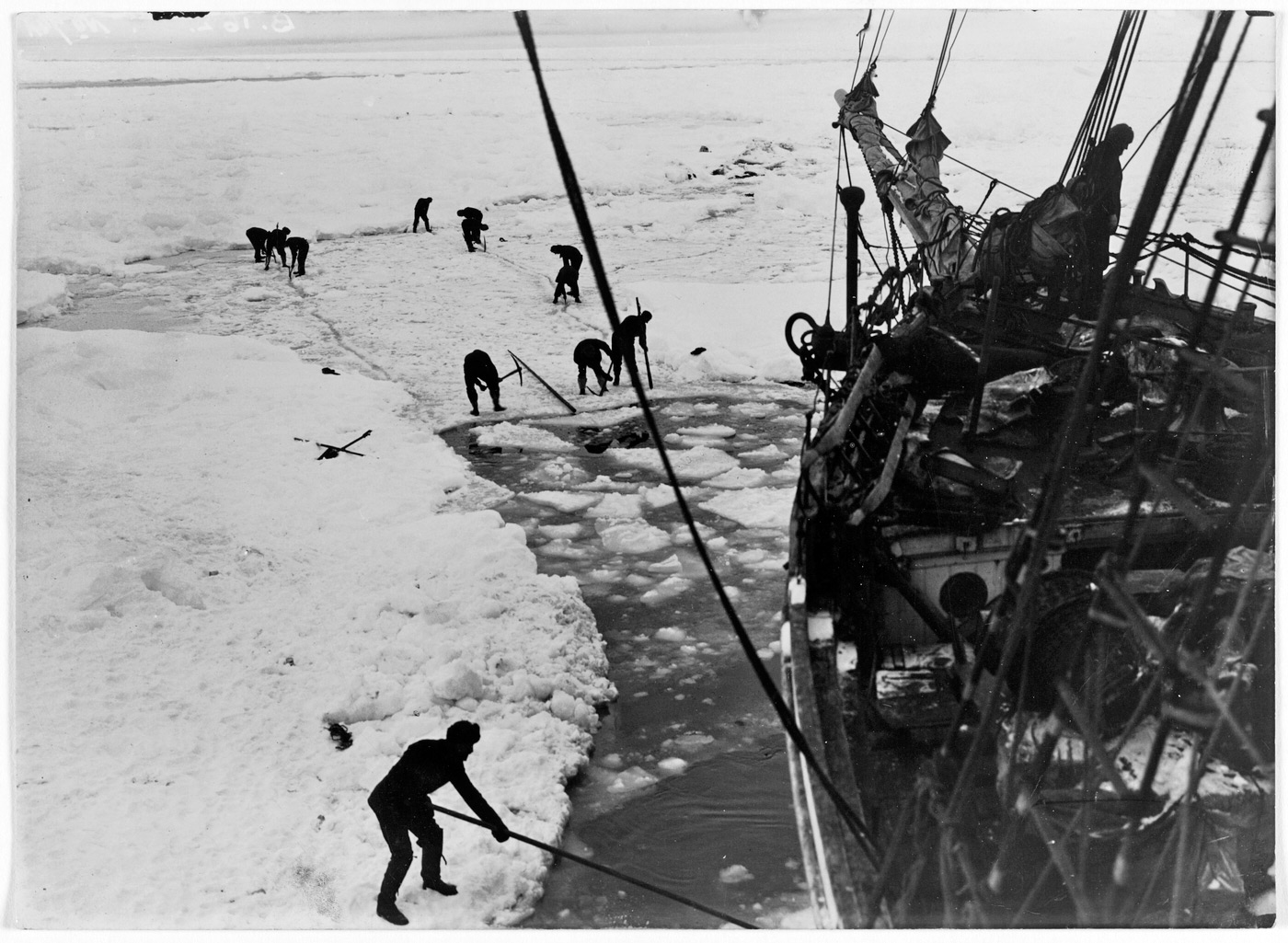
Crew members working to free the ship from the ice

Endurance, without Shackleton (who was detained in England by expedition business), left Plymouth on 8 August 1914, heading first for Buenos Aires. Here Shackleton, who had travelled on a faster ship, rejoined the expedition. Hurley also came on board, together with Bakewell and the stowaway, Blackborow, while several others left the ship or were discharged. On 26 October, the ship sailed for the South Atlantic, arriving in South Georgia on 5 November. Shackleton's original intention was that the crossing would take place in the first season, 1914–1915. Although he soon recognised the impracticality of this, he neglected to inform Mackintosh and the Ross Sea party of his change of plan. According to the Daily Chronicle's correspondent Ernest Perris, a cable intended for Mackintosh was never sent.

After a month-long halt in the Grytviken whaling station on South Georgia, Endurance departed for the Antarctic on 5 December. Two days later, Shackleton was disconcerted to encounter pack ice as far north as 57° 26′S, forcing the ship to manoeuvre. During the following days there were more tussles with the pack, which, on 14 December, was thick enough to halt the ship for 24 hours. Three days later, the ship was stopped again. Shackleton commented: "I had been prepared for evil conditions in the Weddell Sea, but had hoped that the pack would be loose. What we were encountering was fairly dense pack of a very obstinate character".

Endurance's progress was frustratingly slow, until, on 22 December, leads opened up and the ship was able to continue steadily southward. This continued for the next two weeks, taking the party deep into the Weddell Sea. Further delays then slowed progress after the turn of the year, before a lengthy run south during 7–10 January 1915 brought them close to the 100-foot (30 m) ice walls which guarded the Antarctic coastal region of Coats Land. This territory had been discovered and named by William Speirs Bruce in 1904 during the Scottish National Antarctic Expedition. On 15 January, Endurance came abreast of a great glacier, the edge of which formed a bay which appeared a good landing place. However, Shackleton considered it too far north of Vahsel Bay for a landing, "except under pressure of necessity"—a decision he would later regret. On 17 January, the ship reached a latitude of 76° 27′S, where land was faintly discernible. Shackleton named it Caird Coast, after his principal backer. Bad weather forced the ship to shelter in the lee of a stranded iceberg.

Endurance was now close to Luitpold Land, discovered by Filchner in 1912, at the southern end of which lay their destination, Vahsel Bay. Next day, the ship was forced north-westward for 14 miles (23 km), resuming in a generally southerly direction before being stopped altogether. The position was 76° 34′S, 31° 30′W. After ten days of inactivity, Endurance's fires were banked to save fuel. Strenuous efforts were made to release her; on 14 February, Shackleton ordered men onto the ice with ice-chisels, prickers, saws and picks to try to force a passage, but the labour proved futile. Shackleton did not at this stage abandon all hope of breaking free, but was now contemplating the "possibility of having to spend a winter in the inhospitable arms of the pack".

==== Drift of Endurance ====
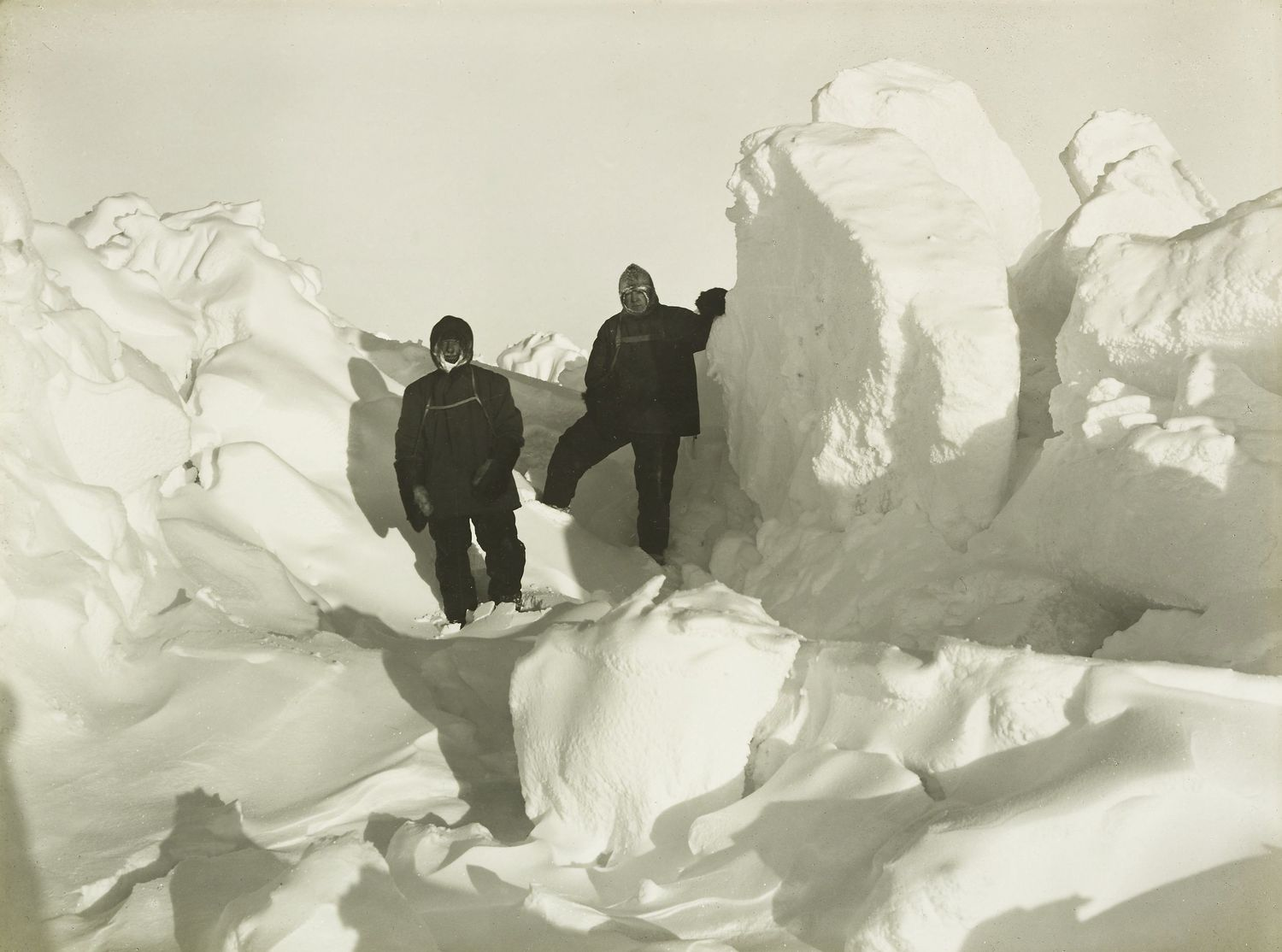
Shackleton and Wild among the pressure ridges in the pack ice

On 22 February 1915, Endurance, still held fast, drifted to her most southerly latitude, 76° 58′S. Thereafter she began moving with the pack in a northerly direction. On 24 February, Shackleton realised that they would be held in the ice throughout the winter and ordered ship's routine abandoned. The dogs were taken off board and housed in ice-kennels or "dogloos", and the ship's interior was converted to suitable winter quarters for the various groups of men—officers, scientists, engineers, and seamen. A Wireless apparatus was rigged, but their location was too remote to receive or transmit signals.

Shackleton was aware of the recent example of Filchner's ship, Deutschland, which had become icebound in the same vicinity three years earlier. After Filchner's attempts to establish a land base at Vahsel Bay failed, his ship was trapped on 6 March 1912, about 200 miles (320 km) off the coast of Coats Land. Six months later, at latitude 63° 37', the ship broke free, then sailed to South Georgia apparently none the worse for its ordeal. Shackleton thought that a similar experience might allow Endurance to make a second attempt to reach Vahsel Bay in the following Antarctic spring.

In February and March, the rate of drift was very slow. At the end of March, Shackleton calculated that the ship had travelled a mere 95 miles (153 km) since 19 January. However, as winter set in the speed of the drift increased, and the condition of the surrounding ice changed. On 14 April, Shackleton recorded the nearby pack "piling and rafting against the masses of ice"—if the ship was caught in this disturbance "she would be crushed like an eggshell". In May, as the sun set for the winter months, the ship was at 75° 23′S, 42° 14′W, still drifting northwards. It would be at least four months before spring brought the chance of an opening of the ice, and there was no certainty that Endurance would break free in time to attempt a return to the Vahsel Bay area. Shackleton now considered the possibility of finding an alternative landing ground on the western shores of the Weddell Sea, if that coast could be reached. "In the meantime", he wrote, "we must wait".

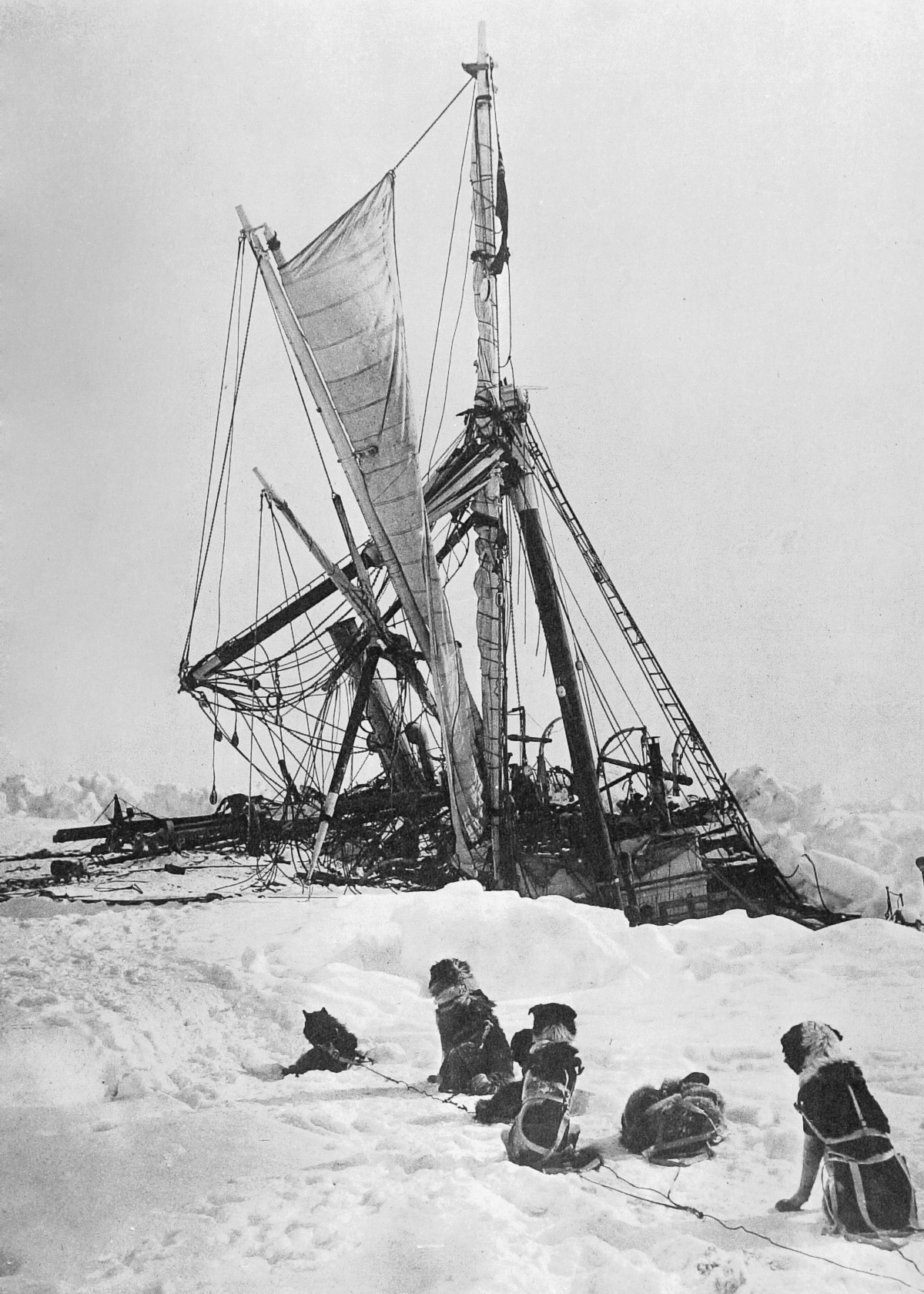
Dogs watching Endurance in the final stages of its drift, shortly before it sank to the bottom of the Weddell Sea

In the dark winter months of May, June and July, Shackleton was concerned with maintaining fitness, training and morale. Although the scope for activity was limited, the dogs were exercised (and on occasion raced competitively), men were encouraged to take moonlight walks, and aboard ship there were attempted theatricals. Special occasions such as Empire Day were duly celebrated. The first signs of the ice breaking up occurred on 22 July. On 1 August, in a south-westerly gale with heavy snow, the ice floe began to disintegrate all around the ship, the pressure forcing masses of ice beneath the keel and causing a heavy list to port. The position was perilous; Shackleton wrote: "The effects of the pressure around us was awe-inspiring. Mighty blocks of ice [...] rose slowly till they jumped like cherry-stones gripped between thumb and finger [...] if the ship was once gripped firmly her fate would be sealed". This danger passed, and the succeeding weeks were quiet. During this relative lull the ship drifted into the area where, in 1823, Captain Benjamin Morrell of the sealer Wasp reported seeing a coastline which he identified as "New South Greenland". There was no sign of any such land; Shackleton concluded that Morrell had been deceived by the presence of large icebergs.

On 30 September, the ship sustained what Shackleton described as "the worst squeeze we had experienced". Worsley described the pressure as like being "thrown to and fro like a shuttlecock a dozen times". On 24 October, the starboard side was forced against a large floe, increasing the pressure until the hull began to bend and splinter, so that water from below the ice began to pour into the ship. When the timbers broke they made noises which sailors later described as being similar to the sound of "heavy fireworks and the blasting of guns". The supplies and three lifeboats were transferred to the ice, while the crew attempted to shore up the ship's hull and pump out the incoming sea. However, after a few days, on 27 October 1915, and in freezing temperatures below −26 °C (−15 °F), Shackleton gave the order to abandon ship. The position at abandonment was 69° 05′S, 51° 30′W. The wreckage remained afloat, and over the following weeks the crew salvaged further supplies and materials, including Hurley's photographs and cameras that had initially been left behind. From around 550 plates, Hurley chose the best 120, the maximum that could be carried, and smashed the rest.

==== Camping on the ice ====
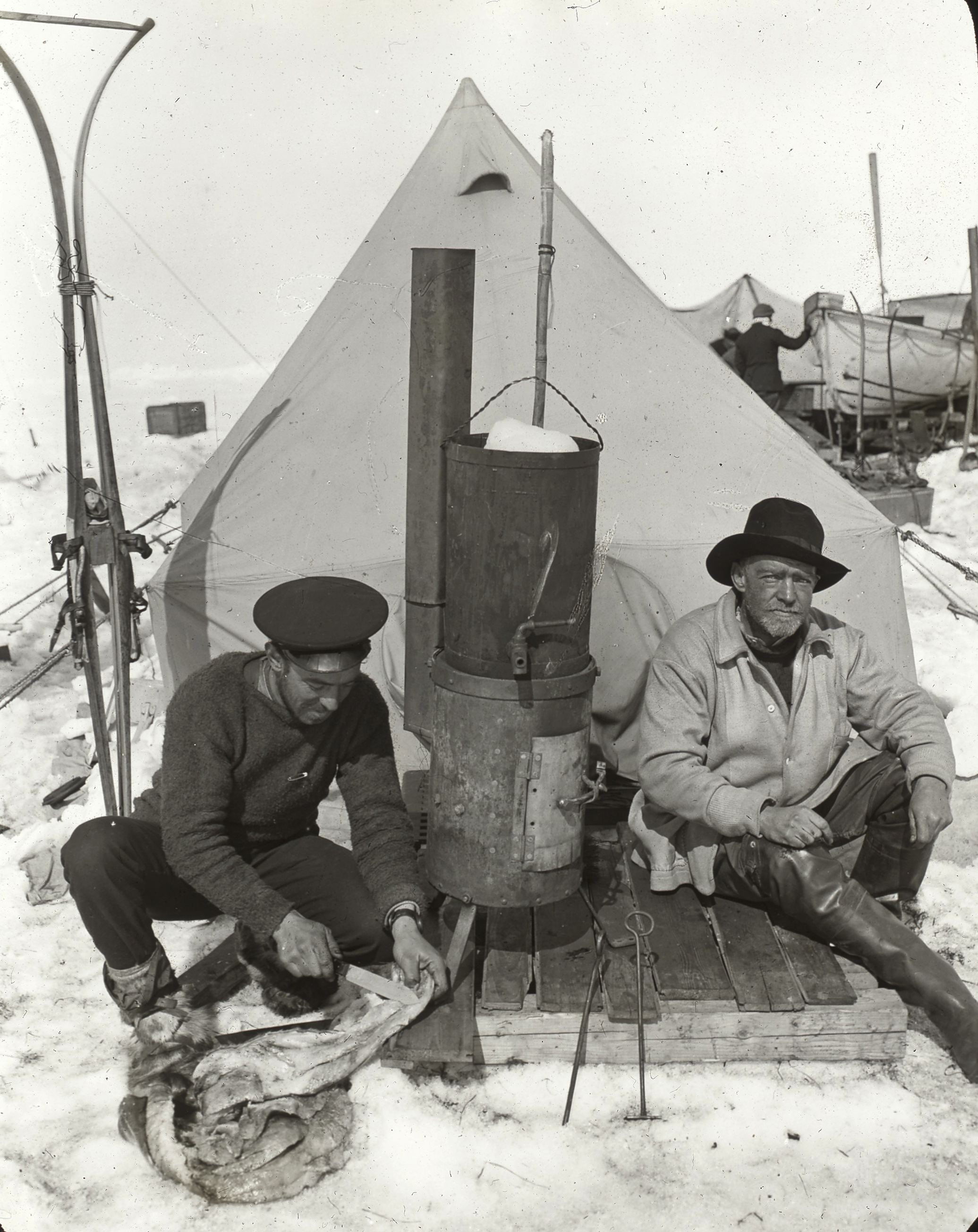
Hurley and Shackleton

With the loss of Endurance the transcontinental plans were abandoned, and the focus shifted to that of survival. Shackleton's intention now was to march the crew westward, to one or other of several possible destinations. His first thought was for Paulet Island, where he knew there was a hut containing a substantial food depot, because he had ordered it 12 years earlier while organising relief for Otto Nordenskjöld's stranded Swedish expedition. Other possibilities were Snow Hill Island, which had been Nordenskjöld's winter quarters and which was believed to contain a stock of emergency supplies, or Robertson Island. Shackleton believed that from one of these islands they would be able to reach and cross Graham Land and get to the whaling outposts in Wilhelmina Bay. He calculated that on the day Endurance was abandoned they were 346 miles (557 km) from Paulet Island. Worsley calculated the distance to Snow Hill Island to be 312 miles (500 km), with a further 120 miles (190 km) to Wilhelmina Bay. He believed the march was too risky; they should wait until the ice carried them to open water, and then escape in the boats. Shackleton over-ruled him.

Before the march could begin, Shackleton ordered the weakest animals to be shot, including the carpenter Harry McNish's cat, Mrs Chippy, and a pup which had become a pet of the surgeon Macklin. The company set out on 30 October 1915, with two of the ship's lifeboats carried on sledges. Problems quickly arose as the condition of the sea ice around them worsened. According to Hurley the surface became "a labyrinth of hummocks and ridges" in which barely a square yard was smooth. In three days, the party managed to travel barely two miles (3.2 km), and on 1 November, Shackleton abandoned the march; they would make camp and await the break-up of the ice. They gave the name "Ocean Camp" to the flat and solid-looking floe on which their aborted march had ended, and settled down to wait. Parties continued to revisit the Endurance wreck, which was still drifting with the ice a short distance from the camp. More of the abandoned supplies were retrieved until, on 21 November, the ship finally slipped beneath the ice. The final resting place of Endurance would remain a mystery for nearly 107 years, until the wreckage was discovered on 5 March 2022.

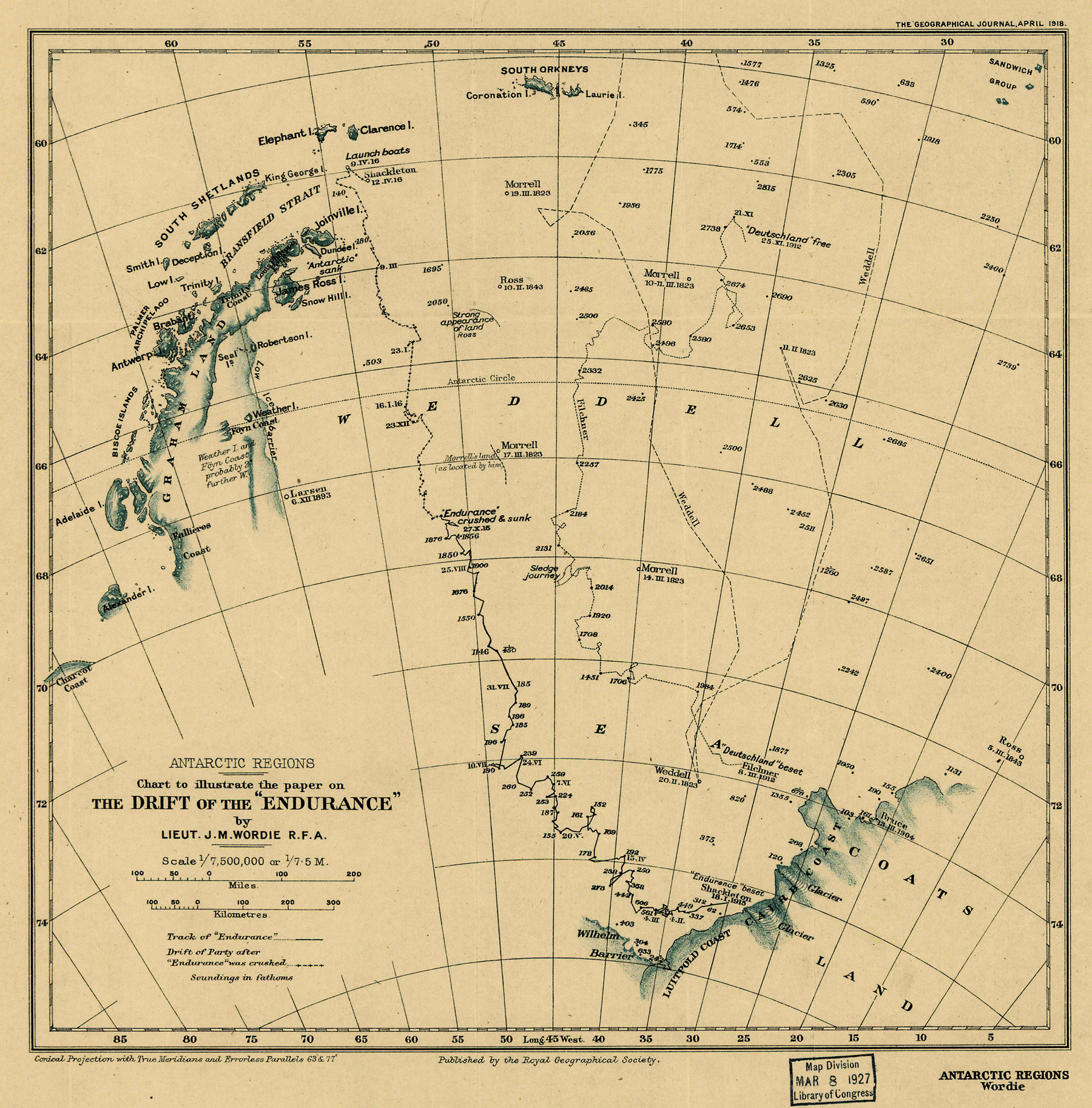
Path of Endurance's drift and the escape route to Elephant Island

The ice was not drifting fast enough to be noticeable, although by late November the speed was up to seven miles (11 km) a day. By 5 December, they had passed 68°S, but the direction was turning slightly east of north. This was taking the transcontinental party to a position from which it would be difficult to reach Snow Hill Island, although Paulet Island, further north, remained a possibility. Paulet Island was about 250 miles (400 km) away, and Shackleton was anxious to reduce the length of the lifeboat journey that would be necessary to reach it. Therefore, on 21 December he announced a second march, to begin on 23 December.

Conditions, however, had not improved since the earlier attempt. Temperatures had risen and it was uncomfortably warm, with men sinking to their knees in soft snow as they struggled to haul the boats through the pressure ridges. On 27 December, McNish rebelled and refused to work, arguing that Admiralty law had lapsed since Endurance's sinking and that he was no longer under orders. Shackleton's firm remonstrance finally brought the carpenter to heel, but the incident was never forgotten. Two days later, with only seven and a half miles (12.1 km) progress achieved in seven back-breaking days, Shackleton called a halt, observing: "It would take us over three hundred days to reach the land". The crew put up their tents and settled into what Shackleton called "Patience Camp", which would be their home for more than three months.

Supplies were now running low. Hurley and Macklin were sent back to Ocean Camp to recover food that had been left there to lighten the sledging teams' burden. On 2 February 1916, Shackleton sent a larger party back to recover the third lifeboat. Food shortages became acute as the weeks passed, and seal meat, which had added variety to their diet, now became a staple as Shackleton attempted to conserve the remaining packaged rations. In January, all but two teams of the dogs (whose overall numbers had been depleted by mishaps and illness in the preceding months) were shot on Shackleton's orders, because the dogs' requirements for seal meat were excessive. The final two teams were shot on 2 April, by which time their meat was a welcome addition to the rations. Meanwhile, the rate of drift became erratic; after being held at around 67° for several weeks, at the end of January there was a series of rapid north-eastward movements which, by 17 March, brought Patience Camp to the latitude of Paulet Island, but 60 nm (111 km) to its east. "It might have been six hundred for all the chance we had of reaching it across the broken sea-ice", Shackleton recorded.

The party now had land more or less continuously in sight. The peak of Mount Haddington on James Ross Island remained in view as the party drifted slowly by. They were too far north for Snow Hill or Paulet Island to be accessible, and Shackleton's chief hopes were now fixed on two remaining small islands at the northern extremity of Graham Land. These were Clarence Island and Elephant Island, around 100 nautical miles (185 km) due north of their position on 25 March. He then decided Deception Island might be a better target destination. This lay far to the west, toward the South Shetland Islands, but Shackleton thought it might be attainable by island-hopping. Its advantage was that it was sometimes visited by whalers and might contain provisions, whereas Clarence Island and Elephant Island were desolate and unvisited. To reach any of these destinations would require a perilous journey in the lifeboats once the floe upon which they were drifting finally broke up. Earlier, the lifeboats had been named after the expedition's three chief financial sponsors: James Caird, Dudley Docker and Stancomb Wills.

==== Lifeboat journey to Elephant Island ====
Paths taken from Endurance's beset to the final rescue

The end of Patience Camp was signalled on the evening of 8 April, when the floe suddenly split. The camp now found itself on a small triangular raft of ice; a break-up of this would mean disaster, so Shackleton readied the lifeboats for the party's enforced departure. He had now decided they would try, if possible, to reach the distant Deception Island because a small wooden church had been reportedly erected for the benefit of whalers. This could provide a source of timber that might enable them to construct a seaworthy boat.

At 1 p.m. on 9 April, the Dudley Docker was launched, and an hour later all three boats were away. Shackleton himself commanded the James Caird, Worsley the Dudley Docker, and navigating officer Hubert Hudson was nominally in charge of the Stancomb Wills, though because of his precarious mental state the effective commander was Tom Crean.

The boats were surrounded by ice, dependent upon leads of water opening up, and progress was perilous and erratic. Frequently the boats were tied to floes, or dragged up onto them, while the men camped and waited for conditions to improve. Shackleton was wavering again between several potential destinations, and on 12 April rejected the various island options and decided on Hope Bay, at the very tip of Graham Land. However, conditions in the boats, in temperatures sometimes as low as −20 °F (−29 °C), with little food and regular soakings in icy seawater, were wearing the men down, physically and mentally. Shackleton therefore decided that Elephant Island, the nearest of the possible refuges, was now the most practical option.

On 14 April, the boats lay off the south-east coast of Elephant Island, but could not land as the shore consisted of perpendicular cliffs and glaciers. Next day the James Caird rounded the eastern point of the island to reach the northern lee shore, and discovered a narrow shingle beach. Soon afterwards, the three boats, which had been separated during the previous night, were reunited at this landing place. It was apparent from high tide markings that this beach would not serve as a long-term camp, so the next day Wild and a crew set off in the Stancomb Wills to explore the coast for a safer site. They returned with news of a long spit of land, seven miles (11 km) to the west. With minimum delay the men returned to the boats and transferred to this new location, which they later christened Cape Wild.

==== Voyage of the James Caird ====
Elephant Island was remote, uninhabited, and rarely visited by whalers or any other ships. If the party was to return to civilisation it would be necessary to summon help. The only realistic way this could be done was to adapt one of the lifeboats for an 800-mile (1,300 km) voyage across the Southern Ocean, to South Georgia. Shackleton had abandoned thoughts of taking the party on the less dangerous journey to Deception Island, because of the poor physical condition of many of his party. Port Stanley in the Falkland Islands was closer than South Georgia but could not be reached, as this would require sailing against the strong prevailing winds.

Shackleton selected the boat party: himself, Worsley, Crean, McNish, and sailors John Vincent and Timothy McCarthy. On instructions from Shackleton, McNish immediately set about adapting the James Caird, improvising tools and materials. Wild was to be left in charge of the Elephant Island party, with instructions to make for Deception Island the following spring should Shackleton not return. Shackleton took supplies for only four weeks, judging that if land had not been reached within that time the boat would be lost.

The 22.5-foot (6.9 m) James Caird was launched on 24 April 1916. The success of the voyage depended on the pin-point accuracy of Worsley's navigation, using observations that would have to be made in the most unfavourable of conditions. The prevailing wind was helpfully north-west, but the heavy sea conditions quickly soaked everything in icy water. Soon ice settled thickly on the boat, making her ride sluggishly. On 5 May, a north-westerly gale almost caused the boat's destruction as it faced what Shackleton described as the largest waves he had seen in 26 years at sea. On 8 May, South Georgia was sighted, after a 14-day battle with the elements that had driven the boat party to their physical limits. Two days later, after a prolonged struggle with heavy seas and hurricane-force winds to the south of the island, the party struggled ashore at King Haakon Bay.

==== South Georgia crossing ====
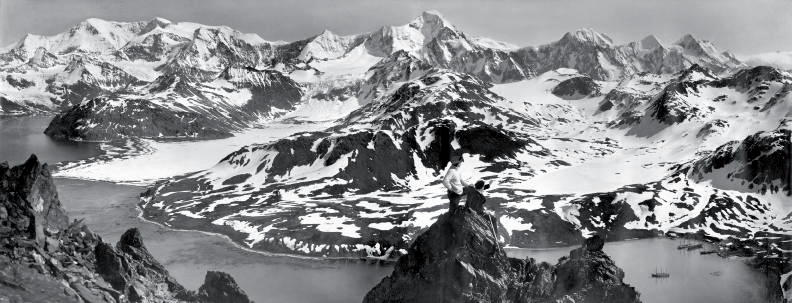
The interior of South Georgia photographed by Frank Hurley

The arrival of the James Caird at King Haakon Bay was followed by a period of rest and recuperation, while Shackleton pondered the next move. The populated whaling stations of South Georgia lay on the northern coast. To reach them would mean either another boat journey around the island, or a land crossing through its unexplored interior. The condition of the James Caird, and the physical state of the party, particularly Vincent and McNish, meant that the crossing was the only realistic option.

After five days, the party took the boat a short distance eastwards, to the head of a deep bay which would be the starting point for the crossing. Shackleton, Worsley and Crean would undertake the land journey, the others remaining at what they christened "Peggotty Camp", to be picked up later after help had been obtained from the whaling stations. A storm on 18 May delayed their start, but by two o'clock the following morning the weather was clear and calm, and an hour later the crossing party set out.

The party's destination was the whaling station at Stromness, which had been Endurance's last port of call on their outbound journey. This was roughly 26 miles (40 km) away, across the edge of the Allardyce Range. Another whaling station was known to be at Prince Olav Harbour, just six miles (10 km) north of Peggotty Camp over easier terrain, but as far as the party was aware, this was only inhabited during the summer months. Shackleton and his men did not know that during their two-year absence in Antarctica, the station's owners had begun year-round operations.

Without a map, the route the party chose was largely conjectural. By dawn they had ascended to 3,000 feet (910 m) and could see the northern coast. They were above Possession Bay, which meant they would need to move eastward to reach Stromness. This meant the first of several backtrackings that would extend the journey and frustrate the men. At the close of that first day, needing to descend to the valley below them before nightfall, they risked everything by sliding down a mountainside on a makeshift rope sledge. They travelled without rest on by moonlight, moving upwards towards a gap in the next mountainous ridge.

Early next morning, 20 May, seeing Husvik Harbour below them, the party knew that they were on the right path. At seven o'clock in the morning, they heard a steam whistle sound from Stromness, "the first sound created by an outside human agency that had come to our ears since we left Stromness Bay in December 1914". After a difficult descent, which involved passage down through a freezing waterfall, they at last reached safety. They were met with shock and disbelief by the whalers at the harbor, who had never seen anyone enter the harbor from the mountains. Both children and men were frightened at the trio's ragged appearance. However, upon meeting with the factory manager, Thoralf Sørlle, the three men were able to wash and given food, clothes, and shelter.

Shackleton wrote afterwards: "I have no doubt that Providence guided us ... I know that during that long and racking march of 36 hours over the unnamed mountains and glaciers it seemed to me often that we were four, not three". This image of a fourth traveller was echoed in the accounts of Worsley and Crean and later influenced T. S. Eliot in the writing of his poem The Waste Land. This phenomenon has been reported by other adventurers and is known as the third man factor.

==== Rescue ====
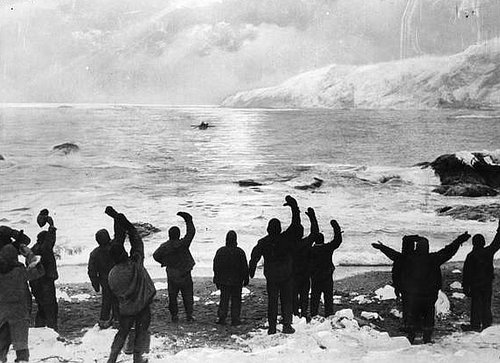
The departure of the James Caird

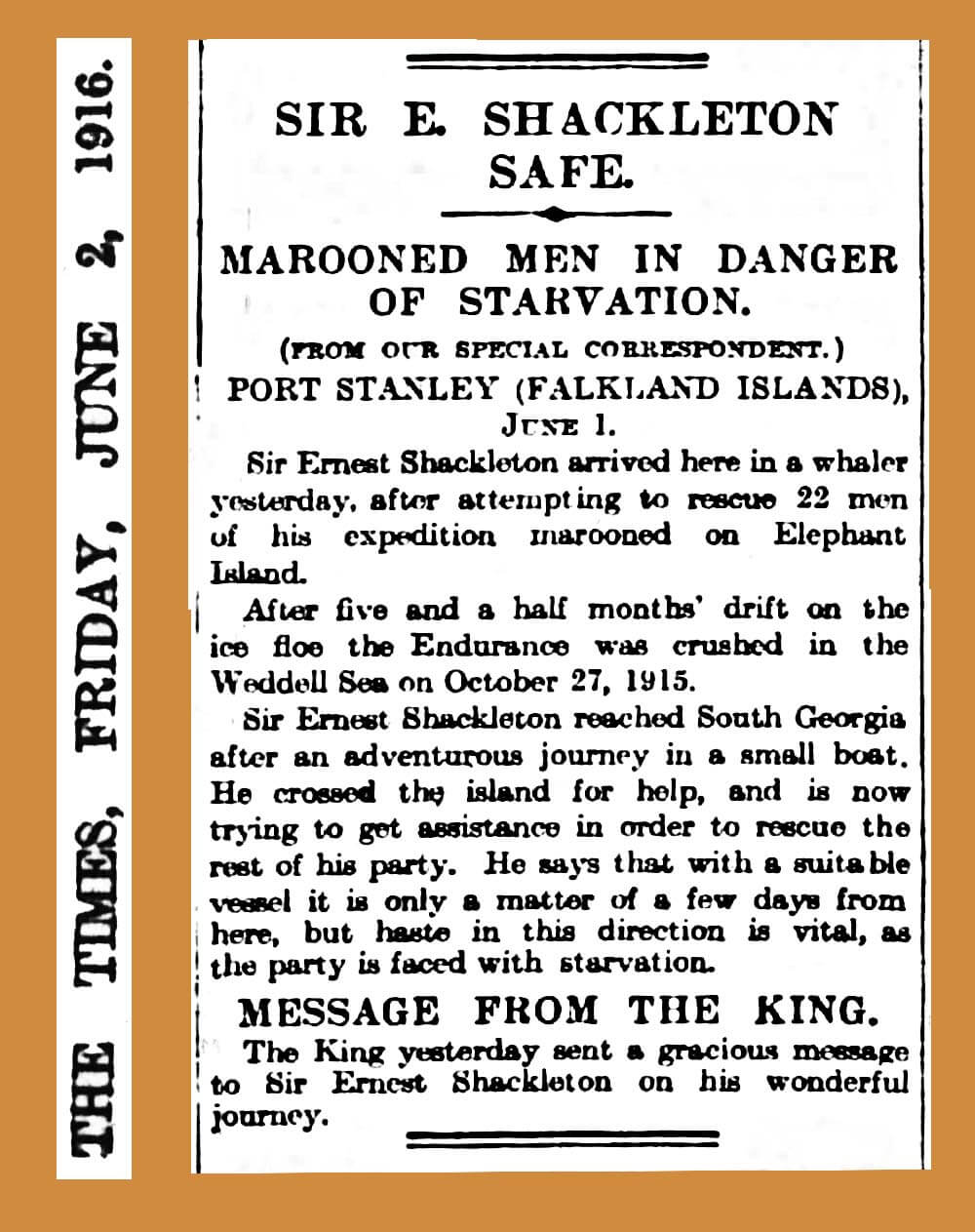
Shackleton's safe return was reported on 2 June 1916 in The Times (shown here) and The Manchester Guardian (full article) after Shackleton's report from the Falkland Islands some 12 days after he had reached Stromness station.

Shackleton's first task, on arriving at the Stromness station, was to arrange for his three companions at Peggotty Camp to be picked up. A whaler was sent round the coast, with Worsley aboard to show the way, and by the evening of 21 May all six of the James Caird party were safe.

It took four attempts before Shackleton was able to return to Elephant Island to rescue the party stranded there. He first left South Georgia a mere three days after he had arrived in Stromness, after securing the use of a large whaler, The Southern Sky, which was laid up in Husvik Harbour. Shackleton assembled a volunteer crew, which had it ready to sail by the morning of 22 May. As the vessel approached Elephant Island they saw that an impenetrable barrier of pack ice had formed, some 70 miles (110 km) from their destination. The Southern Sky was not built for ice breaking, and retreated to Port Stanley in the Falkland Islands.

On reaching Port Stanley, Shackleton informed London by cable of his whereabouts and requested that a suitable vessel be sent south for the rescue operation. He was informed by the Admiralty that nothing was available before October, which in his view was too late. Then, with the help of the British Minister in Montevideo, Shackleton obtained from the Uruguayan government the loan of a tough trawler, Instituto de Pesca No. 1, which started south on 10 June. Again the pack thwarted them. In search of another ship, Shackleton, Worsley and Crean travelled to Punta Arenas, where they met Allan MacDonald, the British owner of the schooner Emma. McDonald equipped this vessel for a further rescue attempt, which left on 12 July, but with the same negative result—the pack defeated them yet again. Shackleton later named a glacier after McDonald on the Brunt Ice Shelf in the Weddell Sea. After problems arose in identifying this glacier, a nearby ice rise was renamed the McDonald Ice Rumples.

By now it was mid-August, more than three months since Shackleton had left Elephant Island. Shackleton begged the Chilean Navy to lend him Yelcho, a small steam tug that had assisted Emma during the previous attempt. They agreed; on 25 August, Yelcho—captained by captain of Chilean Navy Luis Pardo—set out for Elephant Island. This time, as Shackleton recorded, providence favoured them. The seas were open, and the ship was able to approach close to the island in thick fog. At 11:40 a.m. on 30 August, the fog lifted, the camp was spotted and, within an hour, all the Elephant Island party were safely aboard, bound for Punta Arenas.

==== On Elephant Island ====
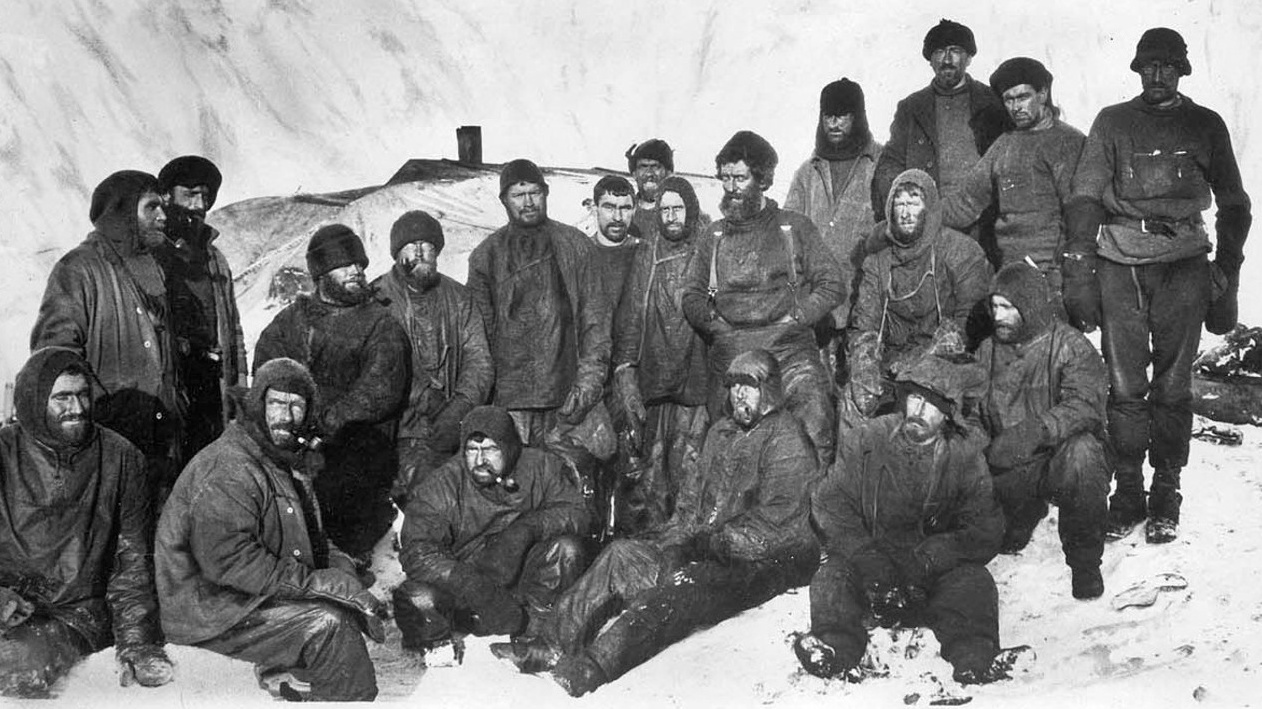
The Elephant Island party. Photo by Hurley. Not shown: Blackborow.; Back row: Greenstreet, McIlroy, Marston, Wordie, James, Holness, Hudson, Stephenson, McLeod, Clark, Orde-Lees, Kerr, Macklin; Front row: Green, Wild, How, Cheetham, Hussey, Rickinson, Bakewell

After Shackleton left with the James Caird, Wild took command of the Elephant Island party, some of whom were in a low state, physically or mentally: Lewis Rickinson had suffered a suspected heart attack; Perce Blackborow was unable to walk, due to frostbitten feet; Hubert Hudson was depressed. The priority for the party was a permanent shelter against the rapidly approaching southern winter. On the suggestion of Marston and Lionel Greenstreet, a hut—nicknamed the "Snuggery" and the "Sty"—was improvised by upturning the two boats and placing them on low stone walls, to provide around five feet (1.5 m) of headroom. By means of canvas and other materials the structure was made into a crude but effective shelter.

Wild initially estimated that they would have to wait one month for rescue, and refused to allow long-term stockpiling of seal and penguin meat because this, in his view, was defeatist. This policy led to sharp disagreements with Orde-Lees, the storekeeper, who was not a popular man and whose presence apparently did little to improve the morale of his companions, unless it was by way of being the butt of their jokes.

As the weeks extended well beyond his initial optimistic forecast, Wild established and maintained routines and activities to relieve the tedium. A permanent lookout was kept for the arrival of the rescue ship, cooking and housekeeping rotas were established, and there were hunting trips for seal and penguin. Concerts were held on Saturdays and anniversaries were celebrated, but there were growing feelings of despondency as time passed with no sign of rescue. The toes on Blackborow's left foot became gangrenous from frostbite and, on 15 June, had to be amputated by surgeons Macklin and McIlroy in the candle-lit hut. Using the last of the chloroform in their medical supplies, the whole procedure took 55 minutes and was a complete success.

By 23 August, it seemed that Wild's no-stockpiling policy had failed. The surrounding sea was dense with pack ice that would halt any rescue ship, food supplies were running out and no penguins were coming ashore. Orde-Lees wrote: "We shall have to eat the one who dies first [...] there's many a true word said in jest". Wild's thoughts were now seriously turning to the possibility of a boat trip to Deception Island—he planned to set out on 5 October, in the hope of meeting a whaling ship— when, on 30 August 1916, the ordeal ended suddenly with the appearance of Shackleton and Yelcho.

=== Ross Sea Party ===
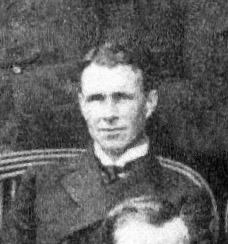
Aeneas Mackintosh, Ross Sea party commander

Aurora left Hobart on 24 December 1914, having been delayed in Australia by financial and organizational problems. The arrival in McMurdo Sound on 15 January 1915 was later in the season than planned, but the party's commander, Aeneas Mackintosh, made immediate plans for a depot-laying journey on the Ross Ice Shelf, since he understood that Shackleton hoped to attempt the crossing during that first season. Neither the men nor the dogs were acclimatised, and the party was, as a whole, very inexperienced in ice conditions. The first journey on the ice resulted in the loss of ten of the party's 18 dogs and a frostbitten and generally demoralised shore party; a single, incomplete depot was their only achievement.

On 7 May, Aurora, anchored at the party's Cape Evans headquarters, was wrenched from her moorings during a gale and carried with drifting ice far out to sea. Unable to return to McMurdo Sound, she remained captive in the ice for nine months until on 12 February 1916, having travelled a distance of around 1,600 miles (2,600 km), she reached open water and limped to New Zealand. Aurora carried with her the greater part of the shore party's fuel, food rations, clothing and equipment, although the sledging rations for the depots had been landed ashore. To continue with its mission the stranded shore party had to re-supply and re-equip itself from the leftovers from earlier expeditions, notably Scott's Terra Nova Expedition, which had been based at Cape Evans a few years earlier. They were thus able to begin the second season's depot-laying on schedule, in September 1915.

In the following months, the required depots were laid, at one-degree intervals across the Ross Ice Shelf to the foot of the Beardmore Glacier. On the return journey from the glacier the party contracted scurvy; Arnold Spencer-Smith, the expedition's chaplain and photographer, collapsed and died on the ice. The remainder of the party reached the temporary shelter of Hut Point, a relic of the Discovery Expedition at the southern end of McMurdo Sound, where they slowly recovered. On 8 May 1916, Mackintosh and Victor Hayward decided to walk across the unstable sea ice to Cape Evans, were caught in a blizzard and were not seen again. The survivors eventually reached Cape Evans, but then had to wait for eight further months. Finally, on 10 January 1917, the repaired and refitted Aurora, whose departure from New Zealand had been delayed by lack of money, arrived to transport them back to civilisation. Shackleton accompanied the ship as a supernumerary officer, having been denied command by the governments of New Zealand, Australia and Great Britain, who had jointly organised and financed the Ross Sea party's relief.

== Return to civilisation, and aftermath ==
The rescued party, having had its last contact with civilisation in 1914, was unaware of the course of the Great War. News of Shackleton's safe arrival in the Falklands briefly eclipsed war news in the British newspapers on 2 June 1916. Yelcho had a "triumphal" welcome in Punta Arenas after its successful mission. The rescuees were then moved to the port of Valparaíso in Central Chile, where they had again a warm welcome; from there they were repatriated. The expedition returned home in piecemeal fashion, at a critical stage in the war, without the normal honours and civic receptions. When Shackleton himself finally arrived in England on 29 May 1917, after a short American lecture tour, his return was barely noticed.

Despite McNish's efforts in preparing and sailing on the James Caird voyage, his prior insubordination meant that, on Shackleton's recommendation, he was one of four men denied the Polar Medal; the others whose contributions fell short of Shackleton's expected standards were John Vincent, William Stephenson and Ernest Holness. Most of the members of the expedition returned to take up immediate active military or naval service. Before the war ended, two—Tim McCarthy of the open boat journey and the veteran Antarctic sailor Alfred Cheetham—had been killed in action, and Ernest Wild, Frank's younger brother and member of the Ross Sea party, had died of typhoid while serving in the Mediterranean. Several others were severely wounded, and many received decorations for gallantry. Following a propaganda mission in Buenos Aires, Shackleton was employed during the last weeks of the war on special service in Murmansk, with the army rank of major. This occupied him until March 1919. He thereafter organised one final Antarctic expedition, the Shackleton–Rowett Expedition on Quest, which left London on 17 September 1921. From the Endurance crew, Wild, Worsley, Macklin, McIlroy, Hussey, Alexander Kerr, Thomas McLeod and cook Charles Green all sailed with Quest.

Shackleton died of a heart attack on 5 January 1922, while Quest was anchored at South Georgia. After his death, the original programme, which had included an exploration of Enderby Land, was abandoned. Wild led a brief cruise which brought them into sight of Elephant Island. They anchored off Cape Wild and were able to see the old landmarks, but sea conditions made it impossible for them to land.

It would be more than forty years before the first crossing of Antarctica was achieved, by the Commonwealth Trans-Antarctic Expedition, 1955–1958. This expedition set out from Vahsel Bay, the same bay Shackleton was in sight of when the Endurance became trapped in ice. They followed a route which avoided the Beardmore Glacier altogether, and bypassed much of the Ross Ice Shelf, reaching McMurdo Sound via a descent of the Skelton Glacier. The entire journey took 98 days.
