= Perce Blackborow =

Welsh sailor (1896–1949)

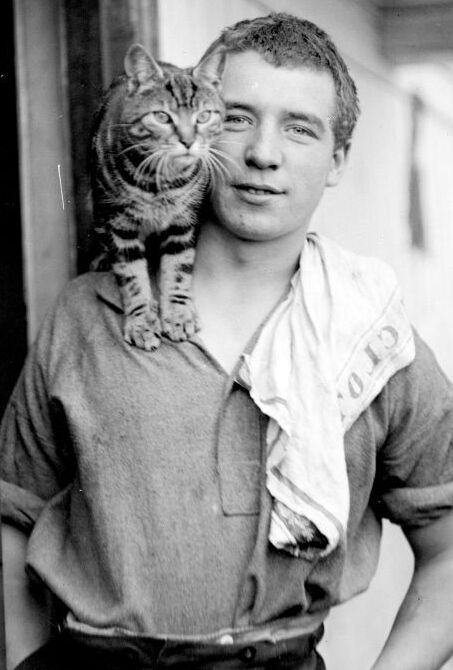
With cat, Mrs Chippy

Perce Blackborow (1896–1949) was a Welsh sailor and a stowaway on Ernest Shackleton's ill-fated Imperial Trans-Antarctic Expedition of 1914–1917.

== Biography ==
Blackborow was born in 1896 in Newport, Monmouthshire, Wales.

=== Intruder on Endurance ===
Blackborow and his friend, William Lincoln Bakewell, travelled to Buenos Aires looking for new employment. There, Bakewell was taken on as an able seaman by Shackleton's ship Endurance, which was en route to the Antarctic, but Blackborow was not hired; at age 18, his youth and inexperience counted against him. Fearing that Endurance was shorthanded, Bakewell and Walter How helped Blackborow sneak aboard, and hid him in a locker amongst piles of clothing. On the third day at sea, once there was no reasonable possibility of turning back, the stowaway was discovered.

Unable to stand, Blackborow had to remain seated in a chair when he met Ernest Shackleton for the first time. Apparently in a fit of genuine rage, Shackleton subjected the stowaway to a severe and terrifying tirade in front of the entire crew. This had the desired effect, and the reactions of the two accomplices were enough to unmask them. Shackleton finished his performance by telling Blackborow, "Do you know that on these expeditions we often get very hungry, and if there is a stowaway available he is the first to be eaten?" To which Blackborow replied, "They’d get a lot more meat off you, sir." Shackleton hid a grin and after chatting with one of the crew members said, "Introduce him to the cook first."

Blackborow proved an asset to the ship as a steward and was eventually signed on.

Following Endurance's entrapment and crushing in the pack ice of the Weddell Sea, the crew relocated to remote, uninhabited Elephant Island in the ship's lifeboats. On arrival, Shackleton thought to give Blackborow, the youngest of the crew, the honor of being the first to step on the island, forgetting that his feet had been severely frostbitten during the wet, cold journey in the boats. Helped over the gunwale, Blackborow fell in the shallows, proclaiming that he was the first man to sit on Elephant Island, and was quickly carried ashore.

=== Frostbite ===
After the Endurance sank, the crew salvaged what they could, with most of their clothing having been already collected. Blackborow, however, had taken the wrong sort of boots and on the crew's journey to Elephant Island via lifeboat, his feet were continuously exposed to the frigid waters of the Southern Ocean for several days. Both developed severe frostbite.

On 24 April 1916, a small party led by Shackleton set sail in the James Caird for distant South Georgia, hoping to return in a few weeks to rescue the others. The rest of the crew, including Blackborow, resigned themselves to waiting on Elephant Island. Almost all were in poor health and spirits. Blackborow had contracted gangrene due to his frostbite, and was surgeon Alexander Macklin's greatest medical concern.

On 15 June, with Shackleton and the James Caird crew having been away for a month, Macklin, assisted by James McIlroy, amputated the toes of Blackborow's left foot, using chloroform for anesthesia. Greenstreet described the operation: "Blackborow had … all the toes of his left foot taken off ¼ inch stumps being left … The poor beggar behaved splendidly and it went without a hitch … Time from start to finish 55 minutes. When Blackborow came to he was cheerful as anything and started joking directly."

When the rescue party finally returned in August, Macklin carried Blackborow outside to see the approaching ship.

Blackborow returned to live in Newport, South Wales, and received the Bronze Polar Medal for his service on the expedition. He died in 1949, of chronic bronchitis and a heart problem, at the age of 53.

== Legacy ==
Blackborow's Antarctic adventures are the subject of two fictionalized accounts, Shackleton's Stowaway by Victoria McKernan (ISBN 0-440-41984-0) and Ice-Cold Heaven by Mirko Bonne (ISBN 978-1-59020-140-4).

In 2022, a memorial to Blackborow was erected in his home city of Newport after campaigning by his granddaughter Rachel Clague. A memorial tree and plaque were installed in Belle Vue Park. The tree was a Nothofagus antarctica (Antarctic Beech).
