= Charles Green (cook) =

British sailor and polar explorer (1888–1974)

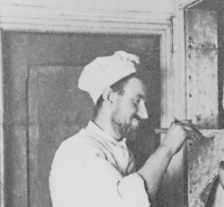
- Born: 24 November 1888; Richmond, Surrey
- Died: 26 September 1974 (aged 85); Hull, England
- Occupation: Ship's cook

Charles J. Green (24 November 1888 – 26 September 1974), also known as Charlie Green, was a British ship's cook who took part in Sir Ernest Shackleton's Imperial Trans-Antarctic Expedition as the cook for the Weddell sea party on board the Endurance. The son of a master baker, Charles learnt to bake, but ran away at the age of 22 to join the Merchant Navy. At an unknown time in his life, Green had an accident which resulted in the loss of one of his testicles. This resulted in Green having a somewhat squeaky and high-pitched voice, which was the source of jokes amongst his fellow crew aboard the Endurance. Whilst in Buenos Aires on board the Andes in October 1914, he heard word that Shackleton had fired the expedition's cook, for drunkenness, and was subsequently hired. Green was described as "conscientious almost to the point of being single-minded" with a "frail" disposition.

During the expedition, Green was assisted by able seaman Perce Blackborow, who had come on board as a stowaway. Green, though subject to "ribbing" from his crew mates, was nonetheless looked upon as a well-liked member of the expedition. His nicknames onboard included Chef or Cookie. He was also sometimes called "Doughballs" due to his high-pitched voice. During the three hours a day that the men worked during their time stuck in the Antarctic pack ice, Green and Blackborow were working day and night in the galley. When the ship sank after being trapped in the ice, he continued to cook for the crew during their camps on the ice, with limited equipment which included a blubber stove. A few days after the crew arrived on Elephant Island, Green collapsed from exhaustion, and was ordered to rest until he recovered.

After the crew were rescued, Green returned to England, though with great difficulty acquiring passage. Upon his arrival, he discovered his parents had cashed out his insurance policy, and his girlfriend had married another man. He joined the Royal Navy as a cook, taking part in World War I. He was wounded in August 1918 whilst serving on the Destroyer H.M.S. Wakeful, and re-joined the Merchant Navy in 1919.

Green was invited to re-join Shackleton on another expedition to Antarctica, the Shackleton–Rowett Expedition, along with many other crew members from Endurance. During this trip, Shackleton gave Green a set of lantern slides before his death shortly after arrival at South Georgia. The expedition continued without Shackleton, but was not a great success. After returning to England in 1922, Green once again rejoined the Merchant Navy, working on board a variety of ships until his retirement in 1931. Green would use the slides given by Shackleton years before to give lectures and tours about the Endurance expedition later in life.

He became a Fire Watcher during World War II within the city of Hull.

Green was one of the last surviving members of the Endurance crew, and attended the 50th Anniversary reunion in 1964 with the two remaining survivors. He died at the age of 85 of peritonitis in Hull.
