= Leonard Hussey =

British explorer (1891–1964)

Leonard Hussey OBE
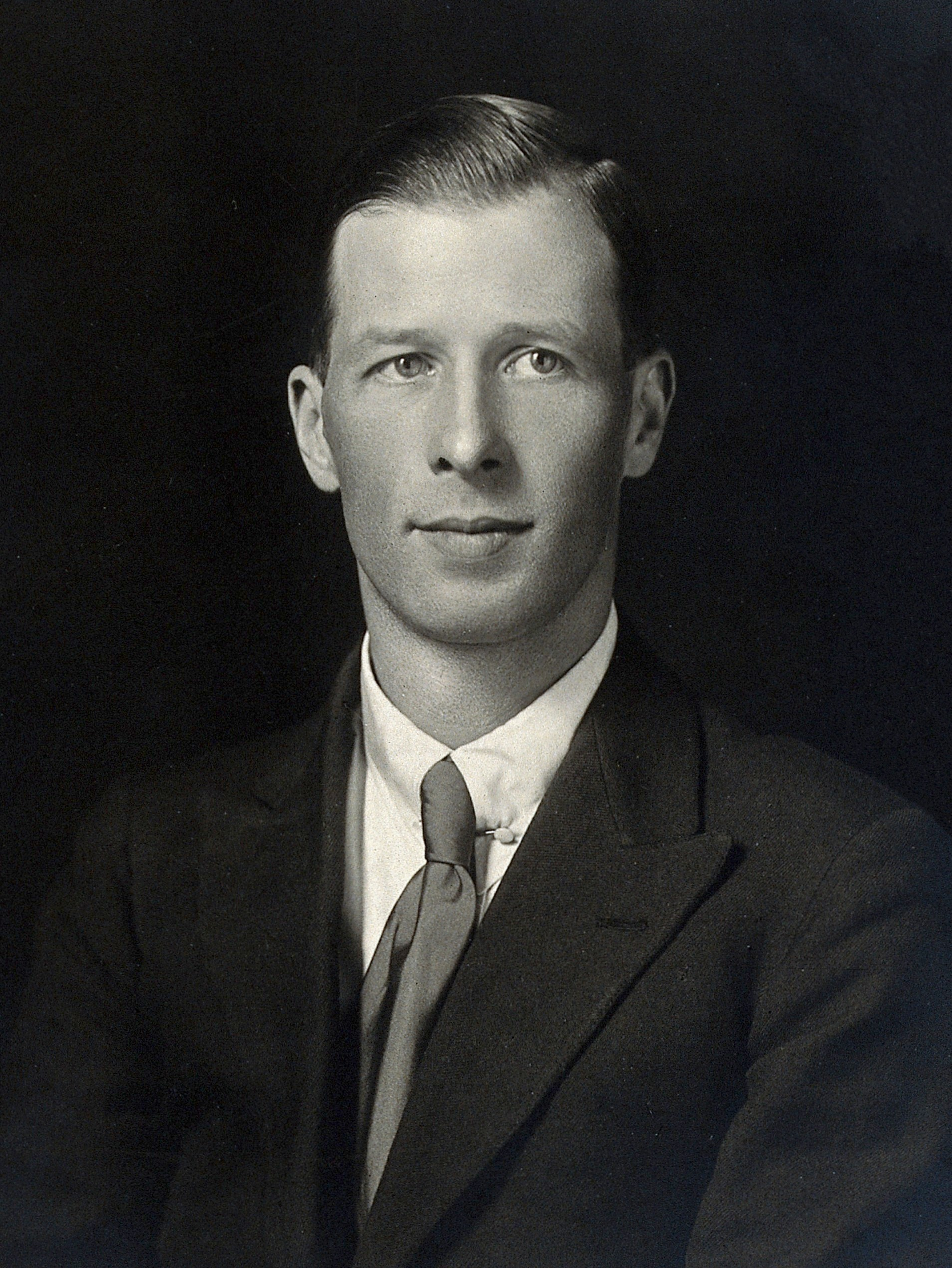
- Born: Leonard Duncan Albert Hussey; 6 May 1891; Leytonstone, London, England
- Died: 25 February 1964 (aged 72); King's College Hospital, London, England
- Education: University of London
- Occupations: Explorer, meteorologist, doctor
- Spouse: Grace Muriel Hellstrom
- Military career
- Allegiance: United Kingdom
- Branch: British Army; Royal Air Force
- Service years: 1912-1919; 1940-1954
- Rank: Squadron leader
- Conflicts: First World War; Russian Civil War; Second World War
- Awards: Officer of the Order of the British Empire (OBE); MID (2)

Leonard Duncan Albert Hussey, OBE (6 May 1891 – 25 February 1964) was an English meteorologist, archaeologist, explorer, medical doctor and member of Ernest Shackleton's Imperial Trans-Antarctic and Shackleton–Rowett Expeditions. During the latter, he was with Shackleton at his death, and transported the body part-way back to England.

Hussey was also a member of the armed forces during World War I, serving in France and with Shackleton in Russia. After returning to private practice, Hussey rejoined the war effort in 1940 and became a decorated medical officer with the Royal Air Force during the Second World War. Returning once again to civilian practice in 1946, he was a member of the Royal College of Physicians, a lecturer, author, and Boy Scouts leader prior to retirement. Many of the items he collected during his career were donated to a number of museums.

== Early life ==
Hussey was born to James Hussey and Eliza Hussey (née Aitken) in Norman House, Norman Road in Leytonestone, in London. His father was a machine operator in the stationery printing industry . By 1900, the family resided at 342 Kingsland Road in Leytonestone. Leonard Hussey had eight siblings in total; three brothers, James, William and Percy and five sisters, Maude, Beatrice, May, Blanche and Daisy.

Hussey attended Strand School and Hackney P.T. Centre. On 6 October 1909, Hussey entered the University of London, taking as course in psychology and gaining a Bachelor of Science second class at King's College London, as well as degrees in meteorology and anthropology.

== Career ==
=== Sudan and Shackleton ===
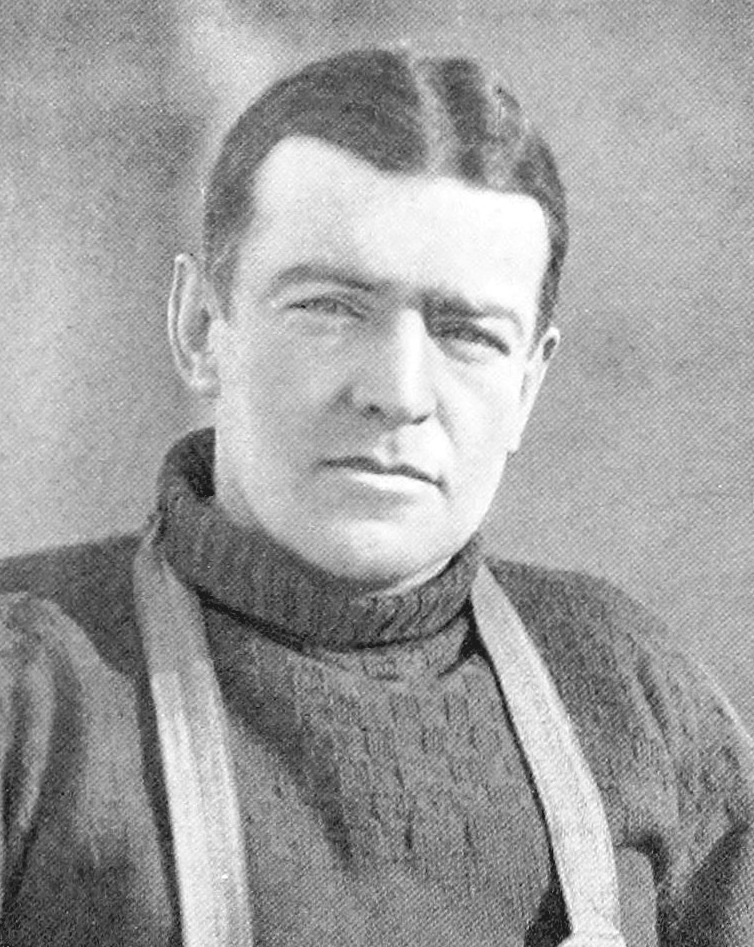
"He called for me, looked me up and down, walked up and down when he was talking to me, didn't seem to take any notice. Finally he said, 'Yes, I like you, I'll take you.' He told me afterwards he took me because he thought I looked funny!" – Hussey on his acceptance by Shackleton (pictured) for his Antarctic expedition.

From 1913, Hussey had undertaken employment as an anthropologist and archaeologist at a dig in Jebel Moya, Sudan as part of Henry Wellcome's Expedition. Alongside O. G. S. Crawford, Hussey worked on a monthly pay of £8. While in Sudan, he read in a month-old newspaper about Shackleton's intention to embark on an Antarctic Expedition, and 'The idea gripped me'. He wrote to Shackleton expressing his interest in joining the project. Shackleton replied telling Hussey to call on him when he returned to London. 'My luck in this respect was later explained to me by Shackleton, who said he was greatly amused to find amongst nearly five thousand applications to join the expedition, one that came from the heart of Africa.' Shackleton agreed to select him for the expedition, later telling him that he did so because he "looked funny".

=== Imperial Trans-Antarctic Expedition 1914–17 ===
Reginald James, sitting on the left, working during the expedition. He is examining a Dines anemometer while Leonard Hussey works on the right.

Hussey joined the Imperial Trans-Antarctic Expedition of 1914–1917's Weddell Sea party as a meteorologist, keeping a leather-bound diary of the entire expedition. He was a popular member of the group due to his humour and perpetual playing of his five-string banjo, in company with Dr. James McIlroy's imitations of the trombone and bagpipes. Frank Worsley stated "Hussey was a brilliant wit, and his keen repartee was one of the few joys left to us. Often we would combine to provoke him just for the pleasure of hearing his clever retorts and invariably he would emerge the victor, no matter how many of us tried to best him." On 22 June 1915, Hussey and the crew staged a four-hour "smoking concert" and costume party, during which Hussey dressed as a black minstrel. In Shackleton, Roland Huntford described Hussey's tendency to be "determinedly cheery to the point of egregiousness".

The banjo, weighing twelve pounds, was rescued from the wreck of the Endurance as "vital mental medicine" by Shackleton. Despite his earlier instructions that each person could take only 2 pounds in weight of personal belongings, he made an exception so that the instrument could be saved. On 24 April 1916, while Shackleton took five other men from camp on South Georgia on the James Caird to find help, Hussey was one of the 22 men left behind on Elephant Island to await rescue, and continued to use his banjo to improve morale.

=== World War I ===
Hussey initially joined the London University contingent of the Officers' Training Corps, and was commissioned as a second lieutenant in the cadets on 13 November 1912. Hussey progressed to the full armed forces in the later years of the First World War, and was commissioned as a temporary second lieutenant in the Royal Garrison Artillery on 19 January 1917, serving in France, as well as operating with Shackleton on operations at Murmansk in northern Russia as part of the Polar Bear Expedition. He was promoted to temporary lieutenant on 19 July 1918, and to the temporary rank of captain on 8 October. Hussey was demobilised on 14 May 1919, retaining the rank of captain.

=== Shackleton–Rowett Antarctic Expedition 1921–22 ===
The vagaries of the climate quite bewilder Hussey. For just when he thinks it is going to do one thing the precise opposite happens.

— Thomas Orde-Lees on Hussey in the Antarctic

Following the end of World War I, Hussey qualified in medicine and returned to Shackleton for his expedition to Antarctica aboard the Quest in 1921–22.

Hussey was asked by Frank Wild, following Shackleton's death in harbour in South Georgia, to escort the body to England while Wild himself assumed command of the Quest. Hussey arrived in South America and cabled England with news of the explorer's passing. Shackleton's widow responded that the explorer should be buried at Grytviken in South Georgia, and Hussey carried out these instructions.

=== Medical career in London ===
Following his return to England, Hussey practised medicine in London until 1940. He had become a member of the Royal College of Surgeons and a Licentiate of the Royal College of Physicians, while residing at 328 Clapham Road, in London.

=== World War II ===
Hussey joined the RAF as a medical officer during the Second World War, with the rank of flight lieutenant and the serial number 87314. He served in Iceland as First Senior Medical Officer in the temporary rank of squadron leader, to which he was promoted on 1 July 1943 and then at RAF Benson in Oxfordshire. He was Mentioned in Despatches on two occasions in 1945, on 1 January and 14 May. Appointed an Officer of the Order of the British Empire in the 1946 New Year Honours, Hussey retained his links to the RAF for a time after the end of the war, serving in the Royal Air Force Volunteer Reserve as a squadron leader, until his retirement on 10 February 1954.

=== Later career ===
Following the end of the war, Hussey resumed his medical practice, operating as a GP in Hertfordshire up until 1957. He was appointed Officer of the Order of the British Empire (OBE) in the 1946 New Year Honours for his war service, and in 1949 he served on the SS Clan Macauley as a ship's surgeon, sailing from England to South Africa and Australia. Hussey was involved in the re-formation of the London Banjo Club and served for several years as president despite often being abroad for his work as ship's surgeon. He also published his account of the Trans-Antarctic expedition entitled South with Endurance. By 1957, having retired from his practice, Hussey became President of the Antarctic Club. A Shackleton-Hussey trophy was created and awarded by Hussey to several scout movements from the 1960s, including the Chorleywood Scout pack, of which Hussey was at one time the President of as part of his growing involvement in the scout movement following his retirement.

=== Death ===
In 1960, Hussey retired to Ferring, and was forced to curtail his lecturing career due to poor health. His notes and lantern slides were donated to Ralph Gullett, a local scout leader and friend, who took over his lecturing. His banjo, which he took along with him on expeditions and later had on display at his practice, was signed by all the members of Endurance, and donated to the National Maritime Museum and was valued in 2004 at over £150,000. Hussey died in London in 1964 at the age of 72, and was survived by his wife, who died in 1980. The couple had no children, and his estate was passed to his housekeeper, Margaret Mock, until her own death in 1999.

== Published works and decorations ==
Hussey published a number of works throughout his life, including editing the records of both of Shackleton's expeditions, and a number of articles in partnership with other expedition members.

- South with Shackleton – Hussey's account, published in 1949, of the 1914–1916 expedition.
- Scurvy in Polar Regions – in The Lancet

He was also the recipient of a number of decorations for his work in both world wars and as a member of Shackleton's expeditions.

- A Military OBE
- British War Medal
- Mercantile Marine War Medal
- Victory Medal
- Defence Medal
- War Medal 1939–1945 with Oak leaves for Mention in Despatches, 1 January and 14 May 1945.
- Silver Polar Medal with the Antarctic 1914–16 bar.
