= Lewis Rickinson =

English marine engineer (1883–1945)

Lewis Raphael Rickinson (21 April 1883 – 16 April 1945) was an English marine engineer. He is best known for his service in the Imperial Trans-Antarctic Expedition of 1914–1916, for which he was awarded the Silver Polar Medal.

== Biography ==
Rickinson was born on 21 April 1883 in Lewisham, which was then part of the County of Kent but has since become part of Greater London. His father was Charles Napier Rickinson and his mother was Emma Isaac Rickinson. As a man trained for work with marine engines, he signed on the Endurance as the chief engineer. Although the Endurance was rigged as a barquentine, it also had a coal-burning engine and spent much of its time under steam.

Under the expedition plans and the articles that Rickinson had signed as chief engineer, his job was to work the engines during the Antarctic summer of 1914–1915 to get the Endurance to the Filchner Ice Shelf. Once the vessel had reached her destination, she and her crew were supposed to unload the expedition leader, Sir Ernest Shackleton, and a shore party for expedition work in the interior of Antarctica. Rickinson and the ship's company were then supposed to steam north toward warmer waters to avoid the worst of the Antarctic winter of 1915. However, when the Endurance was beset by pack ice in the Weddell Sea, these plans could not be implemented. With all of the other members of the expedition, Rickinson was first forced to spend the winter in the depths of the southern Weddell Sea, and then shared the fate of his fellow explorers as castaways when the mother ship was crushed and sunk by the ice. After camping on the melting ice for some months, the ship's company and shore party were forced to take to lifeboats. Rickinson was assigned to the lifeboat Stancomb Wills.

Shackleton was impressed by Rickinson's ability to take on his share of the survival duties of the party. In April 1916, when the lifeboat party was making a hazardous landing on the shore of Elephant Island off the coast of the Antarctic Peninsula, Rickinson was stricken while wading ashore in the surf. Once all were safely on shore, the expedition doctor diagnosed the 32-year-old engineer with a mild heart attack. He was advised to rest as much as possible in a crude lean-to hut, the Snuggery, built by the men. Meanwhile, Shackleton and a picked crew of volunteers had separated from the main party to mount a forlorn open-boat attempt to escape from Antarctica and fetch help for the Elephant Island castaways, including Rickinson. After enduring more than four months of near-starvation rations Rickinson, who was still classified as an invalid, was rescued from Elephant Island with his comrades. His time in the Antarctic was over; it was 30 August 1916.

Upon returning to Britain Rickinson found World War I being fought. Despite his cardiac diagnosis he joined the colours, was passed as fit, and served in the Royal Navy. In 1918 he married Marjorie Kate Snell. Two children, son Lewis F. Rickinson (1919) and daughter Betty Rickinson (1923), were born of this union. With the coming of peace Rickinson chose life on shore. He became a consulting engineer, specializing in the shipbuilding design and installation of marine power units.

With the coming of World War II, Rickinson rejoined the colours and was assigned to HMS Pembroke, the pseudo-floating naval barracks and training establishment at Chatham in the Medway. He rose to the rank of engineer naval commander and served until his diagnosis with lung cancer. He was seconded to a Newbury, Berkshire nursing home for hospice care, and died there in April 1945, age 61.

== Legacy ==
In 1916–17, Rickinson was awarded the Polar Medal in silver.
