= Thomas Orde-Lees =

British explorer and military officer (1877–1958)

Major Thomas Orde-Lees OBE, AFC
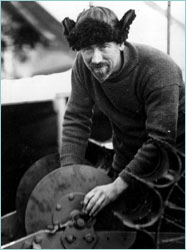
- Born: 23 May 1877; Aachen, Rhine Province, Kingdom of Prussia, German Empire
- Died: 1 December 1958 (aged 81); Wellington, New Zealand
- Other names: Colonel, Old Lady, Belly Burglar, Man of Action
- Occupation: Explorer
- Spouses: Rene; Hisako Hoya
- Military career
- Allegiance: United Kingdom
- Branch: Royal Navy; British Army
- Service years: 1895–1919
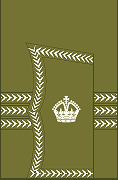
- Rank: Major
- Conflicts: Boxer Rebellion; First World War
- Awards: OBE; AFC

Major Thomas Hans Orde-Lees, OBE, AFC (23 May 1877 – 1 December 1958) was a member of Sir Ernest Shackleton's Imperial Trans-Antarctic Expedition of 1914–1917, a pioneer in the field of parachuting, and was one of the first non-Japanese-born men known to have climbed Mount Fuji during the winter.

== Early life ==
Thomas Hans Orde-Lees was born on 23 May 1877, officially during his parents' holiday in Aachen in what was then Prussia. In fact he was the illegitimate child of Thomas Orde Hastings Lees, a former barrister and the Chief constable of Northampton, and Ada Mary Pattenden (1852–1932), a daughter of the Reverend Canon George Edwin Pattenden, headmaster of Boston Grammar School. Ada was sent off to Thomas' brother's house in Aachen for the birth.

The Lees family was well off; they lived in the Northampton Chief Constable's house with a number of servants. Thomas the Elder's wife, Grace Lees (née Bateman), agreed to bring up young Thomas as her own. She was made godmother of Ada's nephew Frederick Geoffrey Lees Johnson (1880–1951), an arrangement that provided cover for Grace, Ada and Thomas the Elder to meet up regularly. Ada married Arthur John Coleridge Mackarness, a solicitor, (son of John Fielder Mackarness, Bishop of Oxford) in 1890. Following the death of Thomas the Elder in 1924, Grace took up residence with Arthur and Ada Mackarness at Petersfield. Thomas the Younger kept up with his biological mother until her death in 1932.

Orde-Lees was educated at Marlborough College, the Royal Naval Academy at Gosport (whose headmaster was Ada's brother-in-law, Frederick George Johnson) and the Royal Military College, Sandhurst. He joined the Royal Marines, also serving among British paratroopers on the western front, and was commissioned a second lieutenant in 1895, with promotion to lieutenant on 1 July 1896, and to captain on 16 April 1902. In 1900 he was posted to China and saw action during the Boxer Rebellion.

== Imperial Trans-Antarctic Expedition ==
In 1910 Orde-Lees applied for a place on Scott's Terra Nova Expedition, but was turned down. When Ernest Shackleton was organizing the Imperial Trans-Antarctic Expedition he decided that he needed a representative from the Royal Navy in order to get political and military support for the expedition. Orde-Lees as a skier and motor expert fitted the bill, and after Shackleton applied to Churchill for permission, Orde-Lees was released from his military duties and allowed to join the expedition as storekeeper.

On board ship he proved unpopular with the rest of the crew – he had a surly, condescending manner and was undisguisedly lazy. Having been labeled as somewhat of a bully amongst the crew, Shackleton referred to him privately as the "Old Lady" during the expedition. Nevertheless, he proved to be an efficient storekeeper. He had a keen interest in physical fitness and took his bicycle on the expedition; after the ship became trapped in the ice he frequently took cycling trips on the ice. On one occasion, he spent over two hours on his bike outside the ship, and Shackleton was sufficiently worried to send a search party to look for him. Shackleton ordered him not to leave the ship unaccompanied after he became lost while searching for food, and encountered a fierce leopard seal. His cries brought second in-command Frank Wild out of his tent, who shot the leopard seal at a distance of 10 m (30 ft) from Orde-Lees.

When the Endurance was crushed by pack ice, Shackleton took the three lifeboats and led the men over the ice to open water where they used the boats to travel to Elephant Island. Orde-Lees was assigned to the Dudley Docker under the command of Frank Worsley but failed to pitch in with the other men when a gale threatened to sink the small craft. Despite orders from Worsley, he climbed into his sleeping bag rather than helping with the rowing, although he immediately undertook strenuous and prolonged bailing duty when it looked as if the boat was going to sink.

Once the boats had arrived at Elephant Island, Shackleton and five men set out for South Georgia in the James Caird to fetch help. The remaining men, including Orde-Lees, were to spend months living in the remaining two boats, overturned and reinforced with stones and lit by blubber lamps. They were finally rescued on 30 August 1916. For his part in the expedition Orde-Lees received the Silver Polar Medal.

== After the expedition ==
=== Parachutist ===
On Orde-Lees' return to England, World War I was raging. By now an honorary major, Orde-Lees returned to active service with the Royal Marines on 12 November 1916. After serving on the Western Front in the Balloon Corps, Orde-Lees, with the assistance of Shackleton, secured a place in the Royal Flying Corps on 1 August 1917 where he became an enthusiastic advocate for the use of parachutes. He jumped from Tower Bridge into the River Thames to prove their effectiveness and a Parachute Committee was formed with Orde-Lees as secretary to investigate the use of parachutes for pilots. He was awarded the Air Force Cross in the 1919 New Year Honours list, and was appointed an Officer of the Order of the British Empire (OBE) on 10 October. After the war, however, Orde-Lees resigned his commission on 25 April 1919 (reportedly rather than facing a Court Martial after his involvement with a parachuting course for women sponsored by the Daily Mail) and moved to Japan where he taught parachuting techniques to the Japanese Air Force.

=== Japan: Mount Fuji ===
In Japan, Orde-Lees is best known for his winter climbs on Mount Fuji. After an unsuccessful attempt in January 1922, Orde-Lees and a climbing companion, H.S. Crisp, successfully summited the iconic stratovolcano on 12 February 1922.

After his parachute-training duties ceased, Orde-Lees continued to live in Tokyo. He worked for a time as a correspondent for The Times, which led to an appointment at the British Embassy. His first wife having died, he remarried to a local Japanese woman, Hisako Hoya. He spent almost 20 years teaching English and reading the English news on Japanese Radio.

=== New Zealand ===
When Japan entered World War II in 1941, Orde-Lees, as a resident alien and citizen of a hostile power, was allowed to leave with his family; they moved to Wellington, New Zealand. There he took a menial job at the New Zealand Correspondence School, although there were rumours that he was working as a spy for the British Government. After the war he wrote a regular children's travel column in the Southern Cross Newspaper and helped organise the Commonwealth Trans-Antarctic Expedition.

He died on 1 December 1958 after being confined to a mental hospital due to his dementia. He is buried in Karori Cemetery, Wellington, close to fellow Endurance crew member, Harry McNish.

== Legacy ==
In the 2002 television film, Shackleton, Orde-Lees is portrayed by actor Nicholas Rowe.

Orde-Lees is part of a series of stamps that were issued by the British Antarctic Territory and the government of the South Georgia & The South Sandwich Islands. The set of stamps commemorate the centenary of the end of World War I, as well as the role of Shackleton's men played in contributing to the war effort.
