= Thomas McLeod (sailor) =

Scottish sailor (1869–1960)

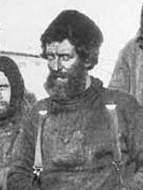
- McLeod as a member of the Elephant Island party
- Born: 10 November 1869; Glasgow, Scotland
- Died: 16 December 1960 (aged 87); Kingston, Ontario, Canada

Thomas Frank McLeod (10 November 1873 – 16 December 1960) was a Scottish sailor who took part in three expeditions to the South Pole. Born in Glasgow to Barbara McLeod, he grew up in Stornoway, on the Isle of Lewis in the Outer Hebrides. He first went to sea aged 14, and in 1910 joined the Terra Nova Expedition, led by Robert Falcon Scott as an able seaman (AS). During the expedition, Scott and other members of the sledging party died, and the Terra Nova returned to England in 1913. McLeod and the other seamen were all awarded the Polar Medal.

A year later, in 1914, McLeod joined the Imperial Trans-Antarctic Expedition, this time led by Ernest Shackleton, again serving as an able seaman. During this expedition, the ship Endurance sunk after becoming trapped in sea-ice. The crew were forced to camp on ice, and then row to the relative safety of Elephant Island, where they were later rescued after Shackleton and some of the men rowed to South Georgia to gain help. During this time, McLeod picked up a bible which had been discard by Shackleton (after removing a few pages). Once the men of the Endurance were rescued from Elephant Island, McLeod later bestowed the Bible to a family that he was staying with during his convalescence in Punta Arenas. The Bible is now in the possession of the Royal Geographical Society in London. McLeod was later awarded a second Polar Medal.

McLeod joined a third expedition to the pole in 1921, the Shackleton–Rowett Expedition, initially led by Shackleton, but later by second-in-command Frank Wild. The expedition was not a success, and the ship returned home in 1922.

In 1923, McLeod emigrated to Canada, initially working as a fisherman, and then later a school caretaker and a night watchman. McLeod was a lifelong bachelor, and in his later years he moved into a retirement home in Kingston, Ontario, where he died on 16 December 1960, aged 87. McLeod was buried in Cataraqui Cemetery. The headstone in the cemetery displays his name misspelled as Thomas MacLeod. His colleague Shackleton is misspelled as Shackelton.
