= John Vincent (sailor) =

English sailor and Antarctic explorer (1884–1941)

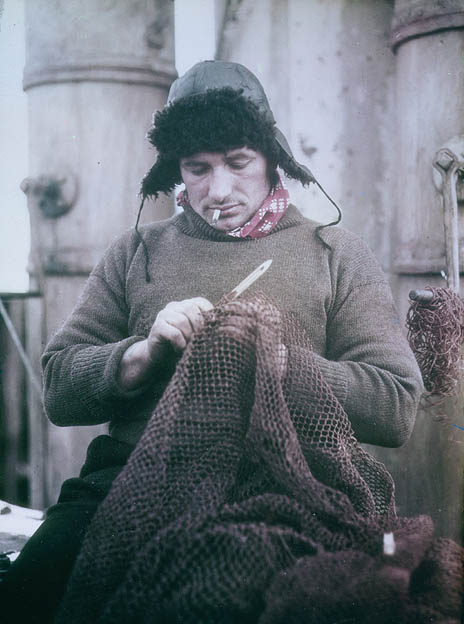
- 1915 Paget colour photograph by Frank Hurley
- Born: 24 January 1884; Birmingham, England
- Died: 19 January 1941 (aged 56); Grimsby, England
- Occupations: Seaman, explorer

John William Vincent (24 January 1884 – 19 January 1941) was an English seaman and member of Ernest Shackleton's Imperial Trans-Antarctic Expedition. He was one of the five men who accompanied Shackleton on his epic crossing from Elephant Island to South Georgia and was one of only four of the crew of Endurance not to receive the Polar Medal.

== Early life ==
Vincent was born in Birmingham on 24 January 1884. He became a sailor at the age of 13 after running away and later became a trawlerman working in the North Sea fleet out of Hull. At the time, trawling was one of the most dangerous of trades, which bred tough men, and Vincent was no exception, in addition, He was a keen amateur boxer and wrestler.

== Imperial Trans-Antarctic Expedition ==
The Imperial Trans-Antarctic Expedition was organised by Ernest Shackleton as an attempt to be the first expedition to cross the Antarctic continent. Vincent was originally taken on as the bosun, but after a row with Thomas Orde-Lees and complaints of bullying from members of the fo'c'sle crew, he was called to Shackleton's cabin and demoted to Able Seaman. He did not cause any further trouble, but Shackleton kept a watchful eye on him: after the Endurance was crushed by the ice and the men were forced to use the three small lifeboats to reach Elephant Island, Shackleton made sure that Vincent was among the men in his boat. He also chose him as part of the six-man crew of the James Caird who were to sail to South Georgia to fetch help. Though some sources say Shackleton didn't want to leave him on the island where he could spread dissent, this contradicts Shackleton's own feelings about needing a strong crew to navigate to South Georgia, and Vincent was noted as the fittest man on arriving at Elephant Island. Vincent and Harry McNish were pitched into the water as the boat was launched, and Vincent's refusal to exchange his jersey led to unkind comments among the beach party that he had some of their possessions concealed about his person, though this also has conflicting reports. Although Vincent was the strongest man in the crew, he fared badly during the voyage to South Georgia: he was almost washed overboard, when chipping ice that had accumulated on the Caird, only just grabbing the main mast in time. Shackleton recorded that two of the crew, Vincent and McNish, were very close to death, and although McNish showed "grit and spirit", Vincent ceased to be an active member of the crew, because he had become so ill.

When the crew of the James Caird arrived at South Georgia, they landed on the wrong side of the island. While the rest of the crew busied themselves with preparations for the trip over the mountains which they had to make to reach the whaling station at Husvik, Vincent showed no signs of improvement. McNish recorded in his diary:

While the skipper does the Nimrod & bring home the food Vincent lays down by the fire & smokes some times coming out for more wood while the Boss & Crean looks after the cooking & McCarthy is my assistant.

It was clear that neither McNish nor Vincent could continue, so Shackleton left them in the care of Timothy McCarthy and set out on the trip over the mountains with Frank Worsley and Tom Crean. After the three men arrived at the whaling station, Shackleton sent Worsley back on board one of the whaling ships to pick up Vincent, McNish and McCarthy and then arranged passage back to England for them while he, Worsley, and Crean set about organising a rescue of the men on Elephant Island.

Shackleton was later to deny Vincent the Polar Medal, awarded to everybody in the crew except McNish, who had rebelled on the ice, and the three trawlermen: William Stephenson, Ernest Holness and Vincent. Alexander Macklin, one of the ship's surgeons, thought the withholding of the medal a bit hard: "They were perhaps not very endearing characters but they never let the expedition down".

== After the expedition ==
The grave of John Vincent in Scartho Road Cemetery in Grimsby in 2026

In 1918 Vincent joined the crew of a vessel chartered by the Foreign Office which was torpedoed while on service in the Mediterranean. He survived, and after World War I again took up work as a trawlerman. He worked for a time in Finland, but although he was offered a permanent position as a fishing instructor with the Finnish government, his wife did not wish to move. Instead, he settled in Grimsby where he and his wife raised a family of five sons and four daughters.

During World War II he served in the Royal Naval Reserve and was given command of the armed trawler HM Trawler Alfredian which worked off the North and East coasts. While on board the Alfredian he developed pneumonia and was transferred to the Naval Hospital in Grimsby. He died on 19 January 1941 and was buried in Grimsby's Scartho Road Cemetery.

== Bibliography ==
- Caroline Alexander (1998). Endurance. London: Bloomsbury. p. 211. ISBN 0-7475-4123-X.
- "Endurance Obituaries: John William Vincent". HMS Endurance Tracking Project. 2005. Archived from the original on 8 July 2007.
- Paul Ward (2001). "John William Vincent". Cool Antarctica. Archived from the original on 17 July 2012.
- Sir Ernest Shackleton (1999) [1919]. South. Great Britain: Penguin Books. ISBN 0-14-028886-4.
