= McNish =

McNish is a surname. Notable people with the surname include:

- Allan McNish (born 1969), racing driver
- Althea McNish, British textile designer from Trinidad
- Callum McNish (born 1992), English footballer
- Cliff McNish, fantasy author for young adults
- Courtney McNish, Trinidad and Tobago politician
- Harry McNish (1874–1930), the carpenter on Sir Ernest Shackleton's Imperial Trans-Antarctic Expedition of 1914–1917
- Ryan McNish (born 1981), lacrosse player for the Edmonton Rush in the National Lacrosse League

== See also ==
- Macnish, surname
- McNish Island, the larger of two islands lying at the east side of Cheapman Bay on the south side of South Georgia
