= Walter How =

English sailor (1885–1972)

- Born: Walter Ernest How; 25 December 1885; Bermondsey, London, England
- Died: 5 August 1972 (aged 86); London, England
- Military career
- Allegiance: United Kingdom
- Branch: British Merchant Navy
- Rank: Able seaman
- Expeditions: Imperial Trans-Antarctic

Walter Ernest How (25 December 1885 – 5 August 1972) was an English sailor, known for taking part in the Ernest Shackleton-led Imperial Trans-Antarctic Expedition from 1914 to 1917.

Born in Bermondsey, London, he became a sailor when he was 12 years old. He married Helen Varey in 1913, and his first daughter was born only six weeks before his departure on the Endurance.

When the Endurance made a stop at Buenos Aires en route to the Antarctica, How, along with William Bakewell, helped smuggle Perce Blackborow on board as a stowaway. After the Endurance sank, trapped in the sea ice around Antarctica, How was forced to survive upon the icebergs along with the rest of the crew. When they later used the three wooden lifeboats to row to Elephant Island, How was in the Stancomb Wills.

On return to England after their eventual rescue, How was awarded the Polar Medal and joined the Merchant Navy during the Great War.
