= Endurance (1912 ship) =

Ernest Shackleton's ship, 1914–1917

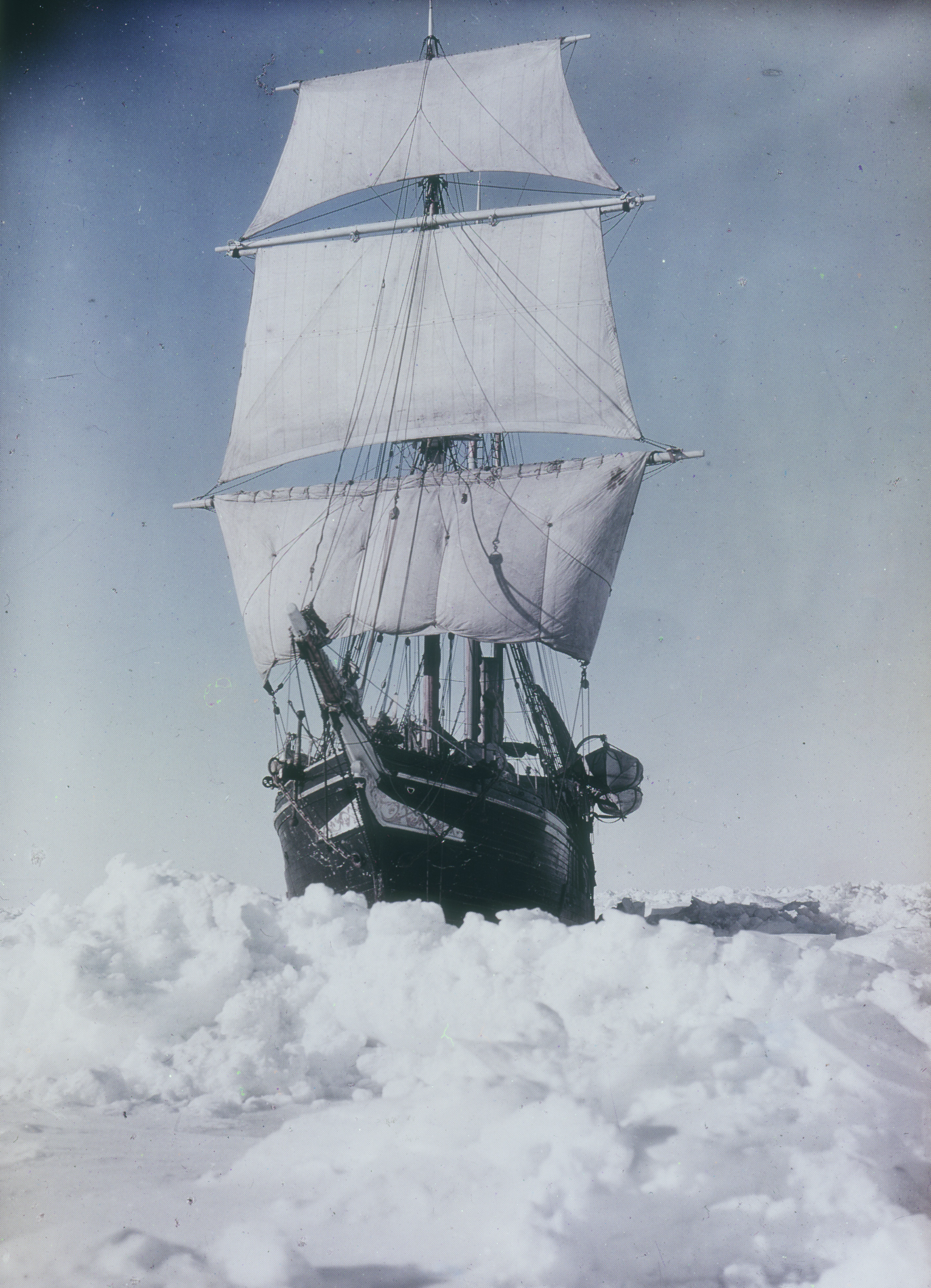
- Endurance under full sail trying to break through pack ice in the Weddell Sea on the Imperial Trans-Antarctic Expedition, 1915 Paget colour photograph by Frank Hurley.

History
- Name: Endurance
- Owner: Ernest Shackleton
- Builder: Framnæs shipyards, Sandefjord, Norway
- Launched: 17 December 1912; 113 years ago
- In service: 1912–1915
- Out of service: 27 October 1915; 111 years ago
- Fate: Sank following crush by pack ice on 21 November 1915
- Notes: Crushed and abandoned at: 75°23′S 42°14′W
- Wreck discovered: 5 March 2022, Weddell Sea 68°44′21″S 52°19′47″W

General characteristics
- Type: Barquentine
- Tonnage: 350 GRT
- Length: 144 ft (44 m)
- Beam: 25 ft (7.6 m)
- Propulsion: 350 hp (260 kW) Coal-fired steam and sail
- Speed: 10.2 kn (18.9 km/h; 11.7 mph)
- Complement: 28

Endurance was the three-masted barquentine in which Sir Ernest Shackleton and a crew of 27 men sailed for the Antarctic on the 1914–1917 Imperial Trans-Antarctic Expedition. The ship, originally named Polaris, was built at Framnæs shipyard and launched in 1912 from Sandefjord in Norway. When one of her commissioners, the Belgian Adrien de Gerlache, went bankrupt, the remaining one sold the ship for less than the shipyard had charged – but as Lars Christensen was the owner of Polaris, as well as of the yard, there was no hardship involved. The ship was bought by Shackleton in January 1914 for the expedition, which would be her first voyage. A year later, she became trapped in pack ice and finally sank in the Weddell Sea off Antarctica on 21 November 1915. All of the crew survived her sinking and were eventually rescued in 1916 after using the ship's boats to travel to Elephant Island and Shackleton, the ship's captain Frank Worsley, and four others made a voyage to seek help.

The wreck of Endurance was discovered on 5 March 2022, nearly 107 years after she sank, by the search team Endurance22. She lies 3,008 metres (9,869 ft; 1,645 fathoms) deep, and is in "a brilliant state of preservation". The wreck is designated as a protected historic site and monument under the Antarctic Treaty System.

== Design and construction ==
Designed by Ole Aanderud Larsen, Endurance was built at the Framnæs shipyard in Sandefjord, Norway. She was built under the supervision of master wood shipbuilder Christian Jacobsen, who was renowned for insisting that all men in his employment were not just skilled shipwrights but also experienced in seafaring aboard whaling or sealing ships. Every detail of her construction had been scrupulously planned to ensure maximum durability: for example, every joint and fitting was cross-braced for maximum strength.

The ship was launched on 17 December 1912 and was initially christened Polaris after the North Star. She was 144 ft (44 m) long, with a 25 ft (7.6 m) beam, and measured 350 tons gross. Her original purpose was to provide luxurious accommodation for small tourist and hunting parties in the Arctic as an ice-capable steam yacht. As launched she had 10 passenger cabins, a spacious dining saloon and galley (with accommodation for two cooks), a smoking room, a darkroom to allow passengers to develop photographs, electric lighting and even a small bathroom.

Though her hull looked from the outside like that of any other vessel of comparable size, it was not. She was designed for polar conditions with very sturdy construction. Her keel members were four pieces of solid oak, one above the other, adding up to a thickness of 85 in (2,200 mm), while her sides were between 30 in (760 mm) and 18 in (460 mm) thick, with twice as many frames as normal and the frames being of double thickness. She was built of planks of oak and Norwegian fir up to 30 in (760 mm) thick, sheathed in greenheart, an exceptionally strong and heavy wood. The bow, which was designed to meet the ice head-on, had been given special attention. Each timber had been made from a single oak tree chosen so that its natural shape followed the curve of the ship's design. When put together, these pieces had a thickness of 52 in (1,300 mm).

Of her three masts, the foremast was square-rigged, the mainmast and mizzenmast were both fore-and-aft rigged, making her a barquentine. As well as sails, Endurance had a 350 hp (260 kW) coal-fired steam engine, making the ship capable of speeds up to 10.2 kn (18.9 km/h; 11.7 mph).

At the time of her launch in 1912 Endurance was arguably the strongest wooden ship ever built with the possible exception of Fram, the vessel used by Fridtjof Nansen and later by Roald Amundsen. There was one major difference between the ships. Fram was bowl-bottomed, which meant that if the ice closed in against her, the ship would be squeezed up and out and not be subject to the pressure of the compressing ice. Endurance, on the other hand, was not intended to be frozen into heavy pack ice, and so was not designed to rise out of a crush. It was observed on the expedition that she instead tended to resist being crushed by floes until the ice cracked to relieve the pressure.

== Shackleton purchase ==
Polaris was originally built for the Belgian explorer Adrien de Gerlache and the Norwegian philanthropist Lars Christensen. Financial problems led to Gerlache pulling out of their partnership, leaving Christensen unable to pay the Framnæs yard the final amounts to hand over and outfit the ship. For over a year, Christensen attempted unsuccessfully to sell the ship, since her unique design as an ice-capable passenger-carrying ship, with relatively little space for stores and no cargo hold, made her useless to the whaling or sealing industries. Meanwhile, she was too big, slow and uncomfortable to be a private steam yacht. In the event, Christensen was happy to sell the ship to Ernest Shackleton in January 1914 for £14,000, which represented a significant loss to Christensen as it barely covered the outstanding payments to Framnæs, let alone the ship's total build costs. Author Alfred Lansing reports that he was happy "to take the loss in order to further the plans of an explorer of Shackleton's stature". Shackleton did not have the money at the time, but Christensen was eager for him to purchase the ship and paid the deposit himself. After Shackleton purchased the ship, she was rechristened Endurance after the Shackleton family motto, Fortitudine vincimus ("By endurance we conquer"). The ship was originally projected ready by mid-May, but completion was delayed for a month.

Shackleton had the ship relocated from Norway to London. She arrived at the Millwall Dock in the spring of 1914, and Shackleton gathered equipment, stores, finances, and crew until the end of July. The 'tween deck was converted into a cargo hold, and the crew made their quarters in the forecastle. The darkroom remained, abaft of the boiler. The refit also saw the ship repainted from white and gilt to black. She retained the large five-pointed star on her stern that had referred to her original name.

Her new equipment included three ship's boats. Two were 21 ft (6.4 m) transom-built rowing cutters purchased secondhand from the whaling industry. The third was a 22.5 ft (6.9 m) double-ended rowing whaleboat built for the expedition to specifications drawn up by Frank Worsley, Endurance's new captain. After her refit, Endurance began the short coastal journey to Plymouth on 1 August 1914, the day that Germany declared war on Russia.

To find crew for the Endurance, Shackleton reportedly placed an advertisement in The Times, reading:

Men wanted for hazardous journey. Small wages, bitter cold, long months of complete darkness, constant danger, safe return doubtful. Honour and recognition in case of success. (Note: When discussing the advertisement in his 1944 book Quit You Like Men, Carl Hopkins Elmore quoted Shackleton as saying that "so overwhelming was the response to his appeal that it seemed as though all the men of Great Britain were determined to accompany him." Although the advertisement was listed in Julian Watkins' The 100 Greatest Advertisements: 1852–1958, no trace has been found to date. Many sources have concluded that the story of Shackleton's advertisement is likely apocryphal. The crew did receive the recognition the supposed advertisement promised; in 2003 Time magazine deemed their voyage "the most storied epic of survival".)

Voyages to the Antarctic Circle in the 16 years prior to Endurance's purchase had been almost uniformly successful with only one vessel, the 30-year-old whaler Antarctic, having been crushed in the ice. With it being felt that little harm could come to a purpose-built ship in a sea in which ice halted all waves, Endurance became the first ship to be insured for her journey. All previous examples had their insurance end at the last port of call before their journey into the ice. Lloyd's of London and the Indemnity Marine Insurance Company underwrote Endurance at the value of £15,000.

== Voyage ==
Embarking on her maiden voyage, Endurance sailed from Plymouth on 8 August 1914 and set course for Buenos Aires, Argentina, under Worsley's command. Shackleton remained in Britain, finalising the expedition's organization and attending to some last-minute fundraising. This was Endurance's first major voyage following her completion and amounted to a shakedown voyage. Built for the ice, her hull was considered by many of her crew too rounded for the open ocean.

Shackleton took a steamer to Buenos Aires and caught up with his expedition a few days after Endurance's arrival. On 26 October 1914, Endurance sailed from Buenos Aires to what would be her last port of call, the whaling station at Grytviken on the island of South Georgia, where she arrived on 5 November. She left Grytviken on 5 December 1914, heading for the southern regions of the Weddell Sea.

Two days after leaving South Georgia, Endurance encountered polar pack ice and progress slowed to a crawl. For weeks Endurance worked her way through the pack, averaging less than 30 nmi (60 km) per day. By 15 January 1915, Endurance was within 200 nmi (370 km) of her destination, Vahsel Bay. By the following morning, heavy pack ice was sighted and in the afternoon a gale developed. Under these conditions it was soon evident that progress could not be made, and Endurance took shelter under the lee of a large grounded iceberg. During the next two days, Endurance moved back and forth under the sheltering protection of the berg. On 18 January, the gale began to moderate and Endurance set the topsail with the engine at slow. The pack had blown away. Progress was made slowly, until hours later Endurance encountered the pack once more. It was decided to move forward and work through the pack, and at 5:00 pm Endurance entered it. This ice was different from what had been encountered before, and the ship was soon amongst thick but soft brash ice, and became beset. The gale increased in intensity and kept blowing for another six days from a northerly direction towards land. By 24 January, the wind had completely compressed the ice in the Weddell Sea against the land, leaving Endurance icebound as far as the eye could see in every direction. All that could be done was to wait for a southerly gale to start pushing in the other direction, which would decompress and open the ice.

In the early morning of 24 January, a wide crack appeared in the ice 50 yards (46 m) ahead of the ship. Initially 15 ft (4.6 m) across but 1 mi (1.6 km) long, by mid-morning the next day the break was over 0.25 mi (0.40 km) wide, giving the men on the Endurance hope that the ice was breaking up. But the break never reached the ship itself, and despite three hours under full sail and full speed on the engine, the ship did not budge. Over the next days, the crew waited for the southerly gale to release the pressure on the ice, but while the wind backed to the hoped-for south/southwest direction, it remained light and erratic. Unseasonably low temperatures of around −2 °F (−19 °C) additionally kept the ice together. Occasional breaks in the ice were spotted, but none reached the ship and all closed up within a few hours.

On 14 February, an open channel of water opened up 0.25 mi (0.40 km) ahead of the ship and dawn showed the Endurance was afloat in a pool of soft, young ice no more than 2 ft (0.61 m) thick, but the pool was surrounded by solid pack ice of 12–18 ft (3.7–5.5 m) in thickness, blocking the path to the open lead. A day's continual work by the crew saw them hack a clear channel 150 yd (140 m) long. This work continued through the following day (15 February) and, with steam raised, the Endurance was backed up within her pool as far as possible to allow the ship to ram her way through the channel. As the ship went astern for successive attempts, lines were attached from the bow to loosened blocks of ice, estimated to weigh 20 tons (18 tonnes), in order to clear the path. The pool proved too small for the ship to gain enough momentum to successfully ram her way clear and by the end of the day the ice began to freeze up again. By 3:00 pm, the Endurance had made 200 yd (180 m) of distance through the ice, with 400 yd (370 m) still to go to clear water. Shackleton decided that the consumption of coal and manpower, and the risk of damage to the ship, was too great and called a halt.

=== Drift ===
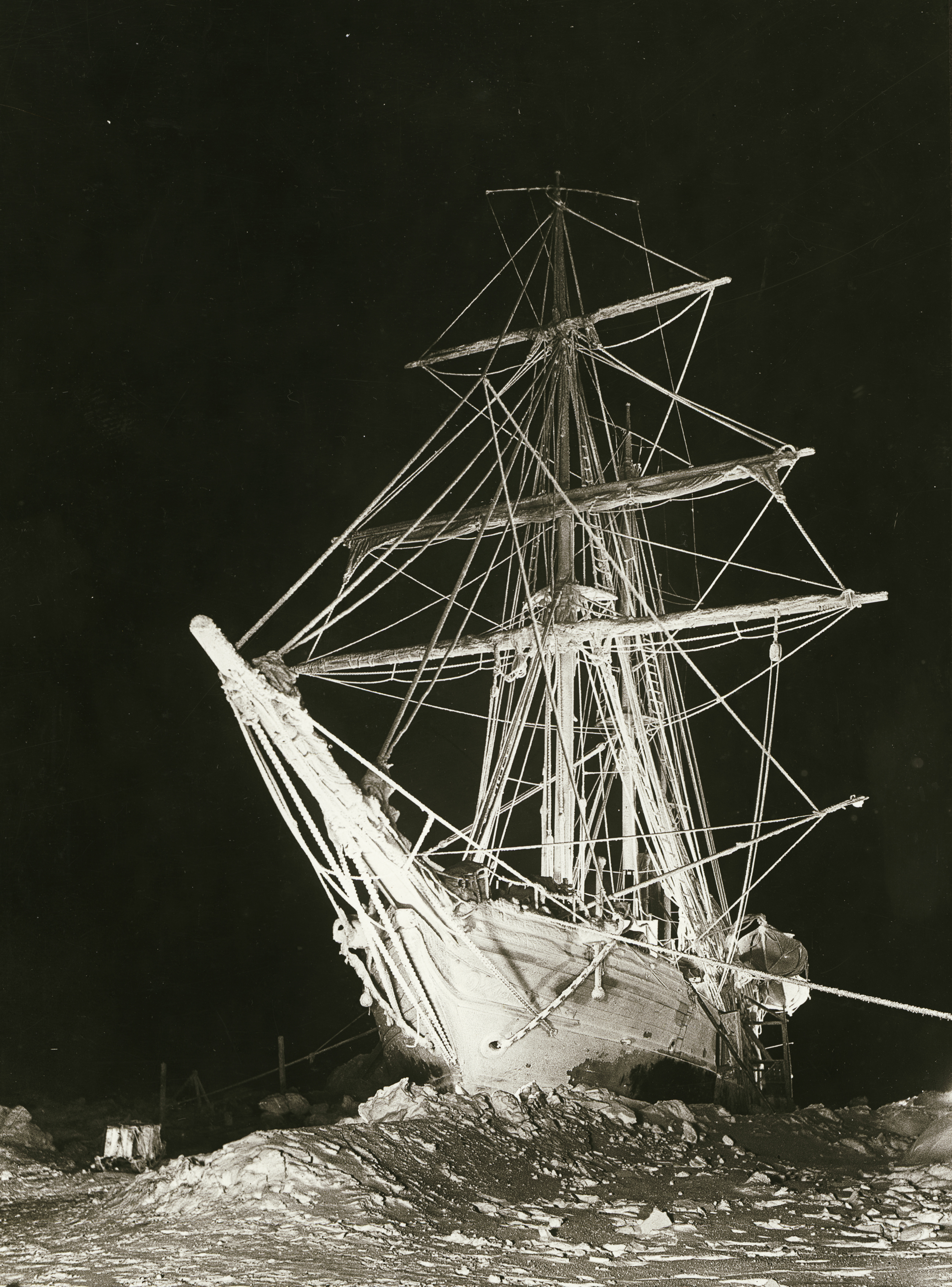
Shackleton's ship Endurance illuminated at night, 1915

After this frustration, Endurance's boilers were extinguished, committing the ship to drift with the ice until released naturally. On 17 February, the sun dipped below the horizon at midnight, showing the end of the Antarctic summer. On 24 February, regular watches on the ship were cancelled, with the Endurance now functioning as a shore station. The ship had slowly drifted south and at this point was within 60 mi (97 km) of the intended landing point at Vahsel Bay. But the icy terrain between the ship and the shore was too arduous to travel while carrying the materials and supplies needed for the overland expedition.

By March, navigational observation showed that the ship (and the mass of pack ice that contained her) was still moving, but now swinging towards the west-northwest and increasing in the speed of its drift, moving 130 mi (210 km) between the start of March and 2 May, when the sun disappeared below the horizon and the dark Antarctic winter began.

On 14 July 1915, Endurance was swept by a southwest gale, with wind speeds of 112 km/h (31 m/s; 70 mph), a barometer reading of 28.88 inHg (978 hPa) and temperatures falling to −33 °F (−36 °C). The blizzard continued until 16 July. This broke up the pack ice into smaller, individual floes, each of which began to move semi-independently under the force of the weather, while also clearing water in the north of the Weddell Sea. This provided a long fetch for the south-setting wind to blow over and then for the broken ice to pile up against itself while individual parts moved in different directions. This caused regions of intense localised pressure in the ice field. The ice began "working", with sounds of breaking and colliding ice audible to those on the ship through the next day. Breaks in the ice were spotted but none approached the ice holding the Endurance.

During July the ship drifted a further 160 mi (260 km) to the north. On the morning of 1 August, a pressure wave passed through the floe holding the ship, lifting the 400-ton Endurance bodily upwards and heeling the ship sharply to her port side before she dropped into a pool of water, afloat again for the first time in nearly six months. The broken sections of floe closed in around the ship on all sides, jarring the Endurance forward, backwards and sideways in violent fashion against the other slabs of ice. After over a quarter of an hour, a force from astern pushed the ship's bow up onto the floe, lifting the hull out of the pressure and with a list of five degrees to her port side. A gale overnight further disturbed the floe, driving it against the starboard side of the hull and forcing a sheet of ice upwards at a 45-degree angle until it reached the level of the scuppers. Despite the ordeal of the past few days, the ship remained undamaged.

Two pressure waves struck the ship on 29 August without incident. On the evening of 31 August, a slow-building pressure gripped the Endurance, causing her hull and timbers to creak and shudder continuously. The ice around the ship moved and broke throughout the night, battering the port side of the hull. All was quiet again until the afternoon of 30 September, by which time there were signs of spring with ten hours of sunlight per day and occasional temperature readings above freezing. A large floe was swept against the Endurance's port bow and then gripped that side of the ship against the built-up ice and snow on her starboard beam. The ship's structure groaned and wracked under the strain. Carpenter Harry McNish noted that the solid oak beams supporting the upper deck were being visibly bent "like a piece of cane". On deck the ship's masts were whipping back and forth as their stepping points on the keel were distorted. Despite these disconcerting signs, Worsley noted that the strength of the ship's structure was causing the ice itself to break up as it piled against the hull—"just as it appears she can stand no more, the huge floe weighing possibly a million tons or more yields to our little ship by cracking across ... and so relieves the pressure. The behaviour of our ship in the ice has been magnificent. Undoubtedly she is the finest little wooden vessel ever built". Despite this, the ship's decks were permanently buckled following this ordeal.

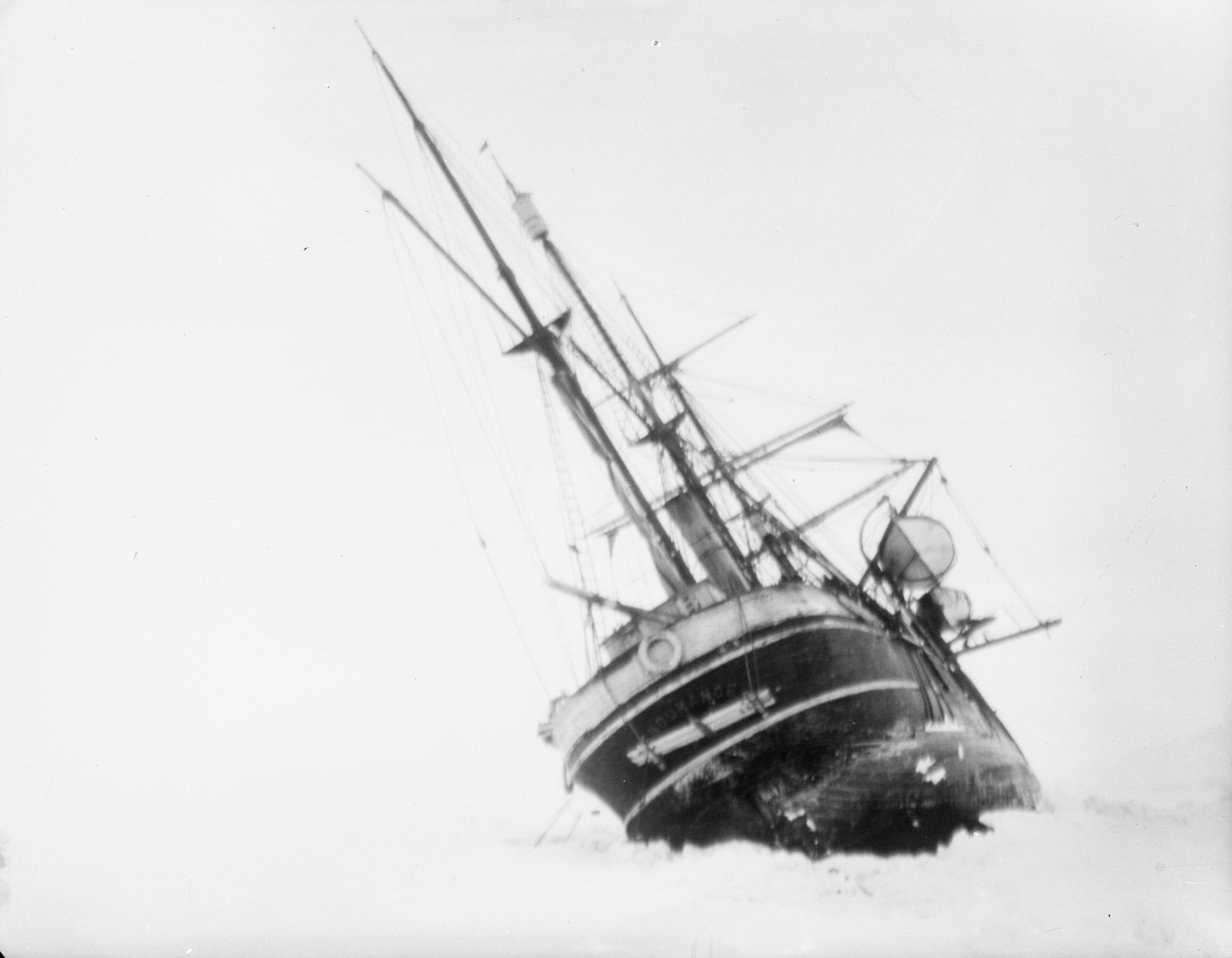
Endurance listing badly

=== Final destruction ===
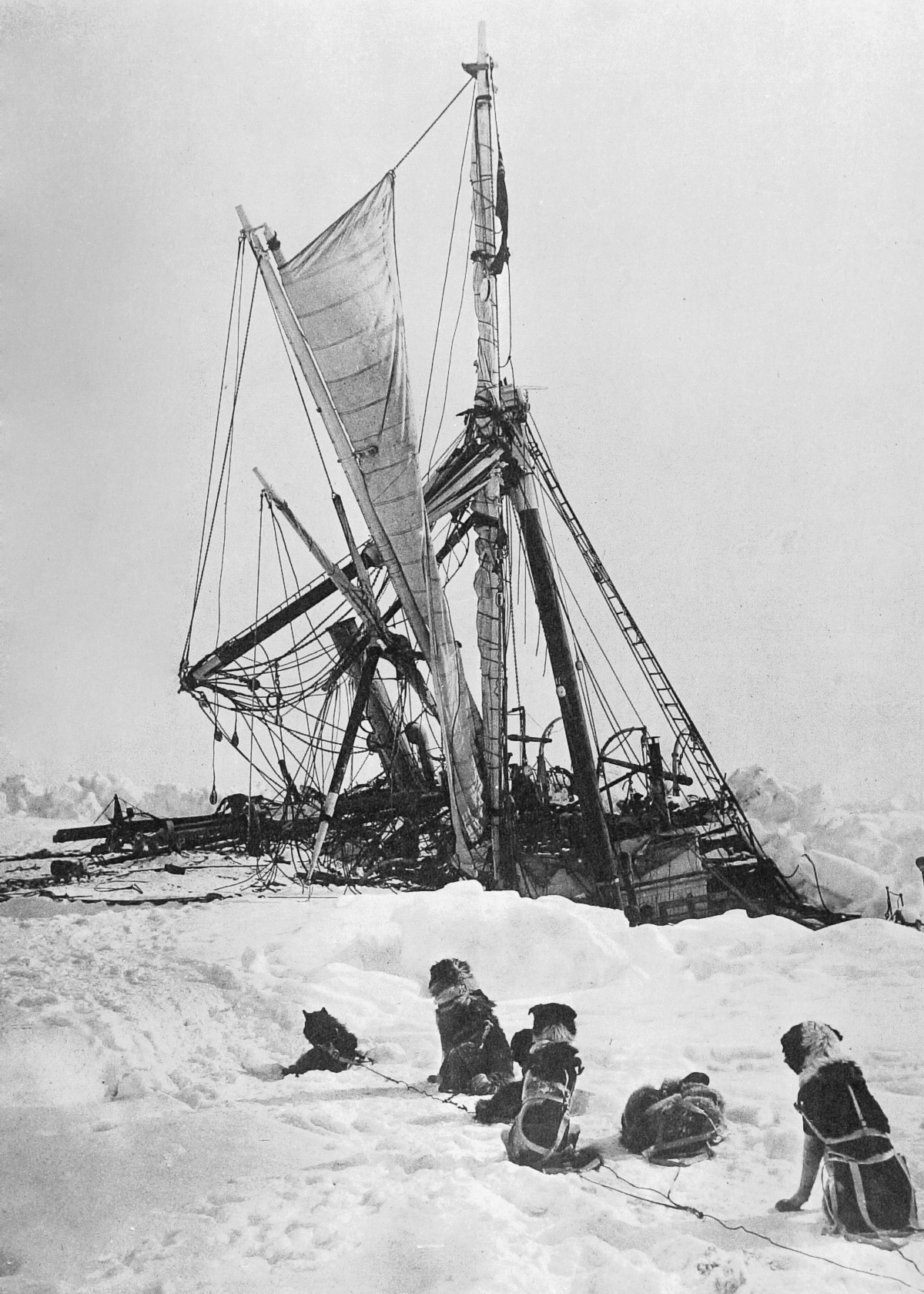
Endurance sinking, November 1915

By October, temperatures of up to nearly 29 °F (−2 °C) were recorded and the ice showed further signs of opening up. The floe against the ship's starboard broke up on 14 October, casting the Endurance afloat in a pool of open water for the first time in nine months.

On 16 October, Shackleton ordered steam to be raised so the ship could take advantage of any openings in the ice. It took nearly four hours for the boilers to be filled with freshwater melted from ice, and then a leak was discovered in one of the fittings and they had to be pumped out, repaired and then refilled. The following day a lead of open water was seen ahead of the ship. Only one boiler had been lit and there was insufficient steam to use the engine, so all the sails were set to try to force the ship into the loosening pack ice, but without success.

In the late afternoon of 18 October, the ice closed in around the Endurance once again. In just five seconds the ship was canted over to port by 20 degrees, and the list continued until she rested at 30 degrees, with the port bulwark resting on the pack and the boats on that side nearly touching the ice as they hung in their davits. After four hours in this position, the ice drew apart and the ship returned to a level keel.

The ice was relatively still for the rest of the month. On 20 October, steam was raised again and the engines tested. On 22 October, the temperature dropped sharply from 10 °F (−12 °C) to −14 °F (−26 °C) and the wind veered from southwest to northeast, and the next day, pressure ridges could be seen forming in the ice and moving near the ship.

On 24 October, the damaged ship was wracked by further pressure waves, pinning her between both floes. A large mass of ice slammed into the stern, tearing the sternpost away from the hull planking. Around the same time, the bow planking was stove in, causing simultaneous flooding in the engine room and the forward hold. Despite using both the portable manual pumps and getting up steam to drive the main bilge pumps, the water level continued to rise. The main man-powered deck pumps did not work, as their intakes had frozen and could only be restored by pouring buckets of boiling water onto the pump pipes from inside the coal bunkers and then playing a blowtorch over the intake valve. McNish constructed a cofferdam in the shaft tunnel to seal off the damaged stern area while the crew were arranged in spells of 15 minutes on, 15 minutes off on the main pump. After 28 hours of continuous work, the inflow of water had only been arrested—the ship was still badly flooded. At 9:00 pm, Shackleton ordered the ship's boats, stores and essential equipment to be moved onto the surrounding ice. The footplates in the engine room were pushed up and would no longer sit in place as the compartment was compressed. The planking of the ship's port side was bowing inwards by up to 6 in (15 cm).

Amid temperatures from −8.5 °F (−22.5 °C) in the morning to −16 °F (−27 °C) in the evening, Shackleton gave the order to abandon ship on 27 October at about 5:00 pm. The position at abandonment was 69° 05'S, 51° 30'W. During the course of the next day, parties were sent back to the ship to recover more supplies and stores. They found that the entire port side of the Endurance had been driven inwards and compressed, and the ice had entirely filled the bow and stern sections; only one of the six cabins had not been pierced by the floes. Shackleton wrote that the entire aft of the ship "had been crushed concertina fashion", the forward motor engine was pushed into the galley, and gasoline cans stacked on deck were pushed through the deckhouse wall halfway into the wardroom. The ship's Blue Ensign was hoisted up her mizzen mast so that she would, in Shackleton's word's, "go down with colours flying".

After a failed attempt to man-haul the boats and stores overland on sledges, Shackleton realised the effort was much too intense and that the party would have to camp on the ice until it carried them to the north and broke up. More parties were sent back to the Endurance, still with her masts and rigging intact and all but her bow above the ice, to salvage any remaining items. By then, two days after abandoning her, the ship was submerged up to the forecastle. A large portion of the provisions had been left on the submerged lower deck. The only way to retrieve them was to cut through the main deck, which was more than a foot thick in places and itself under three feet of water. Some crates and boxes floated up once a hole had been cut, while others were retrieved with a grapple. In total, nearly 3.5 tons of stores were recovered from the wrecked ship.

The party was still camped under 2 mi (3.2 km) from the remains of the Endurance on 8 November when Shackleton returned to the ship to consider further salvage. By now the ship had sunk a further 18 in (46 cm) into the ice and the upper deck was now almost level with the ice. The interior of the ship was almost full of compacted ice and snow, making further work impossible.

External videos
- The end of Endurance, 1915, YouTube video

On 13 November, a new pressure wave swept through the pack ice. The forward topgallant mast and topmasts collapsed as the bow was finally crushed. These moments were recorded on film by expedition photographer Frank Hurley. The mainmast was split near its base and shortly afterwards the mainmast and the mizzen mast broke and collapsed together, with this also filmed by Hurley.

In the late afternoon of 21 November, movement of the remaining wreckage was noticed as another pressure wave hit. Within the space of a minute, the stern of the Endurance was lifted clear of the ice as the floes moved together and then, as the pressure passed and they moved apart, the entire wreck fell into the ocean. The ice surrounding the spot where the Endurance had sunk immediately moved together again, obliterating any trace of the wreck. Worsley recorded the position as 68°39′30″ S, 52°26′30″ W but had been unable to obtain a sextant sight at the time and based the position on that of Ocean Camp at noon the following day.

== Aftermath ==
The crew remained camped on the ice in the hopes that the floe would bring them closer to one of various islands. In April 1916, they set off in the Endurance's three ship's boats and eventually landed on Elephant Island. Because the island was remote and rarely visited, Shackleton decided that help needed to be sought. On 24 April, he, Worsley, and four others began a voyage in a ship's boat, named James Caird, for South Georgia. After reaching South Georgia, Shackleton worked on arranging a rescue mission for those left on Elephant Island. Shackleton and Worsley made multiple voyages in different vessels that were unable to get through the ice to reach them.

On 9 June the Navy of Uruguay launched a rescue mission under command of lieutenant Ruperto Elichiribehety with a modified iron steamboat, the expedition picked up Shackleton in Stanley and reached 20 nautical miles from Elephant Island, but was unable to land because of the ice barrier and was forced to return unsuccessful.

The fourth attempt was made in the ill-suited Yelcho (lent by the Chilean government) and was successful. Despite the uncertainty of travel conditions (such as the vessel having no radio or double hull), all of the twenty-two members of the crew who had remained on Elephant Island were safely rescued on 30 August 1916 – 128 days after Shackleton had left in James Caird.

The actual retrieval of the men from the beach was done as quickly as possible, before the ice closed in again. But, even in that haste, care was taken to collect all the records and photographs of the expedition, as these gave the only hope of Shackleton paying the expenses of the failed expedition. Meanwhile, Yelcho's commander Luis Pardo was quickly regarded as a national hero in Chile, with the British government granting him a large monetary award, which he turned down.

== Wreck ==
Photograph of Endurance as found by Endurance22

In 1998, wreckage found at Stinker Point on the southwestern side of Elephant Island was incorrectly identified as flotsam from the ship. It instead was from the 1877 wreck of the Connecticut sealing ship Charles Shearer. In 2001, wreck hunter David Mearns unsuccessfully planned an expedition to find the wreck of Endurance. By 2003, two rival groups were making plans for an expedition to find the wreck, but no expedition was mounted at the time.

In 2010, Mearns announced a new plan to search for the wreck. The plan was sponsored by the National Geographic Society but was subject to finding sponsorship for the balance of the US$10 million estimated cost. A 2013 study by Adrian Glover of the Natural History Museum, London correctly suggested the Antarctic Circumpolar Current could preserve the wreck on the seabed by keeping wood-boring "ship worms" away. A Weddell Sea Expedition to locate and possibly photograph the wreck using long-range autonomous underwater vehicles (AUVs) was underway in the Antarctic summer of 2018–2019. This expedition failed when the researchers' AUV was lost to the ice.

Having examined Frank Worsley's original log books housed at the Canterbury Museum, Christchurch, New Zealand, and closely studied his navigational methods, Lars Bergman and Robin Stuart published an analysis of the wreck's likely position relative to the position given in the log.

Experts speculated that the wreck rested on flat terrain at around 3,000 metres (9,800 ft; 1,600 fathoms), undisturbed by massive sediment deposition and little to no erosion. According to Julian Dowdeswell of the Scott Polar Research Institute, the known conditions on the sea bed suggested that Endurance should not be damaged and that she would likely be in the same state as she was when she sank in the pack ice in 1915. He also noted that any future attempts at finding the Endurance would be "add-ons" to other main scientific expeditions to the area, such as the one in 2019, which was launched chiefly to study the melting and retreat of the Larsen ice shelves.

In July 2021, the Falklands Maritime Heritage Trust announced Endurance22, a new expedition to search for the wreck of Endurance that would launch in early 2022 using Saab submersible technology. If found, the wreck would not be disturbed, but instead scanned in 3D.

On 7 February 2022 Lars Bergman, David Mearns and Robin Stuart released a preprint of their paper on the navigation of Endurance, which had been previously submitted to the Journal of Navigation in July 2021. The paper was based upon a re-analysis of the original lunar occultation timings made by Frank Worsley and Reginald W. James, the expedition physicist, using modern lunar ephemerides and catalogues of star positions, which allowed the authors to refine the predicted sinking position of Endurance. According to the authors their latest paper is "a more complete, accurate and reliable basis for determining the most probable sinking location of Endurance". David Mearns delivered the 2022 EGR Taylor Lecture on their analysis and the final paper appeared online on 21 February 2023. Bergman, Mearns and Stuart were awarded a special Certificate of Achievement by the Royal Institute of Navigation "in recognition of their pioneering data analysis and modelling leading to the successful location of Endurance's wreck".

=== Discovery ===
Discovery site of Endurance

The wreck of Endurance was discovered on 5 March 2022. Endurance22 announced, in a 9 March 2022 press release, that they had found the wreck in the Weddell Sea at a depth of 3,008 metres (9,869 ft; 1,645 fathoms). Although the wreck's position was initially described as being about 4 miles (6.4 km; 3.5 nmi) south of Worsley's original calculated location, the true position was later revealed to be 68°44′21″ S, 52°19′47″ W which is 4.9 nautical miles (5.6 mi; 9.1 km) South, 2.4 nautical miles (2.8 mi; 4.4 km) East (5.4 nautical miles (6.2 mi; 10.0 km) total distance) of the position given in the log. Mensun Bound, the expedition's director of exploration, said that Worsley's navigational skills had helped the expedition find the wreck; his historic "detailed records were invaluable". Additionally, sea ice, which covers the Weddell Sea year-round and has historically been so thick as to make underwater exploration nearly impossible, was recorded as being at its lowest levels around Antarctica since space satellite records began being kept in the 1970s.

The discoverers on board the South African research vessel S. A. Agulhas II said that the wreck was in remarkably good condition, and that they had filmed and photographed it extensively, including with ultra-high-definition 3D scanning. The name Endurance on the stern remains clearly legible. In keeping with the team's promise, they did not salvage any part of the wreck or of its contents, as the ship came under the definition of a protected historic site and monument as set forth in the Antarctic Treaty System. A legal protection perimeter around the wreck is being widened from 500m to 1,500m.

The search for the Endurance and its discovery were able to be followed by students around the world, thanks to the efforts of the expedition's educational partner, Reach the World. Reach the World conducted live streams, created educational resources, and published informational updates at regular intervals before, during, and after the expedition.

The 2025 Goodwood Future Lab event included a 1.5 metres (4 ft 11 in) 3D-printed exhibit of Endurance as part of the Seabed 2030 project.

== Crew ==
The crew of Endurance on her final voyage was made up of the 28 men, including Sir Ernest Shackleton, listed below. They were accompanied by Mrs Chippy, a male ship's cat, and originally sixty-nine sledge dogs with additional litters of puppies born during the expedition. After the Endurance became trapped in pack ice and was destroyed, Shackleton decided that Mrs Chippy and some of the younger dogs would not survive and had to be shot.

- Sir Ernest Shackleton, expedition leader
- Frank Wild, second-in-command
- Frank Worsley, captain and navigator
- Lionel Greenstreet, first officer
- Tom Crean, second officer
- Alfred Cheetham, third officer
- Hubert Hudson, navigator
- Lewis Rickinson, engineer
- Alexander Kerr, engineer
- Alexander Macklin, surgeon
- James McIlroy, surgeon
- Sir James Wordie, geologist
- Leonard Hussey, meteorologist
- Reginald James, physicist
- Robert Clark, biologist
- Frank Hurley, photographer
- George Marston, artist
- Thomas Orde-Lees, motor expert and storekeeper
- Harry "Chippy" McNish, carpenter
- Charles Green, cook
- Walter How, able seaman
- William Bakewell, able seaman
- Timothy McCarthy, able seaman
- Thomas McLeod, able seaman
- John Vincent, boatswain
- Ernest Holness, stoker
- William Stephenson, stoker
- Perce Blackborow, steward

== Legacy ==
Two Antarctic patrol ships of the Royal Navy have been named Endurance in honour of Shackleton's ship. The first HMS Endurance, launched in May 1956 and given the pennant number A171 sometime later, served as an ice patrol and hydrographic survey ship until 1986. The second HMS Endurance was bought from Norway in 1991, where she had been named MV Polar Circle. After initially keeping that name, she was renamed Endurance, serving as an icebreaker. The SpaceX Crew Dragon Endurance was named in part in honour of the ship. In 2021, Lindblad Expeditions in conjunction with National Geographic launched the Endurance, a polar cruise ship named in honour of Shackleton's voyage.

LEGO released a set based on the Endurance for Black Friday, 29 November 2024.

== See also ==
- List of Antarctic exploration ships from the Heroic Age, 1897–1922
