= Ole Aanderud Larsen =

Norwegian engineer

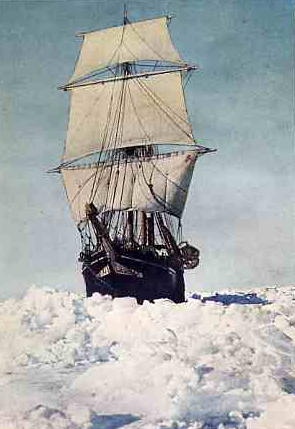
Endurance

Ole Aanderud Larsen (18 December 1884 – 6 October 1964) was a ship designer and businessman from Norway.

Larsen was born in Tønsberg and died in Sandefjord, in the county of Vestfold. Larsen is best known for designing the Endurance, the three-masted barquentine in which Sir Ernest Shackleton sailed for the Antarctic on the Imperial Trans-Antarctic Expedition in 1914.

Larsen was the first chairman and one of the founders of Jotun Group Private Ltd., a company started by Odd Gleditsch to sell specialized paints and coatings to the shipping industry. Jotun has since expanded worldwide and now sells a diverse range of paints and coatings for all kind of industries.

== Related reading ==
- Lansing, Alfred. (1999) 2nd ed. Endurance: Shackleton's Incredible Voyage (Carroll & Graf Publishers) ISBN 0-7867-0621-X
