= Macnish =

Macnish is a surname. Notable people with the surname include:

- Andrew Macnish (born 1965), Australian footballer
- David MacNish (1812–1863), New Zealand interpreter
- Donald Macnish (1841–1927), Ontario politician
- John Macnish (born 1956), British television producer
- Robert Macnish (1802–1837), Scottish surgeon and philosopher
- William Macnish (1842–1873), Australian cricketer

== See also ==
- McNish, surname
