= Ken Drury =

Scottish actor

- Born: Ken Drury; 7 June 1950 (age 75); Rochford, Essex, England
- Occupation: Actor

Ken Drury (born 7 June 1950) is a British actor.

== Career ==
Drury's career in TV has seen him play the midwife in Only Fools and Horses and Harry McNish, the carpenter of Ernest Shackleton in Shackleton opposite Kenneth Branagh.
