= Frank Worsley =

New Zealand sailor and explorer (1872–1943)

Frank Arthur Worsley DSO* OBE RD
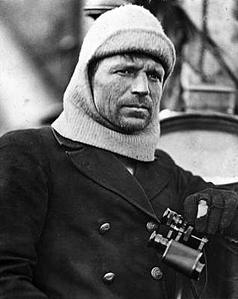
- Worsley c. 1914/1916
- Born: 22 February 1872; Akaroa, New Zealand
- Died: 1 February 1943 (aged 70); Claygate, England
- Military career
- Allegiance: New Zealand
- Branch: Royal Navy Reserve
- Service years: 1902–1920
- Rank: Lieutenant Commander
- Commands: PC.61; HMS Pangloss; HMS Cricket; HMS M24
- Conflicts: First World War; North Russia Intervention; Second World War
- Awards: Distinguished Service Order & Bar; Officer of the Order of the British Empire; Polar Medal; Order of Saint Stanislaus (Imperial Russia)
- Other work: Polar explorer Author; Merchant Navy

Frank Arthur Worsley DSO* OBE RD (22 February 1872 – 1 February 1943) was a New Zealand sailor and explorer who served on Ernest Shackleton's Imperial Trans-Antarctic Expedition of 1914–1916, as captain of Endurance. He also served in the Royal Navy Reserve during the First World War.

Born in Akaroa, New Zealand, Worsley joined the New Zealand Shipping Company in 1888. He served aboard several vessels running trade routes between New Zealand, England and the South Pacific. While on South Pacific service, he was known for his ability to navigate to tiny, remote islands. He joined the Royal Navy Reserve in 1902 and served on HMS Swiftsure for a year before returning to the Merchant navy. In 1914, he joined the Imperial Trans-Antarctic Expedition, which aimed to cross the Antarctic continent.

After the expedition's ship Endurance was trapped in pack ice and wrecked, he and the rest of the crew sailed three lifeboats to Elephant Island, off the Antarctic Peninsula. From there, Worsley, Shackleton and four others sailed the 6.9m (22.5-foot) lifeboat James Caird 1,300 km (800 miles) across the stormy South Atlantic Ocean to their intended destination, South Georgia. Worsley's navigation skills were crucial to the safe arrival of the James Caird. Shackleton, Worsley and seaman Tom Crean then trekked for 36 hours through snow, ice and mountains to fetch help from Stromness whaling station. In August, Worsley and Shackleton returned to Elephant Island aboard the Yelcho, a Chilean naval ship, to rescue the remaining members of the expedition, all of whom survived.

During the First World War, Worsley captained the Q-ship PC.61 when it rammed and sank the German U-boat UC-33, killing all but one of its crew. For this action Worsley was awarded the Distinguished Service Order (DSO). Later in the war he worked in transportation of supplies in Arctic Russia, and in the North Russia Intervention against the Bolsheviks, earning a bar to his DSO. He was later appointed an Officer of the Order of the British Empire. From 1921 to 1922, he served on Shackleton's last expedition to the Antarctic as captain of the Quest. In between berths in the Merchant Navy, he led an expedition to the Arctic Circle and participated in a treasure hunt on Cocos Island. He wrote several books relating to his experiences in polar exploration and his sailing career.

During the Second World War, Worsley initially served with the International Red Cross in France and Norway. In 1941, he falsified his age so he could rejoin the Merchant Navy. When officials discovered his actual age, he was released from duty. He died from lung cancer in England in 1943.

== Early life ==
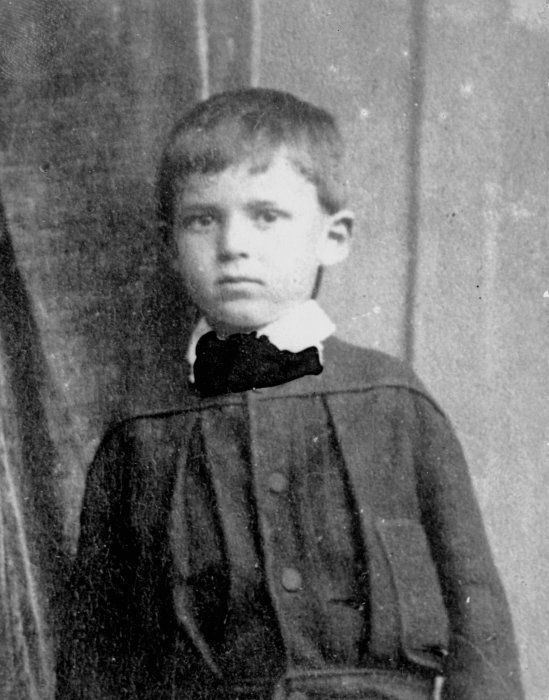
Worsley as a child

Frank Arthur Worsley was born on 22 February 1872 in Akaroa, New Zealand, one of three children of a farmer, Henry Worsley, and his wife Georgiana. His father arrived in New Zealand from England as a child; his grandfather, Henry Francis Worsley (1806–1876), migrated from Rugby, England aboard the Cornwall to Lyttelton, where he arrived with his large family, in December 1851. The family lived in Grehan Valley, high above Akaroa. Worsley's mother died while he was a toddler. He was sent to school in Akaroa but when his father moved his family to take up work clearing bush from land at Peraki, he was homeschooled for a time. From age 10, he helped with clearing land for sheep pasture and growing cocksfoot. When Frank was 11, his older brother, Harry, left to join the New Zealand Shipping Company as an apprentice and at about the same time, his father moved his family, which was now just Frank and his 13-year-old sister, to Christchurch. Frank attended Fendalton School and marked his final year of schooling by being made head boy.

Like his brother, Frank was interested in a career at sea. In 1887, his application to join the New Zealand Shipping Company was declined because of his short stature, but he was successful six months later. He was signed on as a junior midshipman aboard the Wairoa, a three-masted clipper which transported wool to London.

== Maritime career ==
Worsley served on a number of sailing ships of the company, running the trade route between New Zealand and England for several years. He became a third mate by 1891, and then a fifth officer the following year. In 1895, when a third officer, he left the New Zealand Shipping Company to join the New Zealand Government Steamer Service (NZGSS). His first posting was aboard the Tutanekai, an NZGSS steamer which served the Pacific Islands, as second mate. He was considered to be a good and experienced officer, but was not averse to mischief. On one voyage in 1899, the Tutanekai was anchored in the harbour at Apia, the capital city of German Samoa. At night, Worsley went ashore and stole the ensign that was flown from the flagpole of the German consulate on the harbour front. On discovering the theft, the consul suspected the culprit was from the crew of the Tutanekai, the only merchant vessel in the harbour at the time. With a party of sailors from SMS Falke, also anchored in the harbour, the consul boarded the Tutanekai looking for the ensign, but they left empty-handed after the ship's captain protested. Even when the captain later found out Worsley was responsible, it did not affect his career prospects. He was posted to the Hinemoa, another NZGSS steamer, as chief officer.

In June 1900, Worsley sat the examination for a foreign master's certificate. He passed with good marks, and was one of two students commended for their efforts. He was now a qualified master and, as his first command, was given the Countess of Ranfurly. This was a three-masted schooner of the NZGSS which sailed trade routes in the South Pacific, mainly around the Cook Islands and Niue, both of which were New Zealand dependencies. Beatrice Grimshaw, a travel writer based in Papua New Guinea, said that "Any passenger he took had to work passage as well as pay" and that he encouraged her to learn practical seamanship, "to go aloft, to "hand, reef and steer", and to use the sixteen-foot oar in the whaleboat".

=== Royal Navy Reserve ===
While in command of the Countess of Ranfurly, Worsley joined the Royal Navy Reserve (RNR) and on 1 January 1902 was appointed a sub-lieutenant. In 1904, Countess of Ranfurly was sold, leaving Worsley without a command. Rather than stay in the employ of the New Zealand Government Steamer Service, he decided to look abroad for work. He travelled to Sydney and found a berth as chief officer on HMS Sparrow, which was on its delivery voyage to New Zealand, having been recently purchased by the New Zealand Government. When the Sparrow arrived in Wellington in March 1905, he was selected to command the ship while it was converted to a training vessel. The conversion was still incomplete when he left for England in early 1906.

On arrival in England in March 1906, Worsley presented himself for further training in the RNR. He was posted to HMS Psyche and received specialist training in torpedoes, gunnery and navigation. He was promoted to lieutenant the following May. He served on a number of Royal Navy ships over the next two years, including 12 months on HMS Swiftsure. He then returned to the Merchant navy and found a position with Allan Line Royal Mail Steamers, which sailed regularly from England to Canada and South America. He would intermittently be called up for service in the RNR over the next several years. This included a month in 1911 spent aboard HMS New Zealand.

== Imperial Trans-Antarctic Expedition ==
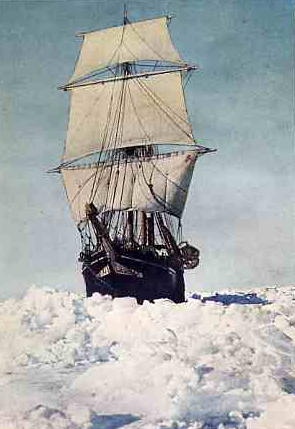
Endurance in full sail, c. 1915

In 1914, the explorer Ernest Shackleton began preparing an expedition which had the goal of completing the first crossing of the Antarctic continent. The failure of Robert Falcon Scott to beat the Norwegian Roald Amundsen to the South Pole in 1911 was considered a blot on Britain's reputation in polar exploration. Shackleton's expedition was intended to return the country to the forefront of Antarctic endeavour. He set up his headquarters at Burlington Road in London and interviewed candidates for the expedition. One position was as captain for the expedition's vessel, the Endurance.

Worsley, in London awaiting a new berth, joined the expedition as a result of a dream in which he navigated a ship around icebergs drifting down Burlington Street. He took it as a premonition and the next day hurried down to Burlington Street, where he noticed a sign on a building advertising what Shackleton called the Imperial Trans-Antarctic Expedition. He entered the building and met Shackleton. After a few minutes of conversation, Shackleton offered him the captaincy of the Endurance, which Worsley accepted.

The Endurance left England on 8 August 1914 destined for Buenos Aires, where Shackleton, travelling separately, would later meet the expedition. The departure was troubled by the impending outbreak of the First World War. Some members, including Worsley, anticipating being called up for military service, proposed a postponement of the voyage. However, the Admiralty advised Shackleton to proceed with his plans even after Britain declared war on Imperial Germany on 4 August. Just prior to the departure of the Endurance, Worsley approached the authorities and was advised that RNR personnel were not being called up at the time. While steaming to South America, fuel ran low and wood intended for planned buildings at the expedition's base in Antarctica was used to keep the engine running. Worsley ran a relatively relaxed ship with little discipline or control of alcohol consumption. Four crew members got into a barroom brawl at a stopover in Madeira, a neutral port. While anchored in the harbour, a neighbouring German ship swung into the Endurance, damaging it. Worsley angrily boarded the German ship with some other members of the expedition and forced the crew to repair the damage.

Shackleton, briefed on Worsley's handling of the voyage to date once he had caught up with the expedition at Buenos Aires, began to have concerns about his choice of captain. Worsley was to be in command of the resupply expedition for the party that was to winter over in Antarctica, but Shackleton began to doubt whether his leadership skills were sufficient to achieve this. After resupplying at Buenos Aires, the Endurance left for the remote island of South Georgia, in the South Atlantic, on 26 October. It duly arrived at Grytviken Station, a Norwegian whaling outpost, on 5 November. The Norwegians confirmed initial reports from Buenos Aires that the Antarctic pack ice was much further north than usual. Shackleton followed the Norwegians' advice to delay departure until later in the summer, and it was not until 5 December that the Endurance steamed south for the Weddell Sea.

=== Icebound ===
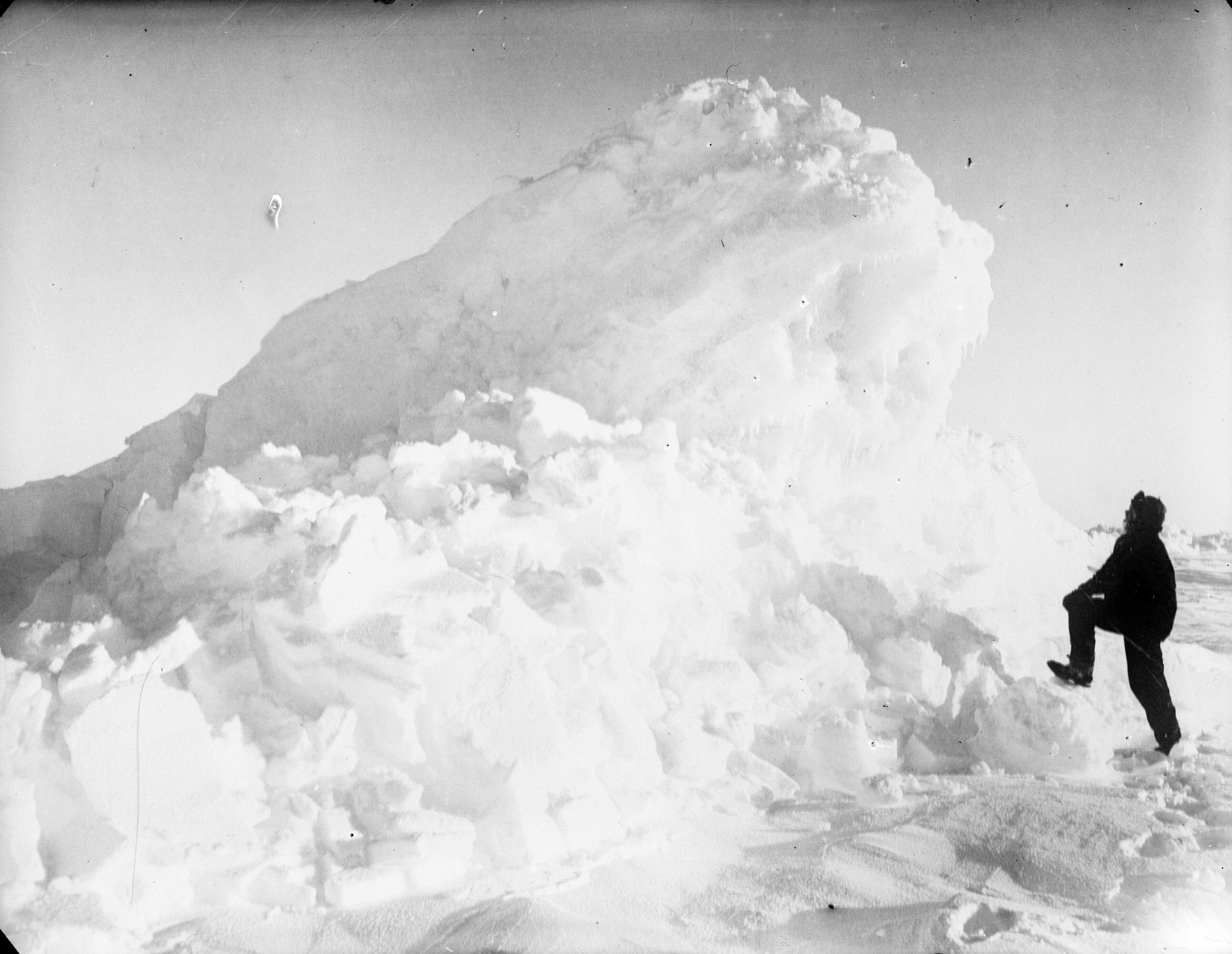
Worsley alongside a large pressure ridge on the ice, August 1915

The Endurance encountered the pack ice three days after leaving South Georgia, and Worsley began working the ship through the various bergs. On occasion it was necessary to ram a path through the ice. Progress was intermittent; on some days little headway was made while on other days large stretches of open water allowed swift passage southwards. Worsley would often direct the helmsman from the crow's nest, from where he could see any breaks in the ice. During this time Shackleton came to think that Worsley was less suited to giving orders than to following them, which he would do with the utmost determination.

On 18 January 1915, the ship became iced in. Within a few days, it was apparent that the Endurance was held fast and was likely to remain so for the upcoming winter. Trapped, the ship slowly drifted westwards with the ice, and the expedition settled in for the winter. The original plan had been to leave a shore party on the Antarctic mainland while Worsley took the Endurance northwards. There had been no expectation that the entire expedition would live aboard the ship in the long term. Worsley relished the challenge; he slept in the passageway rather than the cabins, and even in the depths of winter, would shock his companions by taking snow baths on the ice. With little to do since the Endurance became trapped, he occupied himself taking soundings of the ocean and collecting specimens. He later wrote a report titled Biological, Soundings and Magnetic Record, Weddell Sea, 1914–1916.

By July, it was becoming obvious that the ice was likely to crush the Endurance, which creaked and trembled under the pressure, and Shackleton instructed Worsley to be prepared to quickly abandon ship if the need arose. Worsley was initially incredulous, asking Shackleton: "You seriously mean to tell me that the ship is doomed?" Shackleton responded, "The ship can't live in this, Skipper." Finally, on 24 October, the pressure of the ice caused the sternpost of the Endurance to twist and the ship began to quickly let in water. After desperate attempts to fix the leak and pump the ship dry, Shackleton gave the order to abandon ship three days later. Salvaging what essential supplies they could, the expedition set out on 30 October for Robertson Island, 320 km (200 miles) to the northeast. After just three days, it was clear that the condition of the ice was too rough for sledging. Having travelled only a 2.4 km (1.5 miles) from where the Endurance was sinking, they set up camp to wait for the ice to break up. Lumber and tents were salvaged from the crushed ship, which was still not fully submerged, and a reasonable camp, known as Ocean Camp, was established. The expedition stayed here for two months until 23 December, when they struck camp.

Sketch map indicating (in green and blue) the general route of the James Caird on the first and second legs of its journey

The conditions underfoot were slushy during the day, as the temperature warmed up. Shackleton resolved to do most of the trekking at night, sledging the three lifeboats of the Endurance behind them. The sledging was hard work and after little more than a week, Shackleton and his men were forced to camp once more. Underneath, the ice continued to move northwards, and by April 1916, the floe they were on was nearly within sight of Elephant Island but beginning to break up. Shackleton ordered the expedition to the lifeboats, placing Worsley in charge of one of them, the Dudley Docker. It took a week to reach Elephant Island, the ice and currents inhibiting progress.

The first few nights involved camping on nearby ice floes with the constant risk of them breaking up, but the last four nights were in the boats, with Worsley spending most of it at the tiller and going without sleep for 90 hours straight. His experience with open boats came to the fore in his sound handling of the Dudley Docker, while his navigation was exemplary, guiding the fleet of lifeboats unerringly to Elephant Island once they found favourable wind conditions. On the final night at sea, with Elephant Island having been sighted earlier in the day, heavy seas separated his boat from the other two lifeboats. His boat taking on water and caught in a rip, Worsley steered the Dudley Docker all through the night. Relieved early in the morning, he promptly fell asleep and could only be awoken by kicks to the head; it was only three years later that he found out the method used to wake him up. The Dudley Docker made shore on 15 April, landing on the same shingle beach of Elephant Island as the other lifeboats. It was the expedition's first landfall in almost 18 months.

=== Voyage of the James Caird ===
It quickly became apparent that Elephant Island, 32 km (20 miles) of rock and ice with little shelter, was not a welcoming environment with winter approaching and most of the expedition members weakened by their ordeal. Furthermore, the expedition could not be expected to be spotted by search parties or passing whalers. Within days of landing on Elephant Island, Shackleton decided to take a small party and sail the largest lifeboat, the James Caird, named for one of the expedition's sponsors, to South Georgia, 1300 km (800 miles) away. From there he would obtain a ship and return for the remainder of his men. Worsley, whose navigational skills had impressed Shackleton, volunteered to accompany him. The James Caird, originally built to Worsley's specifications, was about 6.7m (22 feet) long and the expedition's carpenter, Harry McNish, immediately set about improving its seaworthiness. On 24 April, the weather dawned clear and after being provisioned with 30 days of supplies, the boat left Elephant Island. Worsley was faced with the task of navigating the Southern Ocean to South Georgia. There was no margin for error as the James Caird would sail into the South Atlantic if he missed the island; this would mean almost certain death for those in the lifeboat, as well as for those remaining on Elephant Island. Fortuitously, the weather was fine on the day of departure from the island and this allowed Worsley to obtain a sun sighting to ensure that his chronometer was rated.

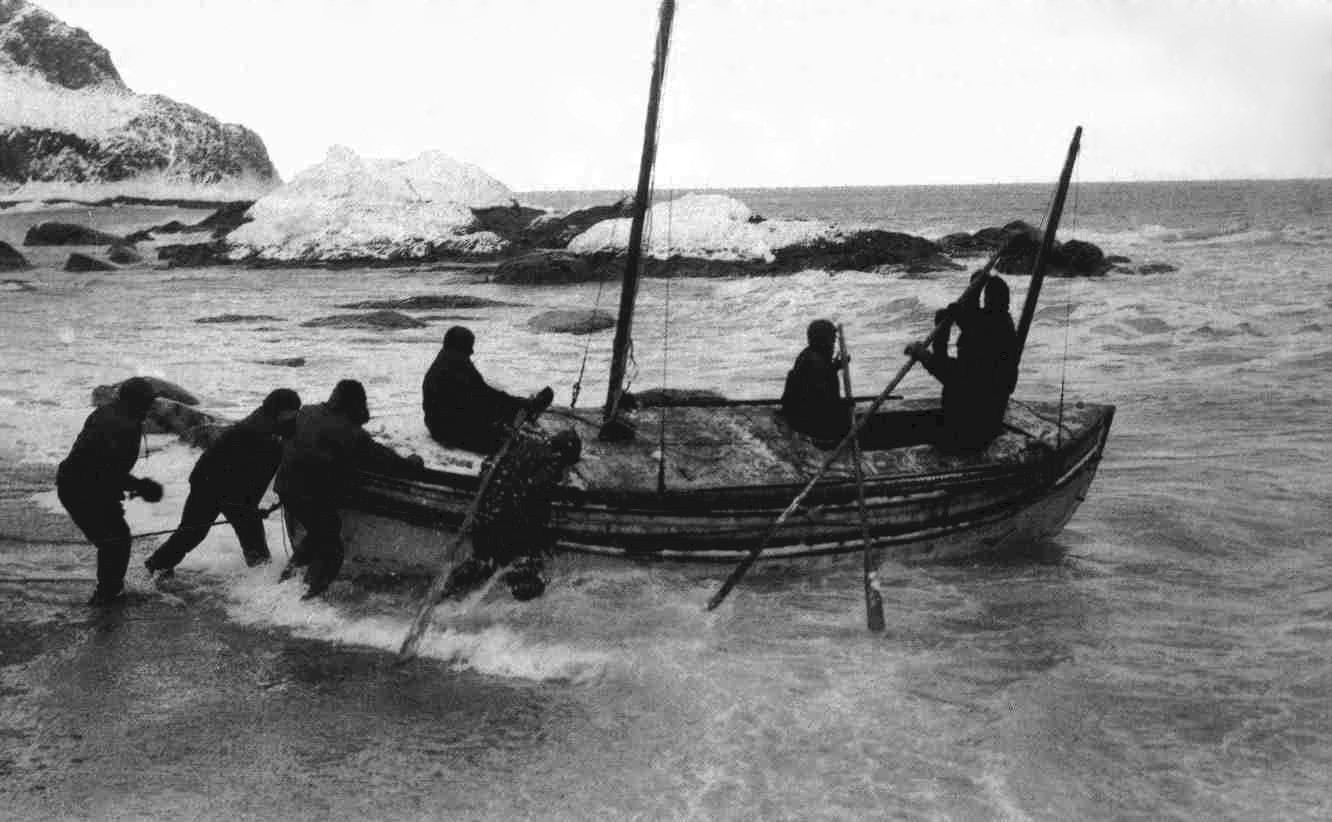
Launching the James Caird from the shore of Elephant Island, 24 April 1916

Shortly after the start of the voyage, the James Caird, which, in addition to Shackleton and Worsley, also carried McNish, sailors John Vincent and Timothy McCarthy, as well as the experienced Tom Crean, encountered the ice but Worsley found a way through and into the open ocean. The crew set up two watches for the journey, which eventually took 16 days in heavy seas to reach South Georgia. For most of the voyage, the weather was so stormy and overcast Worsley was unable to take more than a few sightings with his sextant. He described one sighting as "...cuddling the mast with one arm and swinging fore and aft round the mast, sextant and all..." and he would "...catch the sun when the boat leaped her highest on the crest of a sea...". At times the sea conditions were so rough he was braced by the other crew members when taking his sightings. On occasion, the temperature was bitter and each man would spend one-minute shifts chipping away ice that coated the top surfaces of the James Caird, affecting its buoyancy. The heavy seas meant there was considerable risk that a man could go overboard.

After two weeks, Worsley began to worry about the lack of sightings and advised Shackleton he could not calculate their position to less than 16 km (10 mile) accuracy. As a result, Shackleton opted to aim for the western side of South Georgia which meant that, with the prevailing winds, if they missed their target they would be carried onto the east coast of the island. The next day they began to see drifting seaweed and seabirds circulating overhead, indicating the presence of nearby land. On 8 May, through mists and squalls, the crew sighted South Georgia's Cape Demidov, precisely in line with the course calculated by Worsley. He saw a "...towering black crag, with a lacework of snow around its flanks. One glimpse, and it was hidden again. We looked at each other with cheerful, foolish grins." Sea and wind conditions were such that they were unable to make their way to the Norwegian whaling stations 238 km (148 miles) away on the east coast. Instead they made for King Haakon Bay. Now out of drinking water, they were forced by the high seas to approach the rocky coast with care and heave-to for the night. A gale blew strongly the next day and, despite their best efforts, they stayed offshore for a further night. Conditions were much better on 10 May and, after adverse winds caused failure of his first few attempts, Worsley carefully sailed the James Caird through a rocky reef guarding King Haakon Bay and onto the beach.

=== Trek ===
South Georgia. King Haakon Bay, where the James Caird landed, is the large anvil-shaped indentation at the western end of the southerly side.

After slaking their thirst from a nearby stream, the crew unloaded the James Caird and spent the first night on South Georgia in a cave. The next day, Shackleton announced his intention to walk 35 km (22 miles) across the island to the Norwegian whaling station at Stromness Bay. The crew were too exhausted, and the James Caird too battered, for Shackleton to consider sailing around the island. After resting more than a week, Shackleton, Worsley and Crean, set out on 19 May.

The interior of South Georgia was mountainous and covered with glaciers. Their map of South Georgia showed only the coastline, and on several occasions, they were forced to backtrack when their route was found to be impassable. After a non-stop trek of 36 hours, the trio reached Stromness Bay and were taken to the manager of the whaling station. He was unable to recognise Shackleton, whom he had met during the expedition's stopover on the island nearly two years previously. After a hot bath and a large meal, Worsley set out on a whaler to collect the three men left behind at King Haakon Bay. That night a strong blizzard struck the island. Had it developed while Worsley and the others were on their trek, it would have likely killed them. They were fortunate the weather had been relatively good for their trek across the island. Later, all three trekkers would talk of a "fourth presence" that accompanied them. In his account of the walk, Worsley would write "...I again find myself counting our party—Shackleton, Crean, and I and—who was the other? Of course, there were only three, but it is strange that in mentally reviewing the crossing we should always think of a fourth, and then correct ourselves."

The next day, McNish, McCarthy and Vincent were picked up. They were unable to recognise Worsley, freshly shaven, when he stepped ashore. The James Caird, which had been pulled up the beach and turned over to serve as a shelter, was also retrieved.

=== Rescue ===
Three days after McNish and the others were brought back to Stromness Bay, Shackleton, Crean and Worsley, along with a crew of volunteers from the whaling station, set out on a hired ship for Elephant Island. They got to within 97 km (60 miles) of the island before ice prevented any further passage south. Unable to break a passage through the ice, they steamed to the Falkland Islands to obtain a more suitable vessel. By now news of the fate of the expedition had reached Britain. Despite messages of goodwill and support, the only British vessel that could be found was the RRS Discovery, Robert Falcon Scott's old ship, but this would not be available until October. The war tied up all other available resources.

Waiting for October was not acceptable to Shackleton who, desperately concerned for the men on Elephant Island, continued to search for a ship. The British Foreign Office prevailed on the governments of Uruguay, Chile and Argentina for a suitable vessel. The Uruguayans came forward with a small survey ship, and this was sailed to within sight of Elephant Island before it too had to turn back. An effort with an Argentinean vessel which set sail on 12 July also failed after three weeks of atrocious weather. Chile offered the use of the Yelcho, and on this steel-hulled steamer, Shackleton, Worsley and Crean set out with a crew on 25 August. Fortunately, in contrast to their previous attempt, the weather was mild and on 30 August, they reached Elephant Island where, to their great joy, they found all 22 men who had been left behind alive. Within an hour all were retrieved and, not wanting to risk being trapped by ice, the Yelcho quickly departed for Punta Arenas, where it was greeted with great fanfare. Worsley later wrote: "...I was always sorry for the twenty-two men who lived in that horrible place for four months of misery while we were away on the boat journey, and the four attempts at rescue ending with their joyful relief."

While Worsley had been retrieving McNish and the others from King Haakon Bay, Shackleton was advised of the fate of his Ross Sea party, which had been tasked with laying depots on Shackleton's intended route across Antarctica. Ten men, forming a winter party, had set up a base at Hut Point, while their ship, the SY Aurora, owned by Shackleton, wintered at Cape Evans. In May 1915, the ship broke free from its moorings and became trapped in the ice. Badly damaged, it drifted with the ice for over six months before it broke free and its captain, Joseph Stenhouse, was able to sail it to New Zealand in March 1916. No one had heard from the stranded winter party at Hut Point for nearly two years. After journeying with the rest of the survivors of his own party to Argentina, Shackleton, along with Worsley, left for New Zealand. From here they hoped to find a ship to take them south to retrieve the Ross Sea party.

Shackleton had brought Worsley along intending to use his services in the retrieval of the winter party. However, after their arrival in New Zealand in December 1916, they found themselves without a ship. They had expected to use the Aurora with Shackleton as its captain. In the meantime, the Australian, New Zealand and British governments had put forward funds for the rescue but, influenced by the explorer Douglas Mawson, who disliked Shackleton, the Australian government appointed its own captain. After protracted negotiations, Shackleton sailed on board the Aurora as a supernumerary officer. Worsley was left behind but was placated with a paid passage to Britain. The seven surviving members of the winter party were duly rescued. Worsley was later awarded the Polar Medal for his service on the expedition.

== First World War ==
Shortly after Shackleton returned to New Zealand from the Ross Sea, having picked up the survivors of the winter party, Worsley travelled to England aboard the RMS Makura. As an RNR officer, he wanted to join in the fight against Imperial Germany. After arriving in Liverpool, he made his way to London and was quickly assigned to HMS Pembroke, the shore station at Chatham. Here, for three months, he learned about fighting U-boats, which were causing considerable damage to supply convoys crossing the Atlantic. Several tactics were deployed against the U-boats. One of these involved the use of Q-ships, small merchant vessels fitted out with hidden armament that could be deployed against any U-boats which surfaced and approached the seemingly unarmed ship. Another tactic was the use of P-boats, which were patrol boats that carried out convoy escort duties and anti-submarine work. The P-boats had a distinctive profile, and their effectiveness wore off as U-boat commanders began to recognise and avoid them. Later-built P-boats were designed with a more conventional profile approximating that of a merchant ship, and thus were similar to Q-ships.

In July 1917, Worsley was appointed commander of the PC.61, one of the later P-boats, with Joseph Stenhouse as his first officer. The PC.61, commissioned on 31 July 1917, was equipped with a semi-automatic 4-inch (100 mm) gun that was hidden by a tarpaulin suspended from crane derricks when not in use. She also had a ram at her bow. Shortly after its commissioning, Worsley took his new command to sea on patrol. Most patrols were uneventful; sometimes U-boats were sighted and pursued, but they got away. Occasionally torpedoes were fired at his ship. Worsley felt the PC.61 was too easily identified as a Royal Navy vessel against which U-boats were too cautious to make a surface attack. The submarine would attack with torpedoes while submerged.

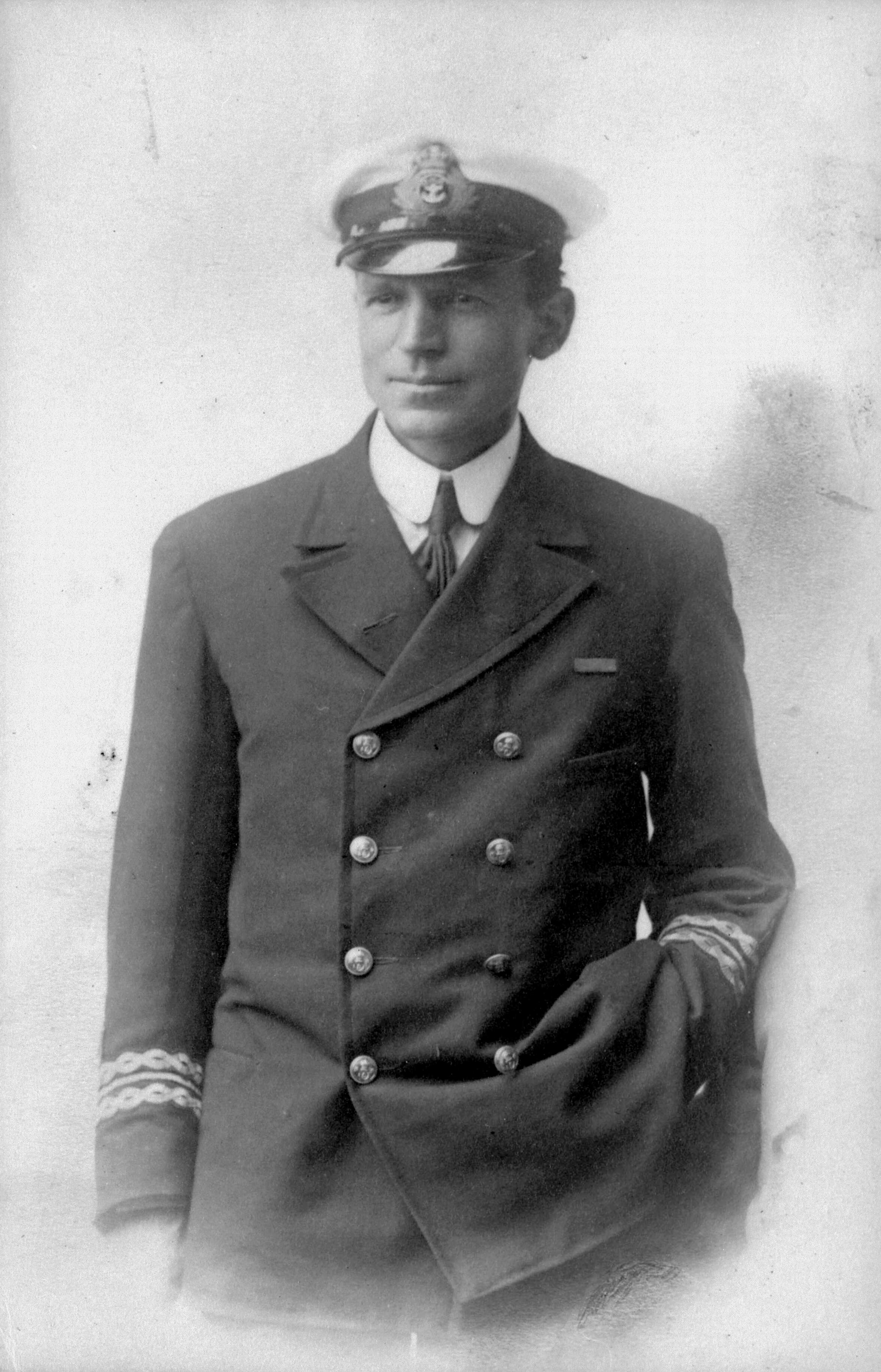
Worsley, in the uniform of a lieutenant commander of the Royal Naval Reserve, 1917

On 26 September 1917, Worsley and the PC.61 were on patrol south of Ireland when a U-boat, UC-33, torpedoed a nearby tanker. Worsley gradually slowed his ship's propellers, hoping to deceive the U-boat's crew into thinking his P-boat was leaving the area and luring it to the surface. The deception was successful and the UC-33 surfaced, intending to sink the tanker with its deck gun. Worsley immediately ordered full speed ahead and, realising that he would lose time in manoeuvring his ship into a position in which she could use her guns, set a course to ram the U-boat. At high speeds the ship's ram lifted out of the water, and Worsley had to reduce speed at the right moment for it to be at the best height to hit the submarine. He timed it perfectly and hit UC-33 midships as it was submerging. The submarine rapidly sunk with all hands except the captain, who gave Worsley a silver whistle after being rescued. The damaged tanker was towed to Milford Haven in Wales, which took 12 hours in an area where other U-boats were known to be lurking.

For his role in the sinking of the UC-33, Worsley was awarded the Distinguished Service Order (DSO) and Shackleton sent him a telegram congratulating him on his success. Worsley conducted patrols with the PC.61 for several more months. In September 1918, he was given command of HMS Pangloss, a Q-ship operating in the Mediterranean and which had been commanded by Commander Gordon Campbell. With the war nearly over, Worsley did not anticipate much excitement in his new posting.

=== Northern Russia ===
Passing through London en route to Gibraltar, where the Pangloss was based, Worsley met Shackleton, recently assigned by the War Office to the International Contingent destined for Northern Russia to aid the White movement in its fight against the Bolsheviks. Shackleton's expertise in the polar regions had been recognised by the War Office, and with the temporary rank of major, he was preparing the contingent for a winter deployment to Murmansk. Shackleton had already recruited several veterans of the Endurance to serve with him and arranged for Worsley, keen for action, to be transferred to join the contingent. Worsley, by now a lieutenant commander, left for Murmansk the following month.

After he arrived in Russia, Worsley was selected to go to Arkhangelsk where he organised equipment and supplies for the British forces stationed there. He provided extensive advice, derived from his polar experience, to soldiers on how to best make use of their resources and trained them in the use of skis. He participated in several patrols and, due to a shortage of officers, occasionally took command of platoons of British infantry. In April 1919, he was posted back to Murmansk, where he took command of the gunboat HMS Cricket. He took her up the Dvinia River and targeted Bolshevik gunboats and villages along the river. He also provided support to British and White Russian units moving along the banks of the river in operations to seize ground lost to the Bolsheviks in the winter months.

Worsley commanded Cricket for two months before becoming the captain of HMS M24, a monitor and tender to HMS Fox. His time in command was short as he managed to attach himself to the Hampshire Regiment. In August, he participated in a raid behind Bolshevik lines. The raiding party of 25 men obtained useful intelligence by tapping telegraph lines and ambushing a Bolshevik convoy but their presence soon became known and they were pursued by a force of over 200 Bolsheviks. When the captain commanding the party became lost in a forest, he deferred navigation to Worsley, who successfully led all 25 men back to safety. For his efforts, he was awarded a bar to his DSO. The citation for his award read:

In recognition of the gallantry displayed by him at Pocha in North Russia between the 2nd and 5th August 1919. This officer formed one of a large patrol which in circumstances of great danger and difficulty penetrated many miles behind the enemy lines, and by his unfailingly cheery leadership he kept up the spirits of all under trying conditions. By his assistance in bridging an unfordable river behind the enemy lines, he greatly helped the success of the enterprise.

— The London Gazette, No. 31604, 14 October 1919.

When the Allied forces left Murmansk and Archangel in late 1919, Worsley returned to London. He was rewarded for his service in Russia by being appointed to the Order of St. Stanislaus. He was discharged from service on 2 January 1920 and placed on the RNR retired list. Later in the year, in a ceremony at Buckingham Palace, he was appointed Officer of the Order of the British Empire for his services to Great Britain.

== Quest ==
Worsley remained in near constant contact with Shackleton, who was attempting to put together an expedition to the Arctic, and was hopeful of securing a suitable position in the endeavour. However, the expedition was still some way off and in the meantime, Worsley set up a shipping company with his friend Stenhouse. The company, Stenhouse Worsley & Co, purchased a schooner, Annie, with the intention of trading with the Baltic states. This plan collapsed when the Baltic freight market fell on hard times and eventually, the company started shipping freight along the British coast. In late 1920, Worsley and Stenhouse went on a trading voyage to Iceland. The Annie carried cargo on the outward trip but was nearly wrecked when sailing around the coast of Iceland to pick up cargo from a remote port for the return trip to England. Poor weather and sea conditions kept the Annie in Iceland until February 1921, when Worsley was able to carry freight back to Britain. By then Shackleton was ready to proceed with his expedition and wanted Worsley as the captain of his ship, the Quest, an offer which he quickly accepted.

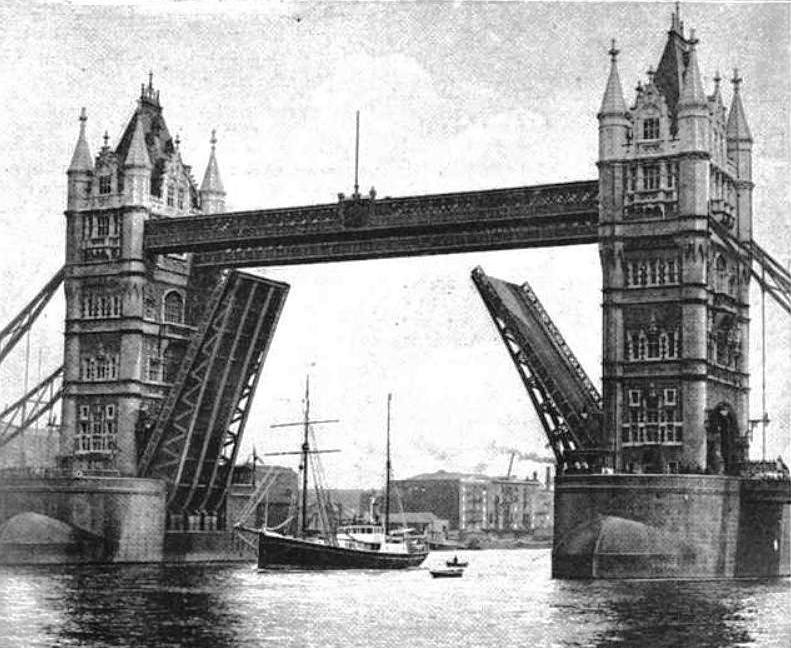
Quest passing through Tower Bridge, London

After the Canadian government withdrew promised financial support for the expedition, the delay in finding replacement funding ate into the Arctic sailing season. Shackleton, not wanting to delay departure any longer than he had to, decided to go south instead and attempt a circumnavigation of the Antarctic continent. The expedition, known as the Shackleton–Rowett Expedition (John Rowett, an old friend of Shackleton's, was the main sponsor), would also attempt to discover sub-Antarctic islands and spend the southern winter in the Pacific islands. The expedition included several Endurance veterans in addition to Worsley; Frank Wild was again second in command, and Leonard Hussey was the meteorologist. Worsley was the master of the Quest, but would also be the expedition's hydrographer.

The Quest, a 34 m (111-foot) two-masted sealing ship from Norway, set sail on 18 September 1921. The ship did not sail well and leaked. There were also problems with the engine. A week was spent in Portugal undergoing repairs and, after crossing the Atlantic, the Quest spent a month in the docks of Rio de Janeiro. While in Brazil, Shackleton, whose health had been poor for some time, suffered a heart attack. After he declined treatment for his condition, the expedition left for South Georgia on 18 December. The island was sighted on 4 January 1922 and both Worsley and Shackleton were "like a pair of excitable kids", pointing out landmarks from their walk across South Georgia back in 1916. The following day, Shackleton suffered a fatal heart attack. Worsley described the loss of his friend as "...a terribly sad blow. I have lost a dear pal, one of the whitest men, in spite of his faults, that ever lived."

Despite this setback, the expedition continued with Wild in command while Hussey returned to England with Shackleton's body. On 22 January, Worsley suffered a serious accident. Under sail, the Quest had been rolling heavily and ropes securing a lifeboat snapped. The lifeboat, full of stores, swung against the wheelhouse and crushed Worsley against the bridge. He broke several ribs and had to rest for several days. By the end of March, after being briefly trapped in ice in the Weddell Sea, the ship reached Elephant Island. The expedition then returned to South Georgia, where Hussey was waiting. Shackleton's widow had directed that he be buried on South Georgia and Hussey had returned to the island in late February to fulfil her request.

Worsley and the rest of the expedition spent several weeks on South Georgia, and he assisted in the building of a memorial cairn to Shackleton in King Edward Cove. In his autobiography, Worsley wrote "Shackleton's body lies buried far from the land of his birth: let us ensure that his spirit continues to be our common heritage". The expedition then sailed for Tristan da Cunha, where Worsley carried out some mapping work. Other stops were made at Cape Town, Ascension Island and Saint Helena before the expedition arrived back in England in September 1922.

== Arctic ==
The Atlantic shipping trade occupied Worsley after his return to England. He was master of the George Cochran for a time in 1923, shipping rum to Montreal. The following year he was in command of the Kathleen Annie when it was wrecked in the Orkney Islands. He ensured the evacuation of his crew before leaving the stricken ship for the safety of the shore.

During his time in Canada, Worsley had made the acquaintance of a young Canadian, Grettir Algarsson, who was of Icelandic descent and was preparing a ship for a voyage to the Arctic. Algarsson's voyage proved short-lived, as his ship collided with floating wreckage while in the North Sea. Undeterred, he set about preparing an expedition for the following year and invited Worsley, who had provided advice for his previous voyage, to join him. The plan was to sail to Spitzbergen, in the Arctic Circle, and Algarsson was to fly from there to the North Pole where he would crash the plane, and, with his pilot, sledge back. Worsley was to captain the ship that Algarsson had purchased for the expedition, a 30m (99 foot) diesel-engined brigantine called the Island. A lack of funds resulted in the cancellation of the planned flight as a suitable plane could not be found. However, the 15-man expedition, known as the Algarsson North Polar Expedition, went ahead with mapping and scientific objectives, among them a search for Gillis Land, northeast of Spitzbergen, which was not known to have been sighted since 1707, and sounding the continental shelf between Spitzbergen and Franz Josef Land. With the plane flight no longer viable, and the focus of the expedition now primarily on maritime matters, Algarsson offered Worsley co-leadership of the expedition, which he accepted. The Island sailed on 21 June 1925 from Liverpool.

When sailing the western side of Spitzbergen, a blade of the propeller of the Island was damaged in a collision with an ice floe. When the engine was run, severe vibration was felt and this forced Worsley to continue northwards under sail, searching for Gillis Land until the ship reached the pack ice. While doing so, soundings were taken which confirmed the presence of a submarine plain between Spitzbergen and the island group of Franz Josef Land. Turning south and sailing along the northern coast of Spitzbergen, a previously uncharted harbour was found, which Algarsson named after Worsley. The ship then sailed north, still seeking Gillis Land, but became trapped in the ice. Worsley took the opportunity to create an ice dock to facilitate repairs to the rudder, which had become damaged. After two weeks beset in the ice, he used the engine to break free but the last blade of the propeller was lost in the process.

The Island was now effectively without an engine, a prospect that did not daunt Worsley as he sailed for Franz Josef Land. He described it as "sail's last unaided battle with the polar pack [pack ice]". In August he landed on Cape Barents, one of the southern islands of Franz Josef Land, and planted a Union Jack. Together with the ship's engineer who was from Dunedin, he claimed to be the first New Zealander to set foot on Franz Josef Land. The expedition, which had been renamed the British Arctic Expedition with the consensus of the participants, made several attempts to find a way northwards through the pack ice, Worsley harbouring hopes of being the first sailing ship to sail through the island group to Gillis Land and then back to Spitzbergen, but was unsuccessful. In one attempt, the Island nearly collided with a large iceberg. Worsley ordered a rowboat to take to the water and the ship was towed out of harm's way.

Finally, on 14 September, what was thought to be Gillis Land was spotted several miles away. The Island was unable to sail close enough to confirm the sighting, but Worsley noted that it was to the west of its charted position. If it was Gillis Land, it was the first sighting of the island for 200 years (Gillis Land no longer appears on modern charts). The ship then sailed to North-East Land, circumnavigating it and while doing so reaching the expedition's farthest north, 81°15′N. Worsley ensured the New Zealand flag was flown at the spot. The expedition then set sail for Spitzbergen, reaching the island's Green Harbour in mid-October. The ship's engine could not be repaired before Green Harbour was closed for winter and Worsley accepted a tow to Tromsø, the conclusion of which marked the end of the expedition. He later wrote a book of the voyage, Under Sail in the Frozen North, which was published in 1927.

== London life ==
After the completion of his Arctic voyage, Worsley returned to life in London, where he had a reasonably high-profile due to his exploits with Shackleton and his wartime service. In 1926, he married Jean Cumming, whom he had met in 1920 at New Zealand House in London while collecting his mail. It was his second marriage; in 1907 he had married Theodora Blackden, but she had left him by the time of his return from Russia (the couple had no children). It took several years for Worsley to obtain a divorce to allow his marriage to Jean, 20 years his junior, to take place. For income in between trading voyages, Worsley wrote books and articles. Two of these, Shackleton's Boat Journey and Crossing South Georgia were published as serials in the periodical Blue Peter in 1924, and were well received. These books were published together as a single volume in 1931. His book was considered superior to Shackleton's own account, published as South in 1919. In 1938, a fourth book, First Voyage in a Square-rigged Ship was published. When his financial circumstances required it, which was often, Worsley would write an article for money. His topics would range from the dogs used on the expedition to the pipe smoking habits of his Elephant Island cohabitants.

Worsley also conducted lecturing tours for income, his profile enhanced by his publication record. As sailing commissions at this late stage of his life were in short supply, his lectures became more important as a source of income. He mainly lectured on his voyages with Shackleton, whose wife lent Worsley several of her late husband's slides to enhance his talks. In later years, he added talks on his own voyages to his repertoire. His lectures were well received with glowing reviews in local newspapers. His profile was boosted following his appearance in the film South, released in 1933, for which he provided an accent-free narration. The film was based on Frank Hurley's cine film of the Endurance expedition, intercut with photographic slides. He made an onscreen appearance in the film, showing the audience several artefacts from the expedition. Like his books, the film was very well received.

In the 1930s, Worsley was part of a yacht and ship delivery company, Imray Laurie Norie & Wilson Limited. His personal experience was a key selling point in the company's commercial literature. In 1937, the company completed over 50 delivery voyages. The longest delivery was that of a steamer destined for Hong Kong, which took three months. On many of these voyages he was accompanied by Jean, who also enjoyed sailing.

== Treasure hunting ==
Even into his 60s, Worsley still sought adventure. In 1934, he was asked to join the Treasury Recovery Limited Expedition which was organised to locate treasure allegedly hidden at Cocos Island by pirates. In earlier times, the island had been used as a base by the pirates to attack Spanish ships transporting gold from South America back to Spain. At the time of mounting the expedition, it was believed that between £5 million and £25 million in gold and silver was buried on the island. Worsley sailed, with Jean for company, for Cocos Island in September 1934 aboard the Queen of Scots. On arrival at the island in October, he assisted in unloading stores to set up a village at Wafer Bay, the safest landing point on Cocos. The island, off the coast of Costa Rica, was heavily forested and hard labour was necessary to clear likely spots for searching. As the Queen of Scots was found to be too large for the expedition's needs, Worsley left with the ship to return to England via the Panama Canal. He was to source a replacement vessel and bring back supplies.

En route, Worsley found that the government of Costa Rica, unhappy at not being informed of the expedition's plans, intended to forcibly remove the treasure hunters from Cocos Island. Despite Worsley's dispatch of a personal cable to the Costa Rican president, and ensuing publicity in England, some of the expedition's men were forcibly taken to Panama. The others remained on Cocos under guard. By this time, the leaders of the expedition had returned to England, leaving Worsley as controller of the remaining men. He funded supplies for the remaining men from his own pocket but eventually those remaining on Cocos were shipped to Panama and discharged.

The expedition regathered, and after obtaining a concession from the Costa Rican government, returned to the island the following year. He sailed the expedition's new yacht, Veracity, from England to Cocos Island in a troubled voyage, again accompanied by Jean. The expedition was underfunded and supplies were lacking. Mechanical failure while en route also hampered the voyage. By the time of his arrival on Cocos, he had been appointed the controller of the expedition. Despite extensive searching with a crude metal detector, no trace of the treasure had been found by September. Worsley, with a lecture season beginning in London in October, left the island in early September. This was his last involvement with the expedition which, after nine more months, failed to locate the treasure hunt. The expedition ended when funding ran out. Despite the lack of success, Worsley still believed treasure was to be found on the island and hoped to return. He never did, although his treasure hunting exploits provided plenty of material for his lecture tours.

== Later life ==
When the Second World War broke out in September 1939, Worsley was keen to contribute to the war effort. His age of 67 prevented his recall to the Royal Navy Reserve. He eventually joined the International Red Cross and travelled to France where he lectured troops of the British Expeditionary Force (BEF) during the Phoney War. He also sought support from the War Office to provide equipment to Swedish volunteers travelling to Finland to assist its countrymen in fighting the Russians during the brief Winter War. When another BEF was sent to Norway in April 1940 to help secure railway links to Sweden, the Red Cross, intending to have a unit in the country as well, appointed Worsley as its Advance Agent – Norway. He was to prepare the way for the unit but after the Germans captured Narvik, it became too dangerous for the Red Cross to be involved. After a brief visit to Norway, Worsley returned to Britain.

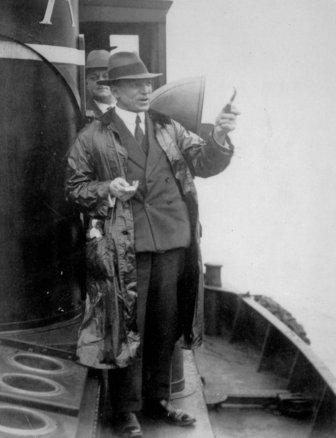
Worsley in 1940–1941, possibly aboard the Dalriada

Worsley became the commander of a Red Cross training depot in Balham, London, but it later closed down due to a lack of recruits. He repeatedly wrote to the War Office offering his services and proposing various schemes involving Norway, including one to land guns at Spitzbergen, an area he knew well from his Arctic expedition in 1925.

Eventually, Worsley found a command in the Merchant Navy, and, giving his age as 64 (when he was actually 69), was appointed master of the Dalriada in August 1941. He worked to keep the harbour entrance at Sheerness clear of wrecked shipping and also carried out salvage work. His command lasted only for a few months; when the company that owned his vessel found out his true age, he was replaced. Unhappy at being put into the Merchant Navy Reserve Pool, he continued to advocate for a useful posting.

In April 1942, Worsley was appointed to the staff at a training establishment for the Royal Naval Volunteer Reserve, HMS King Alfred in Sussex, giving lectures on charts and pilotage. After two months he was transferred to the Royal Naval College, Greenwich. While in Sussex, his health began to deteriorate and he cut down on his pipe smoking. After a few months at Greenwich, he took ill and was hospitalised. Diagnosed with lung cancer, naval doctors found that they could do little for Worsley, and he was discharged. He opted to spend the last days of his life with his wife and the Bamford family. Eric Bamford was a good friend of his, who lived in Claygate, Surrey. He died in the Bamford house on 1 February 1943. He was cremated at Woking Crematorium after a well-attended service held on 3 February at the chapel of the Royal Naval College. His casket was adorned with the New Zealand ensign and Worsley's personal standard that he had flown aboard the Quest in the 1921–22 expedition. His ashes were scattered at the mouth of the Thames River, near the Nore lightship.

After Worsley's death, Jean Worsley donated his unpublished diaries to the Scott Polar Research Institute. She returned to Aberdeen, where she had spent much of the previous months, to live with her mother. Jean later moved to Claygate following the death of her mother, and lived with the Bamfords. Her final years were spent in relative financial comfort; several years before his death, Worsley had invested in shares in Venezuela Oil, which later became Shell Oil and provided good returns for Jean. She died at the Bamford home in 1978, at the age of 78, and in the same room that her husband had occupied at the time of his death. The couple were childless.

== Legacy ==
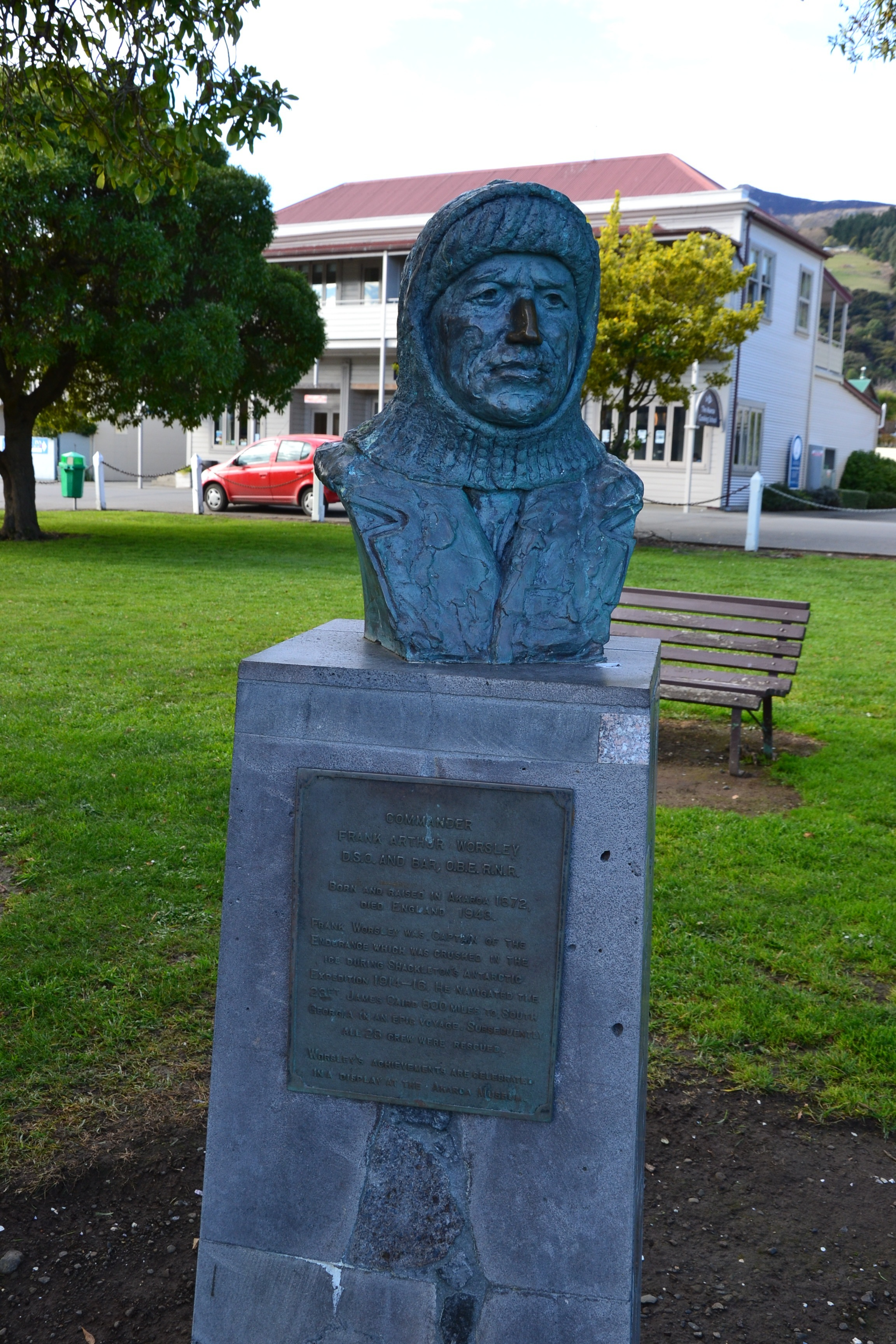
The bust of Frank Worsley in Akaroa

A bust of Frank Worsley stands in his home town of Akaroa, New Zealand. The sculpture was created by artist Stephen Gleeson of Christchurch and unveiled in 2004. The town's museum also displays the ensign from Worsley's former command, the PC.61.

In October 2026 the Frank Worsley Antarctic Research Library opened in Christchurch, New Zealand.

Several geographical features are named for Worsley, including Mount Worsley on South Georgia, Cape Worsley in the British Antarctic Territory, the Worsley Icefalls in the Ross Dependency and Worsley Harbour at Spitzbergen. Worsleys Road in the Christchurch suburb of Cracroft is named for his grandfather; it was built by him as an access road for his farm.

In 2015, 190 hectares (470 acres) of land at Akaroa, on which his childhood home stood, were purchased by the New Zealand Native Forest Restoration Trust. The land borders the Hinewai Reserve, with its staff managing the long process of native forest re-establishing itself and building walking tracks. The Rod Donald Banks Peninsula Trust, Akaroa Museum, and Hinewai staff have erected information panels at the house site. As a teenager, Worsley helped with clearing bush on Banks Peninsula that is now being restored, and he wrote later in life:

It was a mad waste. The colonists in their greed for more grass seed and sheep pasture burned millions of pounds worth of timber. They recklessly destroyed the wonderful beauty of the bush, baring the soil until it was carried away by landslides, and lowered the rainfall, and laid waste the homes of countless sweet songsters.
