= Paget process =

Colour photography process

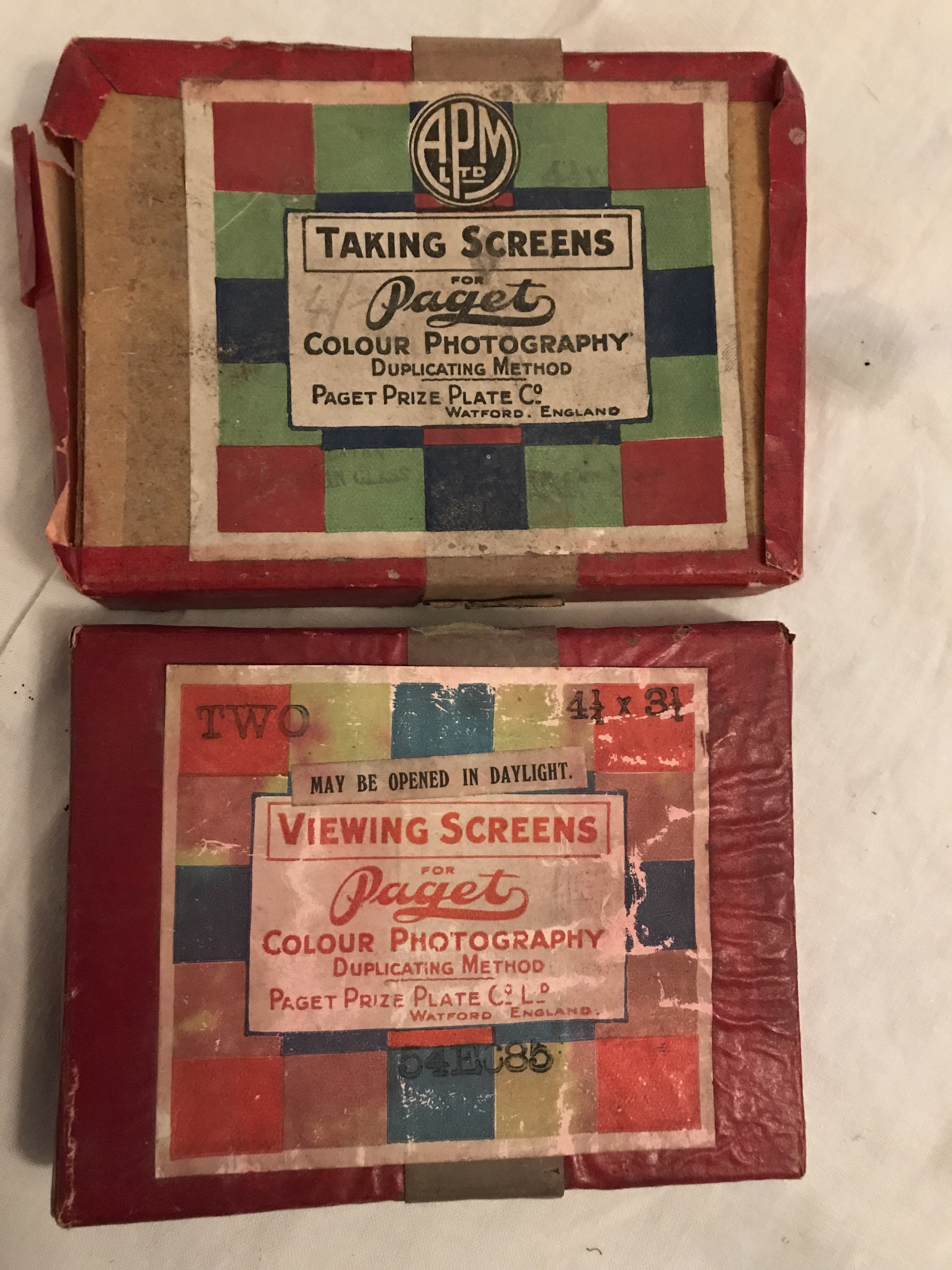
Paget Plate Boxes

The Paget process was an early colour photography process patented in Britain in 1912 by G.S. Whitfield and first marketed in 1913 by the Paget Prize Plate Company of Watford, England. A paper-based Paget process was also briefly sold. Both were discontinued in the early 1920s. Among its best-known users was the Australian photographer Frank Hurley, who took Paget plates on the Imperial Trans-Antarctic Expedition of 1914–1917.

== Photography ==
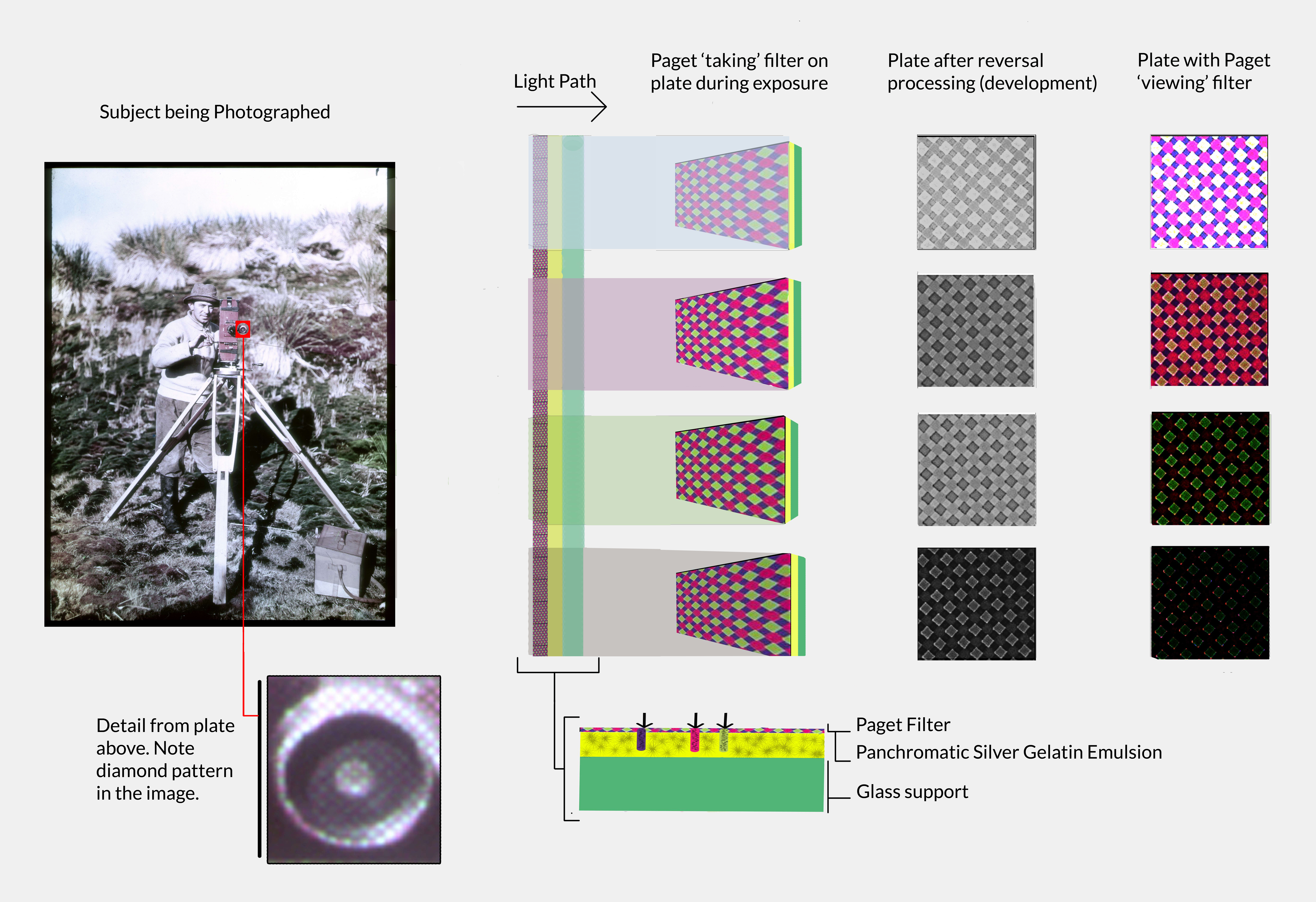
Illustration of Paget Colour process

The system used two glass plates, one of which was the colour screen plate while the other was a standard black-and-white negative plate. The colour screen plate carried a regular mosaic of tiny red, green and blue filter elements forming a réseau, or matrix: lines of red and blue squares alternated with lines of green and blue squares, running at 45 degrees to the edge of the plate. The red and green squares measured about 0.084 mm across and the blue ones about 0.063 mm. Because the negatives of the time required long exposure times, the colours in the screen plate were diluted to let more light through to the negative, resulting in a quicker exposure. A viewing screen with more intense colour filters was used in combination with the developed positive to project a composite colour image.

The colour screen plate was usually sold as a separate item to the panchromatic negatives. A single colour screen plate could be placed into the camera and used to expose many negatives in succession. The resultant negatives looked like standard black-and-white negatives, with a noticeable crosshatch patterning in areas of strong colour.

== Viewing ==
Transparency positives could be made from the system's panchromatic negatives by contact printing; these positives were then bound in register with a colour viewing screen of the same type as used for exposure, to reproduce the image in colour. Multiple copies could be printed from each negative, the resultant positives each being registered with their own colour viewing screens. If, on the other hand, a black-and-white print was required, the negative was used and the colour viewing screen ignored.

Many surviving Paget viewing screens have faded or suffered colour shifts over the years; uneven fading of the dyes often leaves the images with a pink or purplish cast that no longer reflects their original colour fidelity.

== Advantages and disadvantages ==
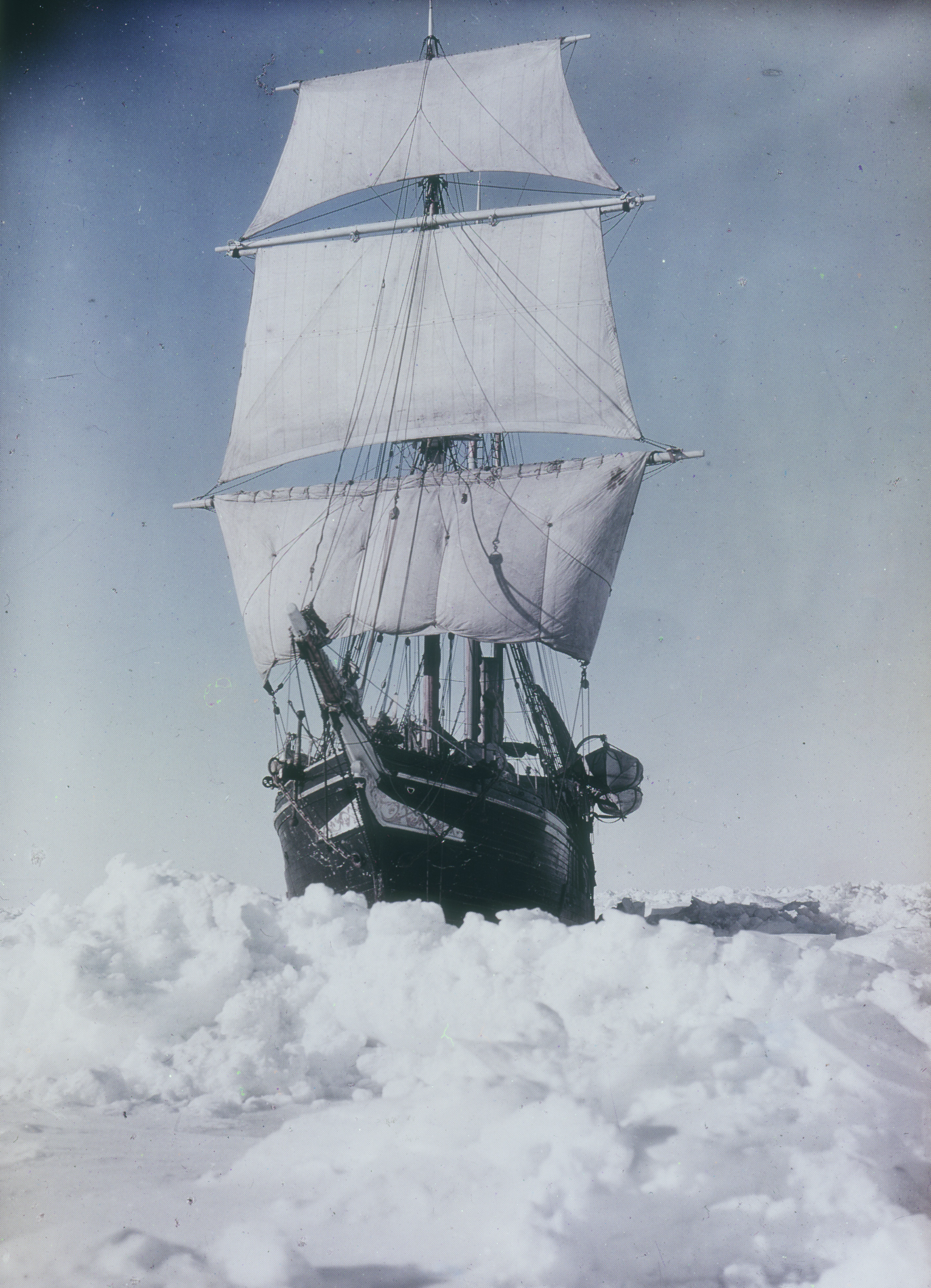
Endurance Antarctic Ocean, Paget Plate by Frank Hurley, c. 1915.

One advantage of the Paget system was its speed: Paget plates needed exposures about four times shorter than contemporary Autochrome plates. Exposures of around 1/25 second were possible. It was also a negative/positive process with a separate colour screen, which meant that multiple copies and prints were straightforward to produce.

The chief disadvantage of the system was that its colours were considered unfaithful and pale compared with those of the Autochrome, and its rendering of yellows was particularly poor.
