= William Stephenson (sailor) =

English marine engine stoker (1889–1953)

William Henry Stephenson
- Born: 19 April 1877; York, Yorkshire, England
- Died: 20 April 1927 (aged 50)
- Citizenship: British
- Occupation: Marine engine stoker

William Henry Stephenson (19 April 1877 – 20 April 1927) was an English marine engine stoker. He is best known for having been a stoker on the exploration vessel Endurance, on the Imperial Trans-Antarctic Expedition of 1914-1916, led by Sir Ernest Shackleton.

== Career ==
Before his Antarctic service, it is believed that Stephenson served as a seaman on the fishing trawlers that put out from Hull on the Yorkshire coast to the fishing banks of the North Sea, although he is recorded in the 1911 Census as being a Moulder at the National Radiator Company, at their factory in Hull. Stephenson served as a stoker aboard the Endurance, and after the vessel sank in late 1915, he joined the other members of the ship's crew as a castaway and was rescued in August 1916. Stephenson is one of the lesser-known explorers in Antarctic history. In the words of the Endurance crew's biographer, John F. Mann, "very little is recorded or known about his life, and of the 28 members of the Endurance, he is perhaps the most mysterious."

Despite his apparent sea experience, he occupied a humble space on the Endurance, and few of the diaries and journals kept by his shipmates mention him or flesh out his character. One tiny fragment of information indicates that although William Stephenson's nickname in civilian life was "Bill", he was known on the Endurance as "Steve".

Press coverage of Stephenson's dramatic rescue from the Antarctic in August 1916 appears to have been confined to the printing of his name on a manifest listing the passengers on a steamboat marking the final stage of their return to England in late 1916.

When the Endurance crew returned to England, the First World War was at its height, and in common with a number of his crew-mates, Stephenson signed up for military service, joining the Royal Navy Reserve on 8 February 1917. He was demobilised in 1922. He received the British War Medal and the Victory Medal for his service.

== Personal life ==
Stephenson was born on 19 April 1877 in York, and by the time that he joined the crew of the Endurance he was living with his wife Edith Annie Stephenson (née Binks) and their two daughters, Doris and Nellie, in Kingston Upon Hull. In fact Edith was pregnant with their third daughter when Stephenson embarked on the Endurance expedition, and Gladys was born in February 1915.

He died in Hull Royal Infirmary on 20 April 1927, as a result of complications arising from gallbladder and gastric ulcer surgery. He is recorded on his death certificate as a Marine Engineer.

== Legacy ==
With his fellow fireman-stoker Ernest Holness, William Stephenson was one of four members of the Endurance crew to be denied the Polar Medal. The reasons, if any, for expedition leader Shackleton's failure to recommend Stephenson for this honour are unknown.
