= McNish Island =

McNish Island (54°9′S 37°28′W) is the larger of two islands lying at the east side of Cheapman Bay on the south side of South Georgia. It was surveyed by the South Georgia Survey in the period 1951–57, and named by the United Kingdom Antarctic Place-Names Committee (UK-APC) for Harry McNish (1858–1930), carpenter on Sir Ernest Shackleton's Imperial Trans-Antarctic Expedition of 1914–1917. The name was changed from McNeish Island to McNish Island in 1998 after submittal of Henry McNish's birth certificate to the United Kingdom Antarctic Place-Names Committee proved the correct spelling of his surname.

== See also ==
- List of Antarctic and sub-Antarctic islands
