= Harry McNish =

Scottish ships' carpenter (1858–1930)

Harry "Chippy" McNish
- Photo of McNish cropped from the 1914–1917 Imperial Trans-Antarctic Expedition crew photo
- Born: 11 September 1874; Port Glasgow, Inverclyde, Scotland
- Died: 24 September 1930 (aged 56); Wellington, New Zealand
- Occupations: Carpenter, Shipwright
- Spouses: Jessie Smith; Ellen Timothy; Lizzie Littlejohn
- Partner: Agnes Martindale

Henry McNish (11 September 1874 – 24 September 1930), often referred to as Harry McNish or by the nickname Chippy, was the carpenter on Sir Ernest Shackleton's Imperial Trans-Antarctic Expedition of 1914–1917. He was responsible for much of the work that ensured the crew's survival after their ship, the Endurance, was destroyed when it became trapped in pack ice in the Weddell Sea. He modified the small boat, James Caird, that allowed Shackleton and five men (including McNish) to make a voyage of 800 miles across the perilous Southern Ocean to fetch help for the rest of the crew.

After the expedition he returned to work in the Merchant Navy and eventually emigrated to New Zealand, where he worked on the docks in Wellington until poor health forced his retirement. He died destitute in the Ohiro Benevolent Home in Wellington.

== Early life ==
Harry "Chippy" McNish was born in 1874 in the former Lyons Lane near the present site of the library in Port Glasgow, Inverclyde, Scotland.^{[a]} He was part of a large family, being the third of eleven children born to John and Mary Jane (née Wade) McNish. His father was a journeyman shoemaker. McNish held strong socialist views, was a member of the United Free Church of Scotland and detested bad language. He married three times: in 1895 to Jessie Smith, who died in February 1898; in 1898 to Ellen Timothy, who died in December 1904; and finally to Lizzie Littlejohn in 1907.

There is some confusion as to the correct spelling of his name. He is variously referred to as McNish, McNeish, and in Alexander Macklin's diary of the expedition, MacNish. The McNeish spelling is common, notably in Shackleton's and Frank Worsley's accounts of the expedition and on McNish's headstone, but McNish is also widely used, and appears to be the correct version. On a signed copy of the expedition photo his signature appears as "H. MacNish", but his spelling is in general idiosyncratic, as revealed in the diary he kept throughout the expedition. There also is a question regarding McNish's nickname. "Chippy" was a traditional nickname for a shipwright; both this and the shorter "Chips" (as in wood chips from carpentry) seem to have been used.

== Imperial Trans-Antarctic Expedition ==
=== Endurance ===
The aim of the Imperial Trans-Antarctic Expedition was to be the first to cross the Antarctic continent from one side to the other. McNish was apparently attracted by Shackleton's advertisement for the expedition (although there are doubts as to whether the advertisement ever appeared):

MEN WANTED: FOR HAZARDOUS JOURNEY. SMALL WAGES, BITTER COLD, LONG MONTHS OF COMPLETE DARKNESS, CONSTANT DANGER, SAFE RETURN DOUBTFUL. HONOUR AND RECOGNITION IN CASE OF SUCCESS. SIR ERNEST SHACKLETON

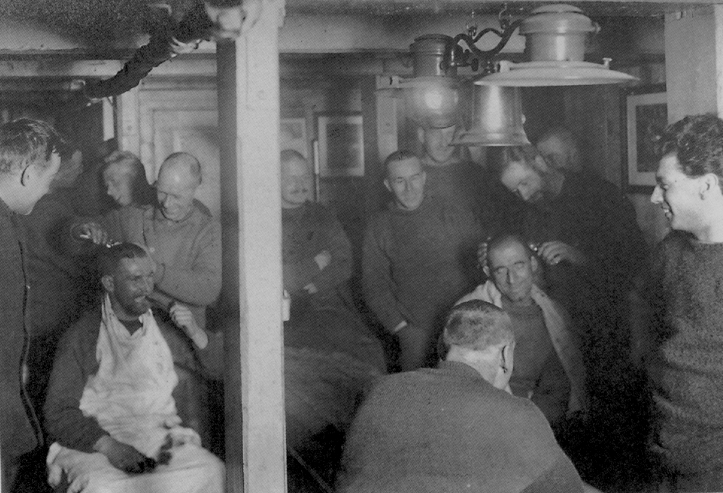
The crew have their hair cut aboard Endurance. McNish is on the left shaving Greenstreet's head.

Endurance trapped in pack ice. McNish's work prevented it flooding, but he could do nothing to stop it being crushed.

McNish suffered from piles and rheumatism in his legs. He was regarded as somewhat odd and unrefined, but also highly respected as a carpenter – Frank Worsley, the captain of the Endurance, refers to him as a "splendid shipwright".^{[b]} The pipe-smoking Scot was, however, the only man of the crew that Shackleton was "not dead certain of". His Scots accent was described as rasping like "frayed cable wire".

During the initial stage of the voyage to Antarctica from Buenos Aires, he was kept busy with a number of routine tasks. He worked on the pram dinghy Nancy Endurance; made a small chest of drawers for Shackleton; specimen shelves for the biologist, Robert Clark; and instrument cases for Leonard Hussey, the meteorologist; and put up wind screens to protect the helmsman. He constructed a false deck, extending from the poop-deck to the chart-room to cover the extra coal that the ship had taken on board. He also acted as the ship's barber. As the ship pushed into the pack ice in the Weddell Sea it became increasingly difficult to navigate. McNish constructed a six-foot wooden semaphore on the bridge to enable the navigating officer to give the helmsman directions, and built a small stage over the stern to allow the propeller to be watched in order to keep it clear of the heavy ice.

When the ship became trapped in pack ice his duties expanded to constructing makeshift housing, and, once it became clear that the ship was doomed, to altering the sledges for the journey over the ice to open water. He built the quarters where the crew took their meals (nicknamed The Ritz) and cubicles where the men could sleep. These were all christened as well; McNish shared The Sailors' Rest with Alfred Cheetham, the Third Officer. Assisted by the crew, he constructed kennels for the dogs on the upper deck. Once Endurance became trapped, and the crew were spending the days on the ice, McNish erected goalposts and football became a daily fixture for the men. To pass the time in the evening, McNish joined Frank Wild, Tom Crean, James McIlroy, Worsley and Shackleton playing poker in the wardroom.

The pressure from the ice caused Endurance to start to take on water. To prevent the ship from flooding McNish built a cofferdam, caulking it with strips of blankets and nailing strips over the seams, standing for hours up to his waist in freezing water as he worked. He could not prevent the pressure from the ice crushing the ship though and was experienced enough to know when to stop trying. Once the ship had been breached he was put in charge of rescuing the stores from what had been The Ritz. With McNish in charge it took only a couple of hours to open the deck far enough to retrieve a good quantity of provisions.

=== On the ice ===
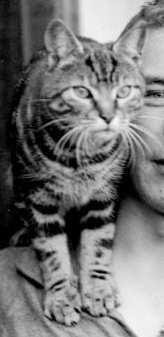
McNish's cat, Mrs Chippy, had to be killed after the ship was destroyed.

During his watch one night while the crew were camped on the ice, a small part of the ice floe broke away and he was only rescued due to the quick intervention of the men of the next watch who threw him a line allowing him to jump back to safety. Shackleton reported that McNish calmly mentioned his narrow escape the next day after further cracks appeared in the ice. After the loss of the Endurance, four of the sled dogs and Mrs Chippy, the cat McNish had brought on board, were shot on Shackleton's order due to his belief that keeping them alive in such harsh conditions would be an unnecessary drain on the crew's scarce resources, they would suffer from being underfed, and the crew could utilize the dog meat. McNish never forgave Shackleton for having his cat killed.

McNish proposed building a smaller craft from the wreckage of the ship, but was overruled, with Shackleton instead deciding to head across the ice to open water pulling the ship's three lifeboats. McNish had been suffering with piles and homesickness from almost before the voyage had begun, and once the ship was lost his frustration began to grow. He vented his feelings in his diary, targeting his tent-mates' language:

I have been shipmates with all sorts of men both in sail and steam, but never nothing like some of our party – as the most filthy language is used as terms of endearment, and, worse of all, is tolerated.

In great pain while pulling sledges across the ice, McNish briefly rebelled, refusing to take his turn in the harness and protesting to Frank Worsley that since the Endurance had been destroyed the crew was no longer under any obligation to follow orders. Accounts vary as to how Shackleton handled this: some report that he threatened to shoot McNish; others that he read him the ship's articles, making it clear that the crew were still under obligation until they reached port. McNish's assertion would have normally been correct: duty to the master (and pay) normally stopped when a ship was lost, but the articles the crew had signed for the Endurance had a special clause inserted in which the crew agreed "to perform any duty on board, in the boats, or on the shore as directed by the master and owner". Consequently, McNish really had no choice but to comply: he could not survive alone and could not continue with the rest of the party unless he obeyed orders.

As supplies began to dwindle the party grew hungry. McNish records that he smoked himself sick trying to alleviate the pangs of hunger and although he thought the shooting of the dogs terribly sad, he was happy to eat the meat they provided stating "Their flesh tastes a treat. It is a big treat for us after being so long on seal meat."

When the ice finally brought the camp to the edge of the pack ice, Shackleton decided that the three boats, the James Caird, Stancomb Wills, and Dudley Docker, should make initially for Elephant Island. McNish had prepared the boats as best he could for a long journey in the open ocean, building up their freeboard to improve their seakeeping ability.

=== Elephant Island and the James Caird ===
On the sea journey to Elephant Island, McNish was in the James Caird with Shackleton and Frank Wild. As they approached the island, Wild, who had been at the tiller for 24 hours straight, was close to collapse, so Shackleton ordered McNish to relieve him. McNish was not in a much better state himself and, despite the terrible conditions, he fell asleep after half an hour. The boat swung around and a huge wave drenched him. This was enough to wake him, but Shackleton, seeing McNish too was exhausted, ordered him to be relieved.

After the crew had made it to Elephant Island, Shackleton decided to take a small crew and make for South Georgia, where there was a possibility that they would find sailors from the whaling ships to help effect a rescue for the rest of the men. McNish was called upon by Shackleton to make the James Caird seaworthy for the long voyage and was selected as part of the crew, possibly because Shackleton was afraid of the effect he would have on morale if left behind with the other men. For his part, McNish seemed happy to go; he was unimpressed by the island and the chances of survival for the men overwintering there:

I don't think there are ever many fine days on this forlorn island... I dont think there will be many survivers if they have to put in a winter here. [sic]

McNish used the mast from the Stancomb Wills, to strengthen the Caird’s keel and build up the small 22 foot (6.7 m) long boat, so it would withstand the seas during the 800 mile (1480 km) trip. He caulked it using a mixture of seal blood and flour, and, using wood and nails taken from packing cases and the runners of the sledges, he built a makeshift frame which was then covered with canvas. Shackleton was worried the boat "bore a strong likeness to stage scenery", only giving the appearance of sturdiness. He later admitted that the crew could not have lived through the voyage without it.

When launching the boat McNish and John Vincent were thrown from the deck into the sea. Although soaked, both were unharmed, and managed to exchange some clothes with the Elephant Island party before the James Caird set off. The mood on board was buoyant and McNish recorded in his diary on 24 April 1916:

We took Good bye with our companions. & set sail on our 870 miles to South Georgia for assistance...we were in the open sea wet through but happy through it all.

The mood did not last though: conditions aboard the small craft during the trip were terrible, with the crew constantly soaked and cold. McNish impressed Shackleton with his ability to bear up under the strain (more so than the younger Vincent, who collapsed from exhaustion and cold). The six men split into two watches of four hours: three of the men would handle the boat while the other three lay beneath the canvas decking attempting to sleep. McNish shared a watch with Shackleton and Crean. All the men complained of pains in their legs and, on the fourth day out from Elephant Island, McNish suddenly sat down and removed his boots, revealing his legs and feet were white and puffy with the early signs of trench foot. On seeing the state of McNish's feet Shackleton ordered all the men to remove their boots.

=== South Georgia ===
The crew of the James Caird reached South Georgia on 10 May 1916, 15 days after setting out from Elephant Island. They landed in Cave Cove on King Haakon Bay; it was on the wrong side of the island, but it was a relief for all of them to make land; McNish wrote in his diary:

I went to the top of the hill & had a lay on the grass & it put me in mind of old times at Home sitting on the hillside looking down at the sea.

They found albatross chicks and seals to eat, but despite the relative comfort of the island compared to the small boat, they still urgently needed to reach the whaling station at Husvik on the other side of the island to fetch help for the men on Elephant Island. It was clear that McNish and Vincent could not continue, so Shackleton left them in the care of Timothy McCarthy camped in the upturned James Caird, and with Worsley and Crean made the hazardous trip over the mountains. McNish took screws from the James Caird and attached them to the boots of the men making the journey to help them grip the ice. He also fashioned a crude sledge from driftwood he found on the beach, but it proved too clumsy to be practical. When Shackleton's party set off on 18 May 1916, McNish accompanied them for a few hundred yards but he was unable to go any further. He shook hands with each of the men, wishing them good luck, and then Shackleton sent him back. Putting McNish in command of the remaining men, Shackleton charged him to wait for relief and if none had come by the end of winter to attempt to sail to the east coast. Once Shackleton's party had crossed the mountains and arrived in Husvik, he sent Worsley with one of the whaler's ships, Samson, to pick up McNish and the other men. After seeing the emaciated and drawn McNish on his arrival at the whaling station, Shackleton recorded that he felt that the rescue had come just in time for him.

== Polar Medal ==
Whatever the true story of the rebellion on the ice, neither Worsley nor McNish ever mentioned the incident in writing. Shackleton omitted it entirely from South, his account of the expedition, and referred to it only tangentially in his diary: "Everyone working well except the carpenter. I shall never forget him in this time of strain and stress". The event was recorded in the ship's log, but the log entry was struck during the sea voyage in the James Caird, Shackleton being impressed by the carpenter's show of "grit and spirit". Nevertheless, McNish's name appeared on the list of the four men not recommended for the Polar Medal in the letter sent by Shackleton on his return. Macklin thought the denial of the medal unjustified:

I was disheartened to learn that McNeish, Vincent, Holness and Stephenson had been denied the Polar Medal...of all the men in the party no-one more deserved recognition than the old carpenter....I would regard the withholding of the Polar Medal from McNeish as a grave injustice.

— Macklin

Macklin believed that Shackleton may have been influenced in his decision by Worsley who shared a mutual enmity with McNish, and had accompanied Shackleton back from Antarctica. Members of the Scott Polar Research Institute, New Zealand Antarctic Society and Caroline Alexander, the author of Endurance, have criticised Shackleton's denial of the award to McNish.

== Later life, memorials and records ==
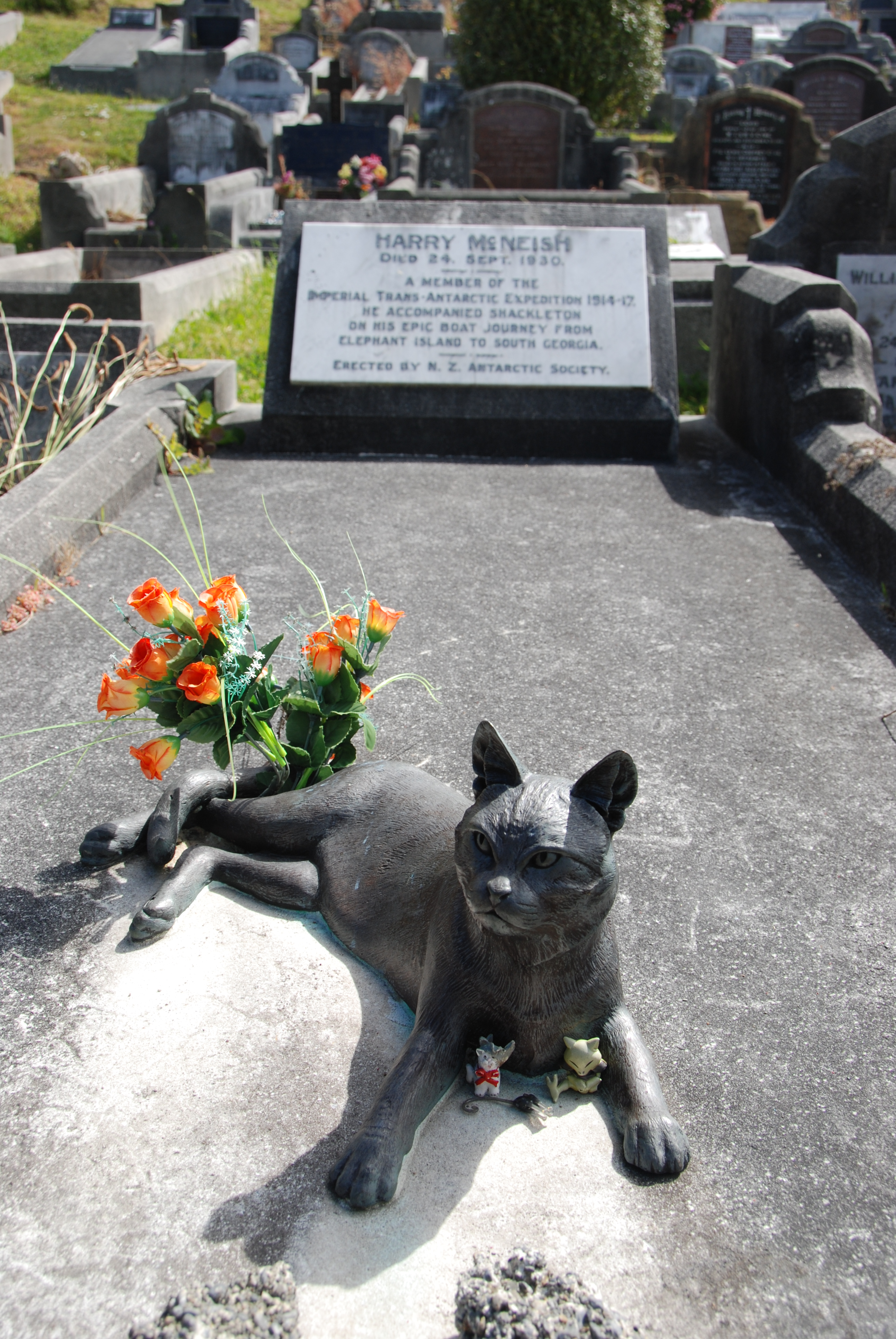
McNish's grave in Karori Cemetery with the statue of Mrs Chippy which was added by the New Zealand Antarctic Society. His last name is here spelled "McNeish".

After the expedition McNish returned to the Merchant Navy, working on various ships. He often complained that his bones permanently ached due to the conditions during the journey in the James Caird; he would reportedly sometimes refuse to shake hands because of the pain. He divorced Lizzie Littlejohn on 2 March 1918, by which time he had already met his new partner, Agnes Martindale. McNish had a son named Tom and Martindale had a daughter named Nancy. Although she is mentioned frequently in his diary, it appears McNish was not Nancy's father.

He spent 23 years in the Navy in total during his life, but eventually secured a job with the New Zealand Shipping Company. After making five trips to New Zealand he moved there in 1925, leaving behind his wife^{[d]} and all of his carpentry tools. He worked on the waterfront in Wellington until his career was ended by an injury. Destitute, he would sleep in the wharf sheds under a tarpaulin and relied on monthly collections from the dockworkers. He was found a place in the Ohiro Benevolent Home, but his health continued to deteriorate and he died on 24 September 1930, aged 56, in Wellington Hospital.

He was buried in Karori Cemetery, Wellington, on 26 September 1930, with full naval honours; HMS Dunedin (which happened to be in port at the time) provided twelve men for the firing party and eight bearers. However, his grave remained unmarked for almost thirty years; the New Zealand Antarctic Society (NZAC) erected a headstone on 10 May 1959. In 2001, it was reported that the grave was untended and surrounded by weeds. However, in 2004 the grave was tidied and a life size bronze sculpture of McNish's beloved cat, Mrs Chippy, was placed on his grave by NZAC, having been paid for by public subscription. His grandson, Tom, believes this tribute would have meant more to him than receiving the Polar Medal.

In 1958, the British Antarctic Survey named a small island in his honour, McNeish Island, which lies in the approaches to King Haakon Bay, South Georgia. The island was renamed McNish Island in 1998 after his birth certificate was presented to the United Kingdom Antarctic Place-Names Committee.

On 18 October 2006, a small oval wall plaque commemorating his achievements was unveiled at the Port Glasgow Library in his home town, and earlier in the same year he was the subject of an exhibition at the McLean Museum, Greenock. His journals are held in the Alexander Turnbull Library in Wellington, New Zealand.

== In popular culture ==
McNish was portrayed by Leonard Maguire in the 1983 television series Shackleton, by Ken Drury in the 2002 television miniseries Shackleton, and by William Hemming in the 2012 documentary Shackleton's Captain.

== Notes ==
a. For the location of McNish's birth, see map.

b. There was little doubt as to his skill as a shipwright even before he was called upon for the modifications to the boats. He was never seen to take measurements, producing perfect work by eye. Macklin commented that all the work he did was first class, and even Thomas Orde-Lees, who disliked him, grudgingly admitted he was an "expert wooden ship's man".

c. "Mrs" Chippy was discovered to be a male a month after the voyage started, but by that time the name had stuck.

d. "Wife" in this source probably refers to Agnes Martindale, who was his partner but not his wife. McNish was already divorced by this time.
