= Ernest Holness =

English marine engine stoker (1892–1924)

Albert Ernest Holness (7 December 1892 – 20 September 1924) was an English marine engine stoker. He is best known for his service in the Imperial Trans-Antarctic Expedition of 1914–1916.

== Biography ==
Holness was born on 7 December 1892 in Kingston-upon-Hull. At age 21 in 1914, he signed articles and shipped aboard the Endurance as a tender of the coal fire maintained on the vessel. Although the Endurance was rigged as a barquentine, it also had a coal-burning engine and spent much of its time under steam. Working under the orders issued by chief engineer Lewis Rickinson and second engineer Alexander Kerr, Holness shared the responsibility of physically maintaining the engine fires and stoking them with fresh coal. The exploration ship steamed southward until within 200 miles (320 km) of its destination on the Antarctic coastline. In January 1915, harsh pack ice took the vessel in a grip that would never be loosened. Holness's duties moved from stoker-fireman to ship's crew member in a battle for survival.

With the other castaways from the Endurance, Holness was forced to abandon the crushed ship as it fought its final battle with the ice. The exploration party, led by Sir Ernest Shackleton, camped on ice floes that drifted north through the Weddell Sea. As their solid refuge melted under their feet, Holness and the other men of the expedition faced constant dangers. At one point a pancake-shaped plate of ice, on which the castaways had built a flimsy camp, physically split in two directly under Holness's tent and sleeping bag. The fireman fell into the cold water and was personally rescued by Shackleton. The ice continued to melt and the expedition members took to open lifeboats. After a dangerous open-boat journey, the party made land at Elephant Island off the coast of the Antarctic Peninsula. The Elephant Island party was rescued in August 1916.

Upon returning to Britain, Holness married Lillian Bettles and fathered three children. He continued his career in the British merchant navy, serving in trawlers on the North Sea. Tragically, Holness was washed overboard while at sea on 20 September 1924. The incident occurred near the Faroe Islands. Holness was only 31 when he disappeared.

== Legacy ==
With his fellow fireman-stoker William Stephenson, Holness was one of four members of the Endurance crew to be denied the Polar Medal. The reasons, if any, for expedition leader Shackleton's failure to recommend Holness for this honor are unknown.
