= Arthur Dorman (cricketer) =

English cricketer and clergyman

Personal information
- Full name: Arthur William Dorman
- Born: 24 October 1862; Sydenham, Kent, England
- Died: 7 January 1914 (aged 51); Hinton Charterhouse, Somerset, England
- Batting: Unknown
- Bowling: Slow left-arm orthodox

Domestic team information
- Years: Team
- 1886: Cambridge University

Career statistics
Competition	First-class
Matches	8
Runs scored	31
Batting average	4.42
100s/50s	–/–
Top score	15
Balls bowled	1,551
Wickets	25
Bowling average	26.20
5 wickets in innings	1
10 wickets in match	–
Best bowling	5/55
Catches/stumpings	6/–
- Source: Cricinfo, 4 August 2020

Arthur William Dorman (24 October 1862 – 7 January 1914) was an English first-class cricketer and clergyman.

The son of Charles Dorman, he was born at Sydenham in October 1862. He was educated at Dulwich College, before going up to Corpus Christi College, Cambridge, in 1882. While studying at Cambridge, he played first-class cricket for Cambridge University in 1886, making seven appearances. Playing as a slow left-arm orthodox bowler who was described by Wisden Cricketers' Almanack as “a first-rate left-handed bowler, with a high delivery and good break”, he took 24 wickets in his seven matches for Cambridge at an average of 25.29. He took one five wicket haul, with figures of 5 for 55 against Yorkshire at Fenner's, a match in which he took overall figures of 9 for 103. Dorman also played for the Gentlemen in the Gentlemen v Players fixture of 1886.

After graduating from Cambridge, Dorman took holy orders in the Church of England in 1890, becoming a deacon at Ripon Cathedral and a priest there in 1891. His first proper ecclesiastical posting was at Knaresborough, where he was curated in 1891. Dorman moved south to Wiltshire in the same year, becoming the curate at Road until 1893. He was curate at St Bartholomew's Church in his home town from 1893 to 1898, before moving to the West Country to take up the post of vicar at Hinton Charterhouse, Somerset. He was vicar there until his death in January 1914.

He was the brother of Emily Shackleton, wife of renowned explorer Ernest Shackleton, who was a regular visitor to the Vicarage in Hinton Charterhouse. It is said in Shackleton's official biography that he was "saddened by the death of his wife's kindly brother, with whom he had spent so many quiet and happy week-ends at Hinton Charterhouse in the great days of popularity".
