= Kilkea and Moone =

Kilkea and Moone Cill Chá agus Maoin (Irish)
- Barony
- Interactive map of Kilkea and Moone
- Sovereign state: Ireland
- County: Kildare

Area
  - Total: 187.31 km^{2} (72.32 sq mi)

Kilkea and Moone (Irish: Cill Chá agus Maoin) is a barony in County Kildare, Ireland.

== Etymology ==
The barony takes its name from the villages of Kilkea (Cill Cathaigh, "Cathac's church") and Moone (Maen Colmcille, "Colm Cille's property").

== Location ==
Kilkea and Moone is located in southern County Kildare, reaching from Mullaghmast to the southern tip of the county, east of the Barrow and west of Sherriff Hill.

== History ==
Kilkea and Moone was the ancient lands of the Dál Chormaic.

Dál Chormaic - barony of Kilkea and Moone, represented by Uí Gabla, Uí Labrada, Uí Buide, and Cuthriage. The parts of Leinster belonging to the Clann Cormaic are Cuthraighe, Ua Trena, Ui Cruinn or Ui Cuinn, Ua Gabla Fine and Ua Gabla Roireann.

St. Abban (Abbán moccu Corbmaic (d.520) was of the Dál Cormaic (Uí Cormaic, along with his sister St. Gobnait.

== List of settlements ==
Below is a list of settlements in Kilkea and Moone:

- Castledermot
- Kilkea
- Moone
