= Emily Shackleton =

Wife of Antarctic explorer Sir Ernest Shackleton

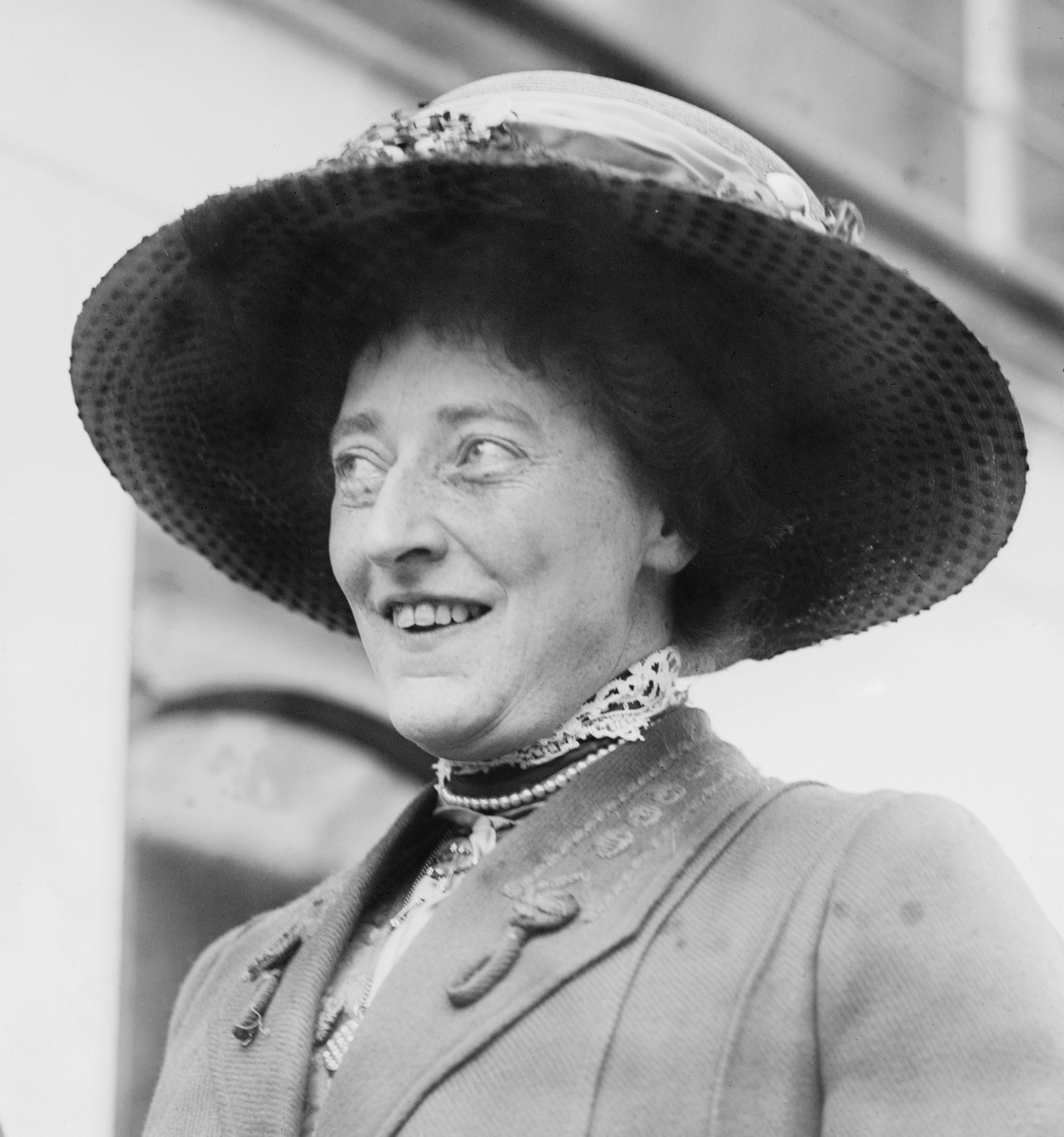
- Photo of Lady Shackelton
- Born: Emily Mary Dorman; 15 May 1868; Sydenham, Kent, England
- Died: 9 June 1936 (aged 68); Hampton Court Palace, London
- Spouse: Ernest Shackleton (m. 1904; died 1922)
- Children: 3, including Edward
- Relatives: Arthur Dorman (brother)

Emily Mary, Lady Shackleton (née Dorman; 15 May 1868 – 9 June 1936) was the wife of Antarctic explorer Sir Ernest Shackleton and the mother of Labour Party politician Edward Shackleton. In later life, she was involved in the Girl Guides movement. Her brother was cricketer Arthur Dorman.

== Early life ==
Emily Mary Dorman, later Lady Shackleton, was born into a large wealthy family in Sydenham, Kent. Her father was Charles Dorman of Wadhurst, East Sussex, and she was the youngest of six children, having four brothers and a sister.

On 9 April 1904, she married the polar explorer Ernest Shackleton and together they had three children.

== The era of Antarctic exploration ==
During their marriage, Emily's husband, Ernest, was frequently away on expeditions in the Antarctic. She was an important part of her husband's work, and used her social connections to generate the practical and financial support required to enable him to embark on the British Antarctic Expedition to the South Pole, and later the Imperial Transantarctic Expedition. In her husband's absence, she raised their family alone and lived on her independent income. She became interested in the Girl Guiding movement, which formally started around 1910, and she became the Eastbourne divisional Commissioner. The family also benefited from the generosity of philanthropist Janet Stancomb-Wills, who assisted in the financing of some of Sir Ernest Shackleton's expeditions. Family life continued in this way until the death of Sir Ernest Shackleton of a heart attack on the island of South Georgia, while en route to Antarctica during the Shackleton–Rowett Expedition.

== Later life ==
Following Sir Ernest's death in South Georgia, Emily worked to preserve and enhance his memory. She approached their family friend, Scottish meteorologist and geographer Hugh Robert Mill, to author the first full-length biography of Shackleton, with her cooperation. The book, "The Life of Sir Ernest Shackleton", was published in 1923. Sir Ernest's death had left her with debts, totalling approximately £1.5 million in modern terms, and she relied heavily on philanthropic support. Initially, albeit on a reduced budget, she remained in the family home in Eastbourne. However, eventually she moved to Coldwaltham in West Sussex, to live with her daughter. During her later years, she lived in a grace-and-favour apartment in Hampton Court, granted to her by King George V in 1929. After a long illness, Lady Shackleton died in 1936 and was buried at St Giles' Church, Coldwaltham.

== Popular culture ==
Emily Shackleton was played by the actress Phoebe Nicholls in the 2002 TV miniseries Shackleton, starring Kenneth Branagh as her husband, Sir Ernest Shackleton.

== Collections ==
The Emily Shackleton collection of papers is held at the Scott Polar Research Institute and comprises correspondence by Emily to family members and others connected with Antarctic exploration and an account of the royal visit to the Nimrod prior to the British Antarctic Expedition.

The National Portrait Gallery holds a bromide snapshot of Emily Shackleton by an unknown photographer, dated 1910.
