= Kilkea =

Village in County Kildare, Ireland

Kilkea Cill Chá
- Village
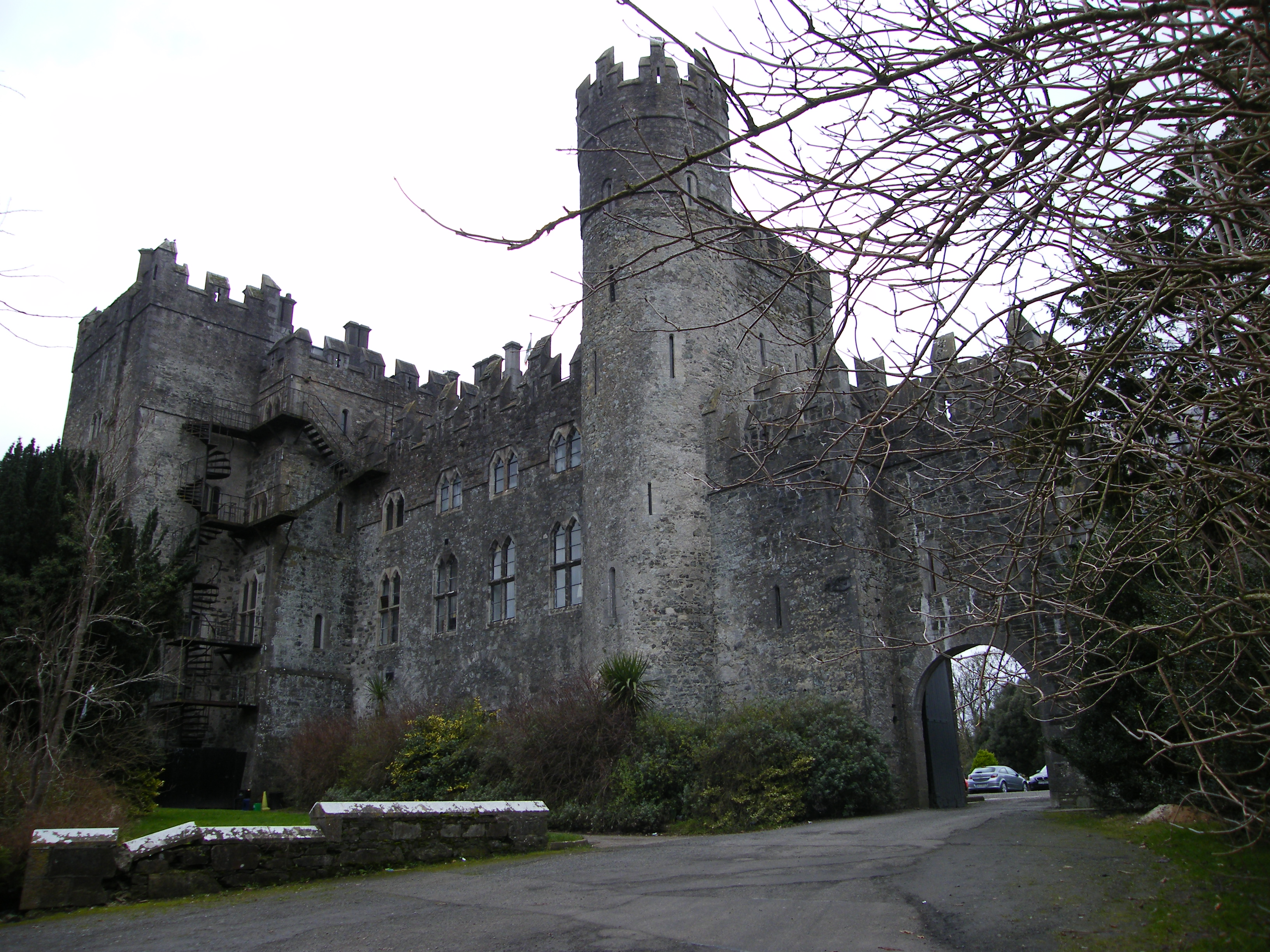
- Kilkea Castle

- Location in Ireland
- Coordinates: 52°56′52″N 6°53′34″W
- Country: Ireland
- Province: Leinster
- County: County Kildare
- Time zone: UTC+0 (WET)
  - Summer (DST): UTC-1 (IST (WEST))

Kilkea (Irish: Cill Chá) is a village and civil parish in County Kildare, Ireland, about 75 km (47 mi) from Dublin, and 15 km (9.3 mi) from the town of Carlow. The R418 regional road from Athy to Tullow passes through the village.

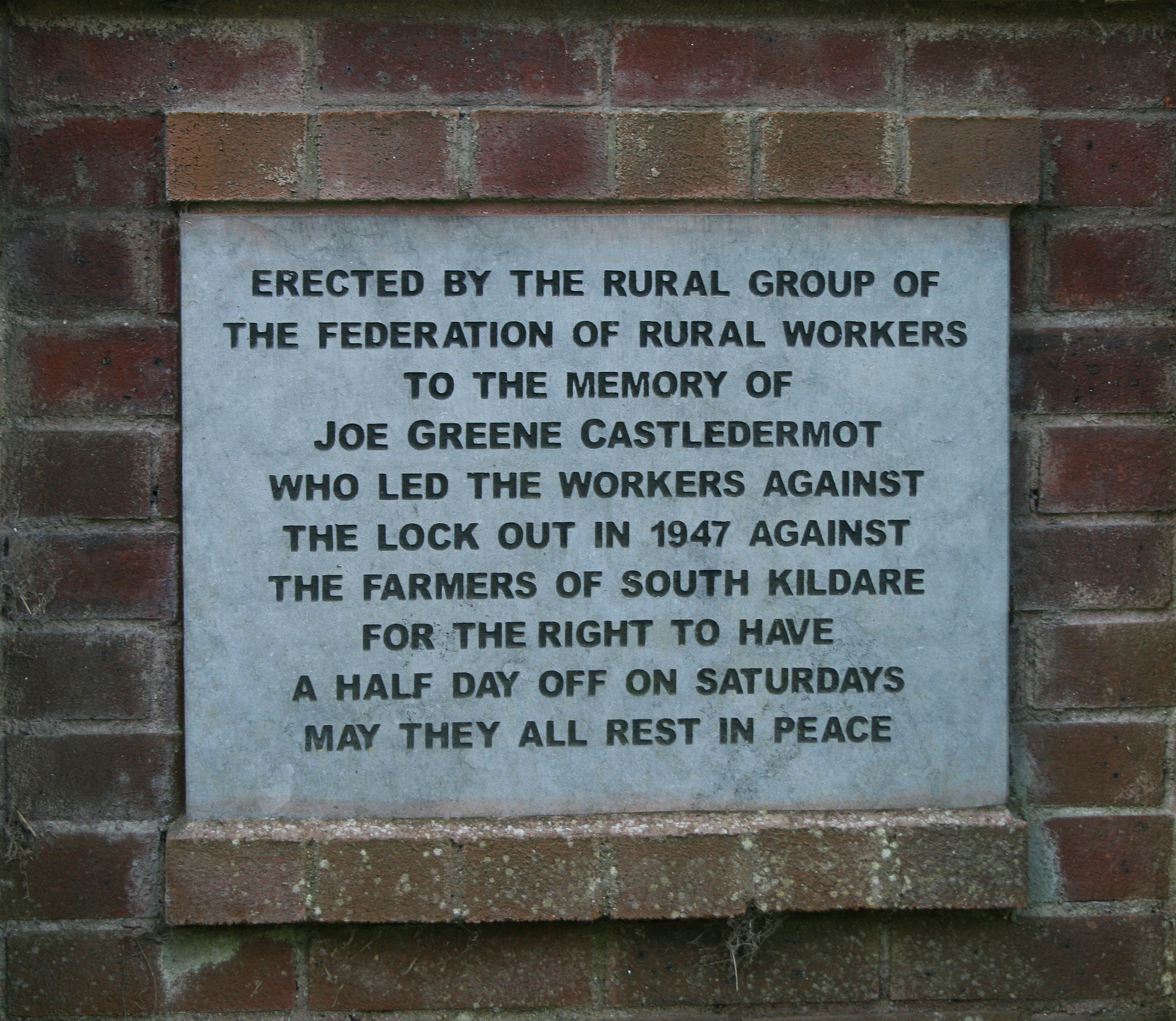
Memorial outside the village

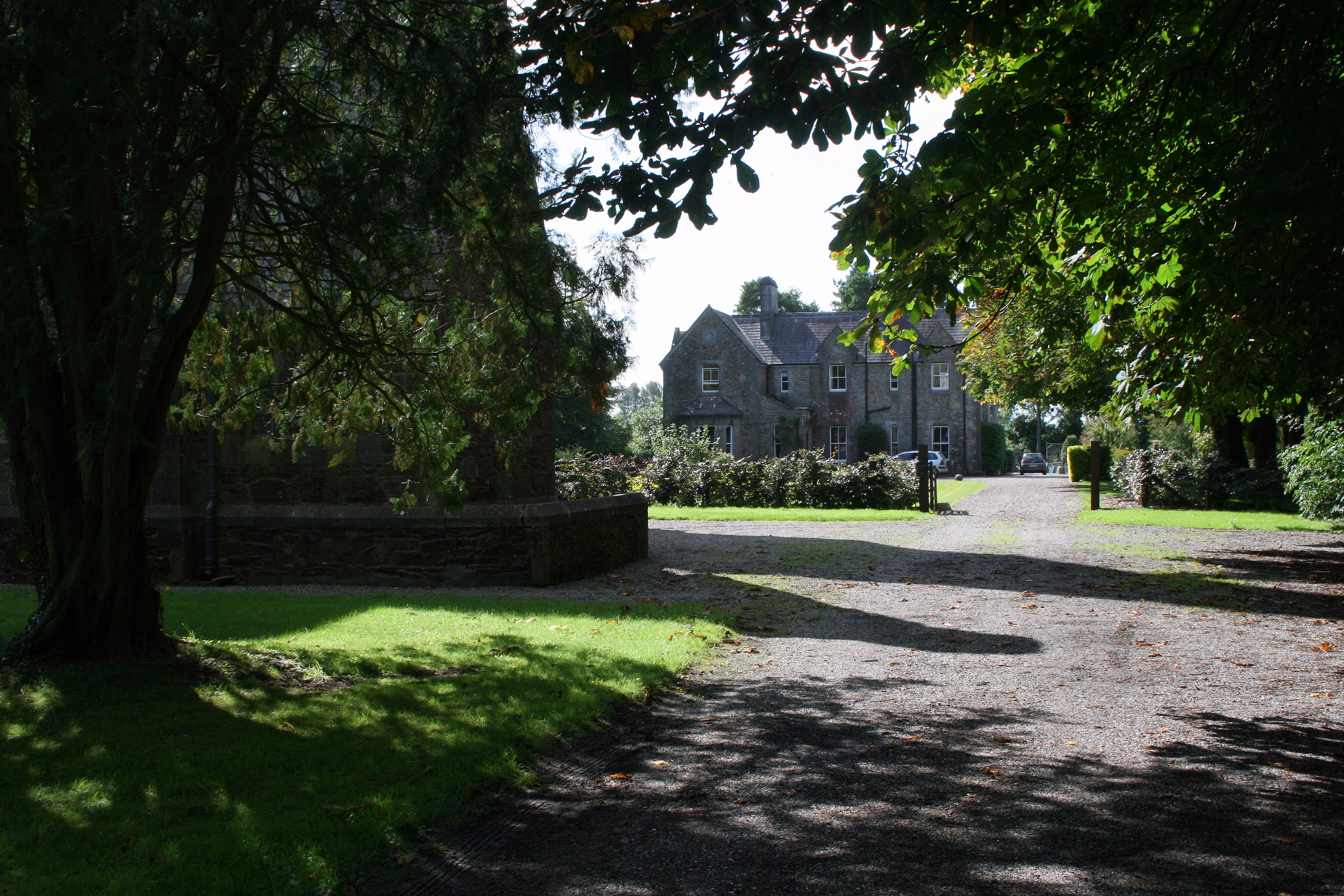
House in Kilkea

== History ==
Formerly the land of the Ó Tuathails (O'Toole), after the Norman invasion, Sir Walter de Riddlesford built a motte and bailey castle there about 1180. It is part of the barony of Kilkea and Moone. Walter de Riddlesford's granddaughter, Emmeline Longespee, married Maurice FitzGerald, 3rd Lord of Offaly in 1273, and so the land passed to the Geraldine Earls of Kildare. Its importance as a town diminished after the rebellion of "Silken Thomas", the 10th Earl of Kildare, in 1534.

== People ==
- Sir Ernest Shackleton (1874–1922), Antarctic explorer, was born and spent his childhood at Kilkea House.
- Lorcán Ua Tuathail (1128–1180), Archbishop of Dublin, was born in Kilkea

== See also ==
- Kilkea Castle
- Kilkea and Moone, the barony
- List of towns and villages in Ireland
