= Lorcán Ua Tuathail =

Irish saint and Archbishop (1128 – 1180)

Saint Lorcán Ua Tuathail Laurence O'Toole
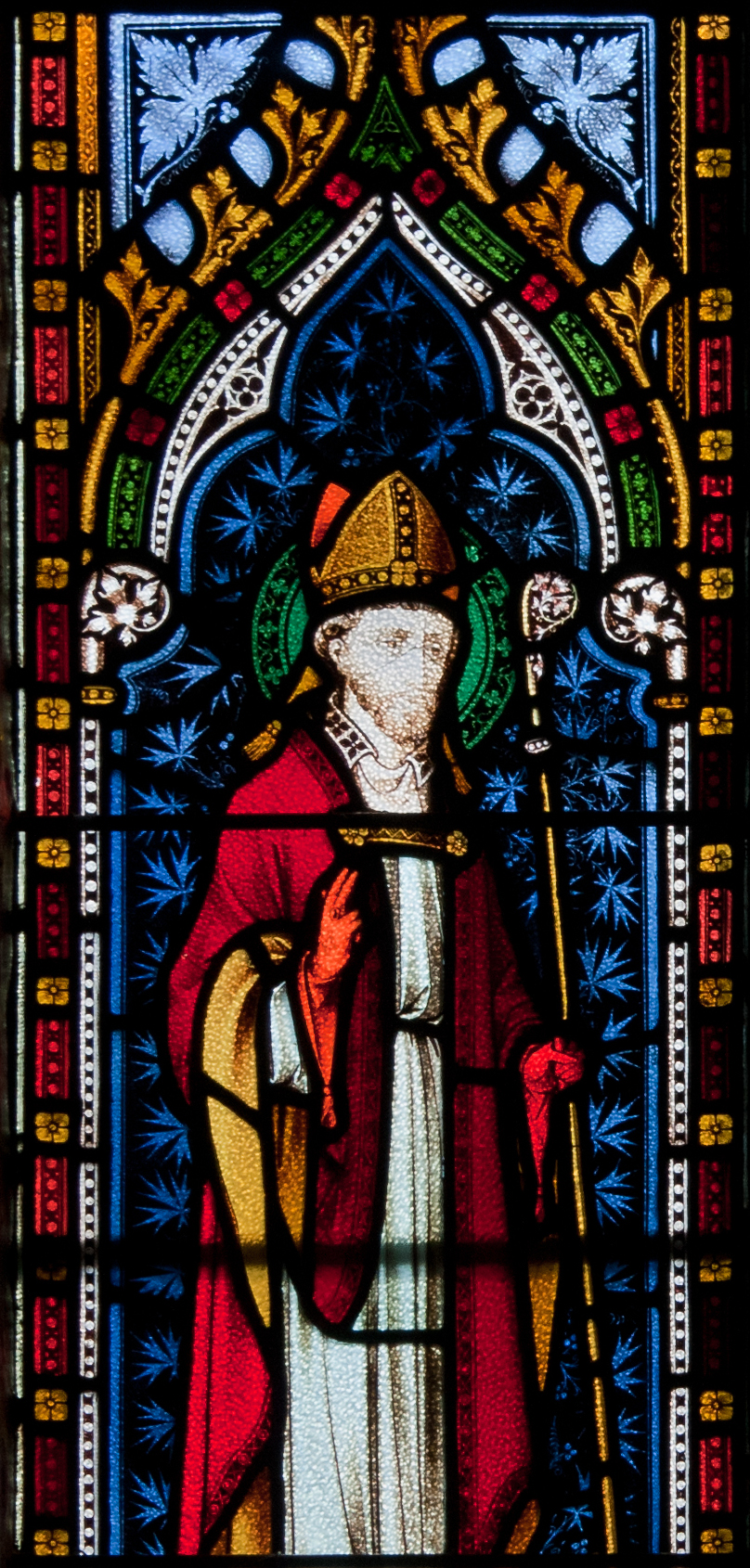

Archbishop
- Born: 1128; Kilkea, Ireland
- Died: 14 November 1180; Eu, Normandy, Angevin Empire
- Venerated in: Roman Catholic Church, Church of Ireland
- Canonized: 11 December 1225 by Pope Honorius III
- Major shrine: Collégiale Notre-Dame et Saint-Laurent, Eu, Normandy
- Feast: 14 November
- Patronage: Archdiocese of Dublin. Head injury

Lorcán Ua Tuathail, known in English as Laurence O'Toole and in French as Laurent d'Eu (1128 – 14 November 1180), was Archbishop of Dublin at the time of the Norman invasion of Ireland. Lorcán played a prominent role in the Irish Church Reform Movement of the 12th century and mediated between the parties during and after the invasion. He was canonised in 1225 by Pope Honorius III.

== Early life ==
Lorcán was born at Kilkea, County Kildare, Ireland, the youngest of four sons of King Muirchertach Ua Tuathail of the Uí Muiredaig, a branch of the Uí Dúnlainge dynasty. However, Castledermot claims him as well.

His mother was an O'Byrne princess of the Uí Fáelán branch of the Uí Dúnlainge. The Uí Tuathail (O'Toole) take their surname from their ancestor Tuathal mac Augaire, King of Leinster, who died in 958. They resided at Maistiu (Mullaghmast) in what is now County Kildare.

By the time of his son's birth King Muirchertach was subordinate to the new over-kings from South Leinster, of the Uí Ceinnselaig. The king from 1126 was Diarmait Mac Murchada (Dermot MacMurrough). At the age of 10, Lorcán was sent to Diarmait as a hostage for his father. However, at one point Muirchertach's loyalty to Diarmait must have become suspect, because Lorcán was imprisoned for some two years in extreme austerity and barely given enough to live on. Due to the intercession of the abbot of Glendalough – members of Lorcán's family had been buried at one of its churches for generations – relations were amicably restored between Diarmait and Muirchertach.

One result of his confinement was the strengthening of Lorcán's wish to enter the religious life. The story goes that when Muirchertach arrived at Glendalough for Lorcán, he stated that he would draw lots to have one of his sons made a priest, at which Lorcán laughed as he had long thought of doing so. No lots were drawn, and Lorcán stayed at Glendalough.

== Abbot of Glendalough ==
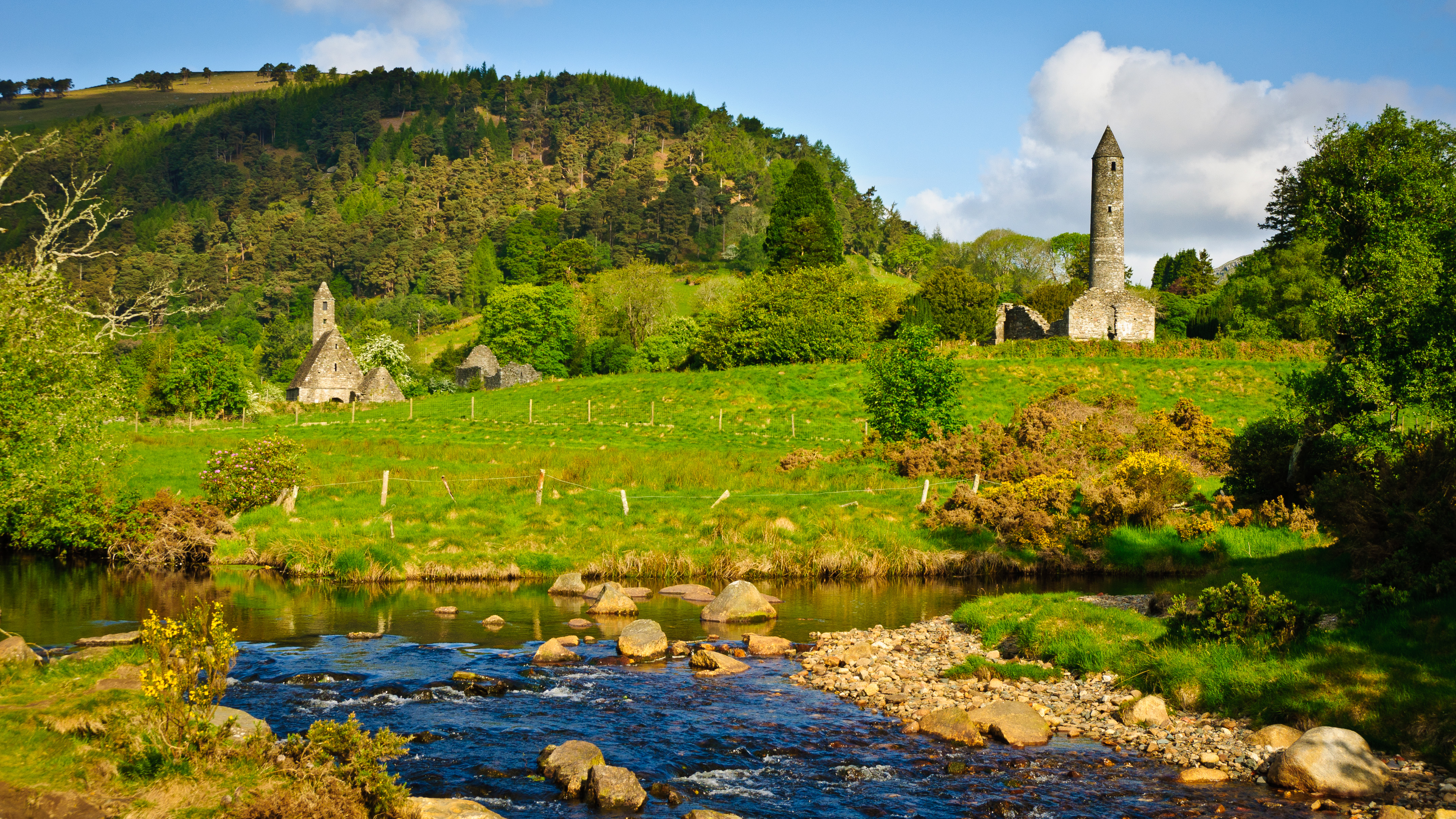
Glendalough, County Wicklow, Ireland

In time he rose to become Abbot of Glendalough at the age of 26 in 1154. Lorcán was a religious reformer. He wished to strengthen the bonds between the Irish Church and Rome. Through his own example Lorcán brought his spiritual renewal to the church in Ireland and married the best in the Gaelic monastic movement with the best in the Frankish-European liturgical monastic movement.

Lorcán began a spiritual renewal programme among the monks of the Abbey bringing the Gaelic Abbey of Glendalough in line with the Frankish Abbeys of Continental Europe. He invited the Canons of St Augustine to come and assist in the reform of the Abbey and he became a member of the Augustinian Order himself.

A great famine raged during the first four months of his administration, and brigandage beset his community, even undertaken by noblemen. In the early thirteenth-century Life of St Lorcán, it was claimed Lorcán protected his community from brigandage through his solemn prayer, fasting, and miraculous cures. He was well regarded by both the community in Glendalough and its secular neighbours for sanctity and charity to the poor.

== Archbishop of Dublin ==
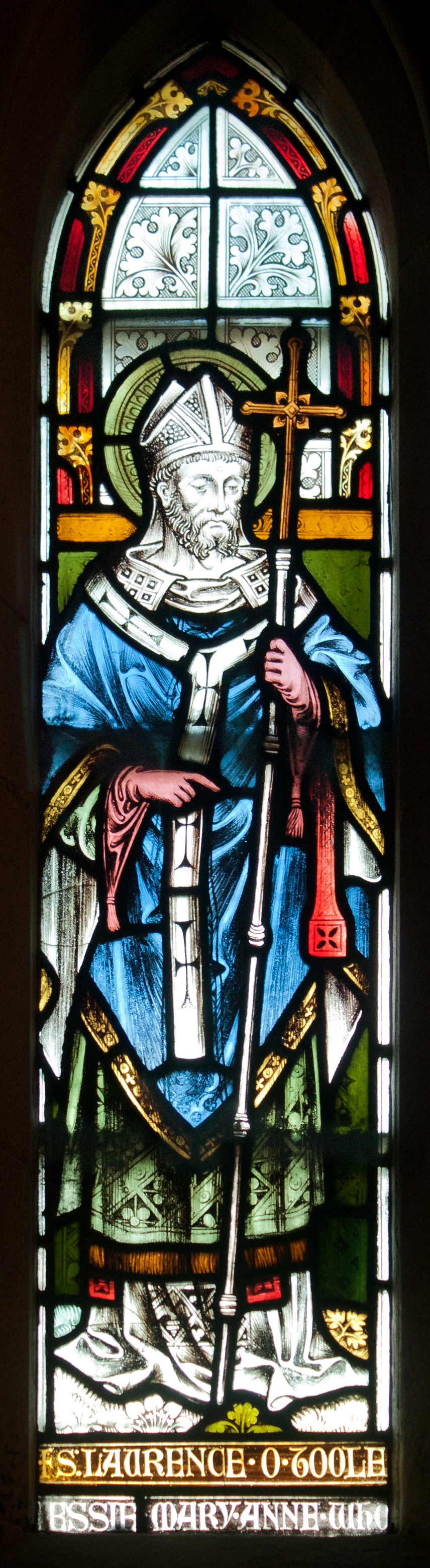
Baptistery window of Christ Church Cathedral, Dublin

When he was 32, following the death of Archbishop Gregory in 1162, he was elected unanimously Archbishop of Dublin at the Synod of Clane, and was consecrated by Gelasius, Archbishop of Armagh and successor of Máel Máedóc. He was the first Gael to be appointed to the See of a Hiberno-Norse city state; but it is notable that his nomination was backed not only by the High King Ruaidrí Ua Conchobair (Rory O'Connor), King Diarmait Mac Murchada (who had by then been married to Lorcán's sister, Mór); and the monastic community at Glendalough, but also by the Hiberno-Norse clergy and laity of Dublin itself. He played a prominent part in the Irish Church Reform Movement of the 12th century, as well as repairing and rebuilding several parish churches and emphasising the use of Gregorian chant.

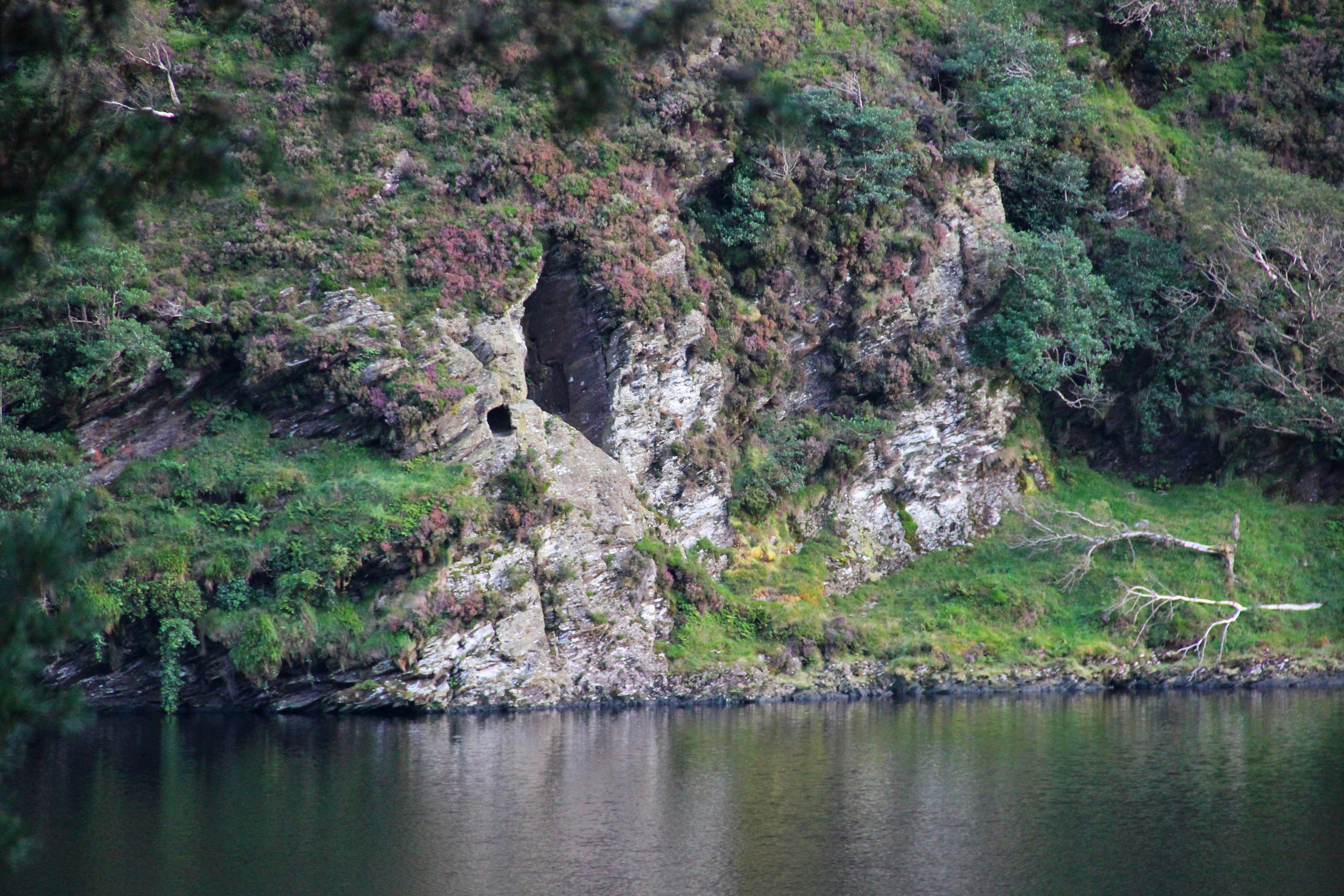
St Kevins Bed, Glendalough

As Archbishop of Dublin, Lorcán began a policy of church building and laid the foundation stone for the Cathedral of the Holy Trinity (now Christ Church). To assist in the spiritual formation of the priests and people of the Diocese Lorcán invited the Augustinian Order to become part of the Cathedral Chapter of the Holy Trinity. In a city that was in the middle of an economic boom, Lorcán, as Archbishop, was seen as the one who stretched out his hand to care for the poor and the neglected. There was appalling poverty in the city at the time and each day Lorcán fed the poor of the city in his home. He also established care centres for the children who had been abandoned by their parents or who were orphaned in the city.

Lorcán frequently made choice of Glendalough for his retreats; but he usually hid himself in a solitary cave at some distance from the monastery, between a rock and a deep lake, which Kevin of Glendalough had used.

== The Norman invasion ==
In 1166, Lorcán's brother-in-law Diarmait was deposed as King of Leinster by an alliance of Irish kings and princes, led by High King Ruaidrí Ua Conchobair (Rory O'Connor) and King Tighearnán Mór Ua Ruairc of Breifne. Diarmait had in 1152 abducted Dervorguilla, Ua Ruairc's wife and on the death of Diarmait's protector, High King Muirchertach Mac Lochlainn in 1166, he paid the price. Exiled and with only a half-hearted promise of help from Henry II of England, after much wandering in Wales, England and France, he returned to Ireland with a group of penniless and down-on-their-luck Norman, Flemish and Welsh allies to help him regain his kingdom.

Dublin was a walled city, but the Hiberno-Norse citizens were terrified by the Norman knights and men-at-arms, as well as the stories that were being told of their brutality. Lorcán O'Toole's house was besieged by people imploring him to save them and to make a treaty with the Anglo-Normans. The Archbishop went out to the foreigners' camp. While he appealed to them, two Norman knights with their followers made a breach in the walls and entered the city. They burned houses and killed the unarmed civilian population. The noise and tumult reached the camp and so Lorcán heard of the massacre. He hurried back to Dublin and succeeded in stopping the slaughter.

The invasion succeeded beyond Diarmait's wildest dreams; he was reinstated as King of Leinster, the Hiberno-Norse city-states of Wexford, Waterford and Dublin were captured, and the Irish clans under the High King were defeated. To seal the alliance, Diarmait offered his daughter, Aoife Ruadh – who was also Lorcán's niece – in a dynastic marriage to the leader of the Normans, Strongbow.

The last years of Lorcán's life were defined by these events and those that were consequent upon it. He had been in negotiations with Diarmait when he and his allies laid siege to Dublin after a band of Norman knights seized the town. He acted again as mediator when Ascall mac Ragnaill, the last King of Dublin, returned with an army from the Isle of Man and the Hebrides and fought in vain to recapture his kingdom and again when Ua Conchobair laid siege.

Lorcán was now a national figure greatly in demand as a mediator by all sides. Gaels, Hiberno-Norse, and Normans, regarded him as an important mediator.

== Synod of Cashel ==
The arrival of Henry II of England as Lord of Ireland in Dublin on 11 November 1171 served a number of purposes: first, to rein in his erstwhile Norman subjects before they established a rival Norman kingdom of their own; second, to receive the submission of the Irish kings and princes; third, to arrange a synod at Cashel. This was to bring Ireland in line with Catholic Church observances as practised in Henry's other domains in England and France. Two of the statutes proclaimed concerned the marriage laws of the Irish clergy and the granting of the Rock of Cashel to the church. It was also used to try to bring the Church of Ireland under the jurisdiction of Canterbury and in the process Pope Alexander III confirmed Pope Adrian IV's donation of Ireland to Henry in 1172. The implications of all this only seems to have sunk in after Henry's departure in April 1172 and to this end Ua Conchobair sent Ua Tuathail – accompanied by Catholicus, Abbot of Clonfert – to London to negotiate a settlement with Henry.

== Treaty of Windsor ==
The Treaty of Windsor was a pact between Ua Conchobair and Henry II which acknowledged Henry's right to the Lordship of Leinster, Meath and such areas then occupied by his Norman subjects. Lorcán was able to get Henry to acknowledge Ua Conchobair's right to the High Kingship of Ireland and to his lands. However, in so doing, Lorcán had to cede Ua Conchobair's tribute to Henry. Some sources allege, however, that King Henry feared that Archbishop Lorcán might become another St. Thomas Becket.

During the negotiations, Lorcán was saying Mass at the tomb of St. Thomas Becket in Canterbury Cathedral when he was attacked by a man who struck Lorcán on the head with a club, before the altar. Unlike Becket, Ua Tuathail, though knocked to the ground, was able to stand back up and finish the mass. Officially, the assailant was a madman who had heard of the archbishop's reputation and had the idea of giving the Church another martyr; If King Henry was covertly involved in setting up this attack, however, he had clearly learned from the political fallout following the murder of Archbishop Becket how not to have it be as easily traced back to him.

== Last years and death in Normandy ==
Archbishop Lorcán left Ireland in 1179 to attend the Third Council of the Lateran in Rome, accompanied by five other bishops. From Pope Alexander III he received a papal bull, confirming the rights and privileges of the See of Dublin. Alexander also named him as papal legate. On his return to Ireland he kept up the pace of reform to such an extent that as many as 150 clerics were withdrawn from their offices for various abuses and sent to Rome.

Lorcán was described as tall and graceful in figure. He was well known as an ascetic, wore a hair shirt, never ate meat, and fasted every Friday on bread and water. In contrast to this, it is said that when he entertained, his guests lacked for nothing while he drank water coloured to look like wine so as not to spoil the feast. Each Lent he returned to Glendalough to make a forty days' retreat in St. Kevin's Cave on a precipice of Lugduff Mountain over the Upper Lake.

In 1180, he left Ireland for the last time, taking with him a son of Ua Conchobair's as a hostage to Henry. He meant to admonish Henry for incursions against Ua Conchobair, contrary to the Treaty of Windsor. After a stay at the Monastery of Abingdon south of Oxford – necessitated by a closure of the ports – he landed at Le Tréport, Normandy, at a cove named after him, Saint-Laurent. He fell ill and was conveyed to the Abbey of St. Victor at Eu. Mortally ill, it was suggested that he should make his will, to which he replied: "God knows, I have not a penny under the sun to leave anyone." His last thoughts were of the faithful in the Roman Catholic Archdiocese of Dublin: "Alas, you poor, foolish people, what will you do now? Who will take care of you in your trouble? Who will help you?" He died at Eu, Normandy on 14 November 1180, and was buried there.

== Veneration and relics ==
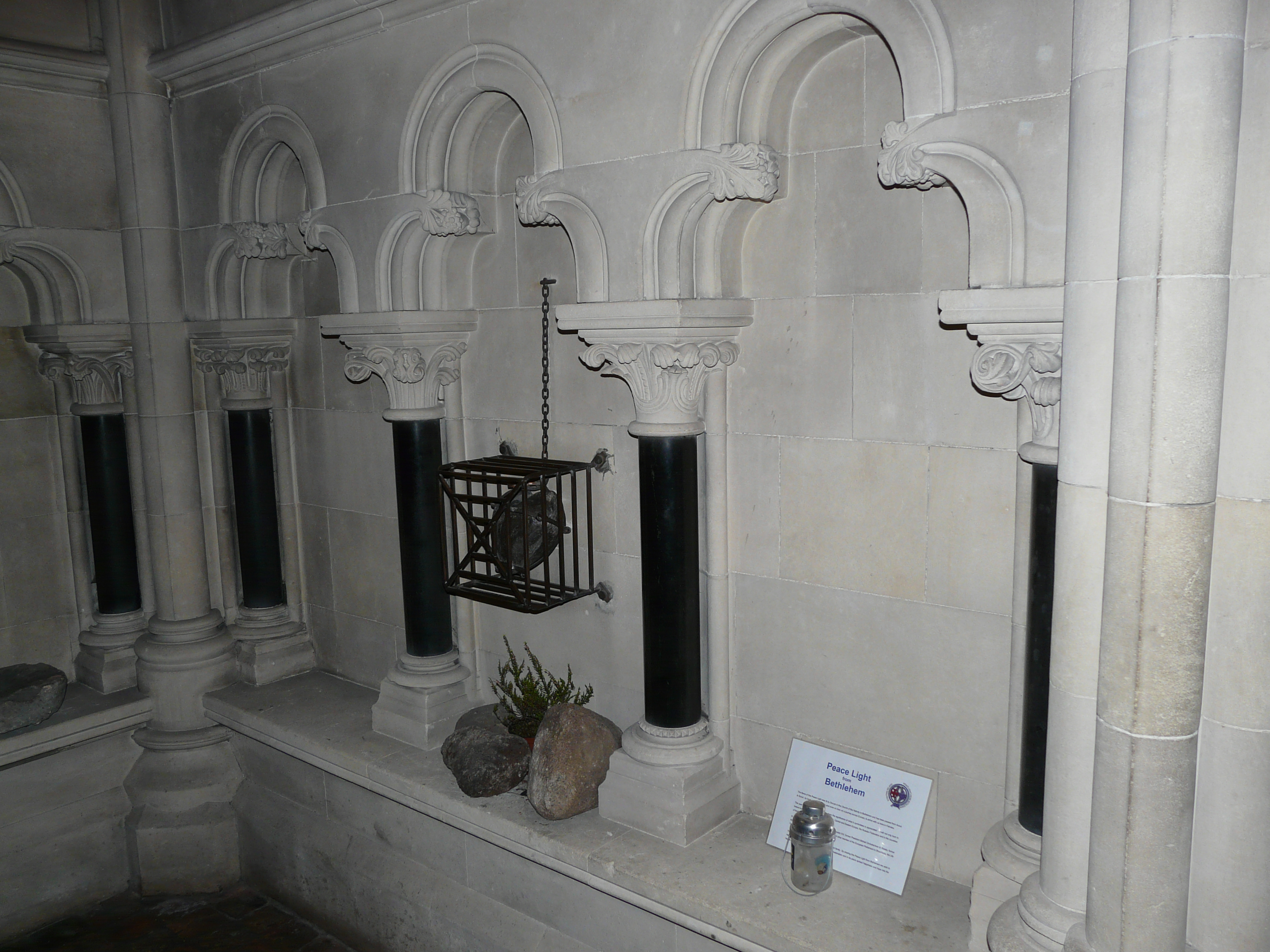
Ua Tuathail's heart in Christ Church Cathedral, Dublin

Due to the claimed great number of miracles that rapidly occurred either at his tomb or through his intercession, Lorcán was canonised by Pope Honorius III only 45 years after his death. Early devotees of Lorcán compared him with his martyred contemporary Thomas Becket, as a man who had suffered physical attacks for defending both his people from oppression and the independence of the Church from being lost to control by the State, and who had similarly held out the threats of divine curse and excommunication against the oppressors of both.

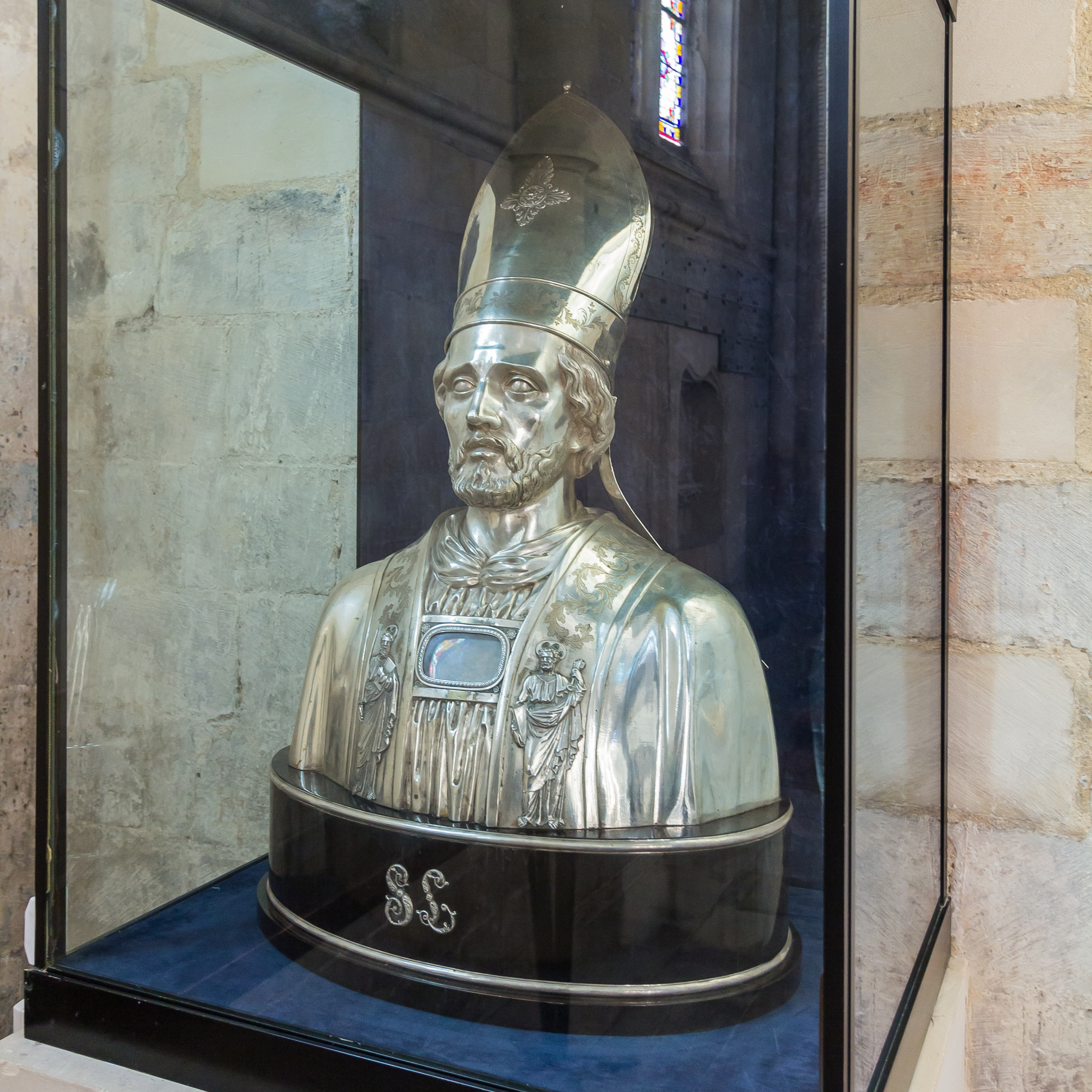
Relic of St Laurent O'Toole (Lorcán Ua Tuathail) in Collégiale Notre-Dame et Saint-Laurent, Eu, Normandy. It includes the skull of the Saint

In Eu, crowds of pilgrims coming to venerate and pray before his relics led to the construction of a magnificent new church there, the Collégiale Notre-Dame-et-Saint-Laurent d'Eu (Collegiate Church of Our Lady & St. Lorcán of Eu) where the recumbent figure (gisant) of Lorcán is the oldest preserved in the crypt. He is represented there with bearded face, mitre on his head, dressed in his vestments and priestly insignia. The gisant dates from the late 12th century and is among the oldest of its kind in France.

His skull was reportedly brought to England in 1442 by a nobleman named Sir Rowland Standish (relation of Myles Standish) who had fought at Agincourt. The bones were supposedly interred at the parish church of Chorley in England, now named St. Laurence's, until they disappeared in the English Reformation. However the Collégiale Notre-Dame-et-Saint-Laurent d'Eu still possesses a reliquary containing his skull.

Lorcán's heart was returned to Ireland and is preserved in a reliquary in Christ Church Cathedral, Dublin. Lorcán's heart remains in Christ Church Cathedral despite the Irish Reformation, although devotion to saints is more prominent in Roman Catholicism than in the Anglicanism of the Church of Ireland which owns the cathedral. The reliquary was stolen in 2012, with the Dean of Christ Church saying "It has no economic value, but it is a priceless treasure that links our present foundation with its founding father". It was recovered in Phoenix Park in 2018 after a tip-off to the Garda Síochána. Media reported that the unidentified thieves thought it was cursed and caused family members' illnesses. At a special evensong ceremony in Christ Church on 26 April 2018, archbishop Michael Jackson received the heart from a senior Garda.

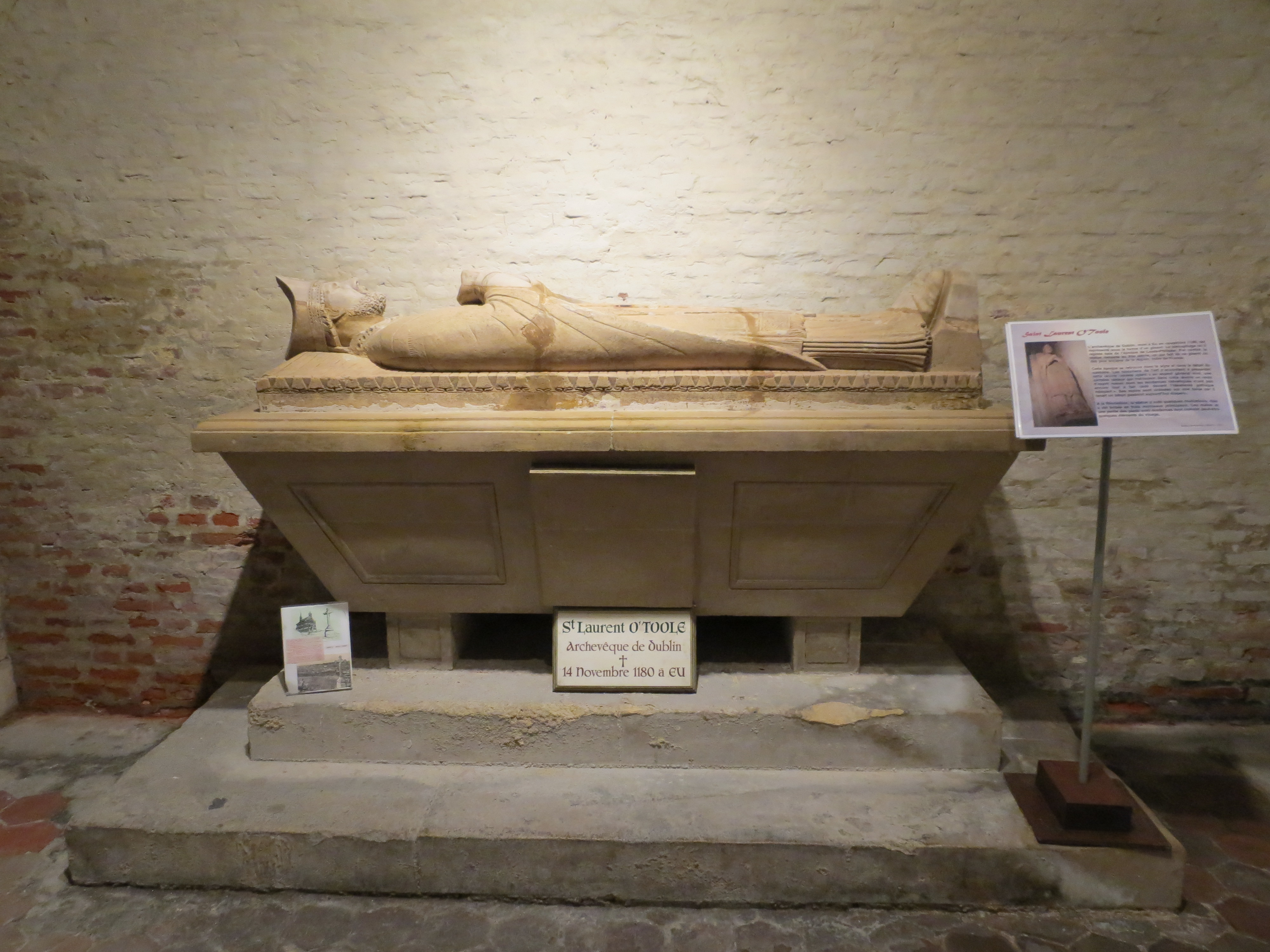
Tomb gisant of St. Lorcán Ua Tuathail, in the Collégiale Notre-Dame et Saint-Laurent, Eu, Normandy.

== See also ==
- Saint Laurence O'Toole, patron saint archive

== Bibliography ==
- Charles Plummer (ed.), ‘Vie et miracles de St Laurent, archevêque de Dublin [Life and miracles of St Laurence, archbishop of Dublin]’, Analecta Bollandiana, 33 (1914), 121-86, https://archive.org/details/sim_analecta-bollandiana_1914_33/page/121.
- Desmond Forristal, The man in the middle: St Laurence O'Toole, Patron Saint of Dublin (Dublin: Veritas, 1988).
- Marie Therese Flanagan, "Laurence [St Laurence, Lorcán Ua Tuathail, Laurence O’Toole] (c. 1128–1180)", Oxford Dictionary of National Biography (Oxford: Oxford University Press, 2004), vol. 32, pp. 691–93.
- Ailbhe MacShamhráin, ‘Ua Tuathail (O‘Toole), St. Lawrence [sic] (d.1180)’ in Seán Duffy (ed.), Medieval Ireland: an encyclopedia (New York and London: Routledge, 2005), 483-5.
- Ailbhe Mac Shamhráin, ‘Ua Tuathail, Lorcán (O’Toole, Laurence)’ in James McGuire & James Quinn (ed.), Dictionary of Irish Biography: from the earliest times to the year 2002 (9 vols., Cambridge: Royal Irish Academy and Cambridge University Press, 2009-).
- Jesse Harrington, "The curse of St. Laurence O'Toole", History Ireland (July / August 2018), pp. 18–21.
- Jesse Harrington, ‘Laurence O’Toole: Normandy’s Irish saint’, History Ireland, 33: 3 (May / June 2025)

Religious titles
Preceded by Gregory	Archbishop of Dublin; 1162–1180	Succeeded by John Comyn
