= Ernest Shackleton =

Anglo-Irish Antarctic explorer (1874–1922)

Sir Ernest Shackleton CVO OBE FRGS FRSGS
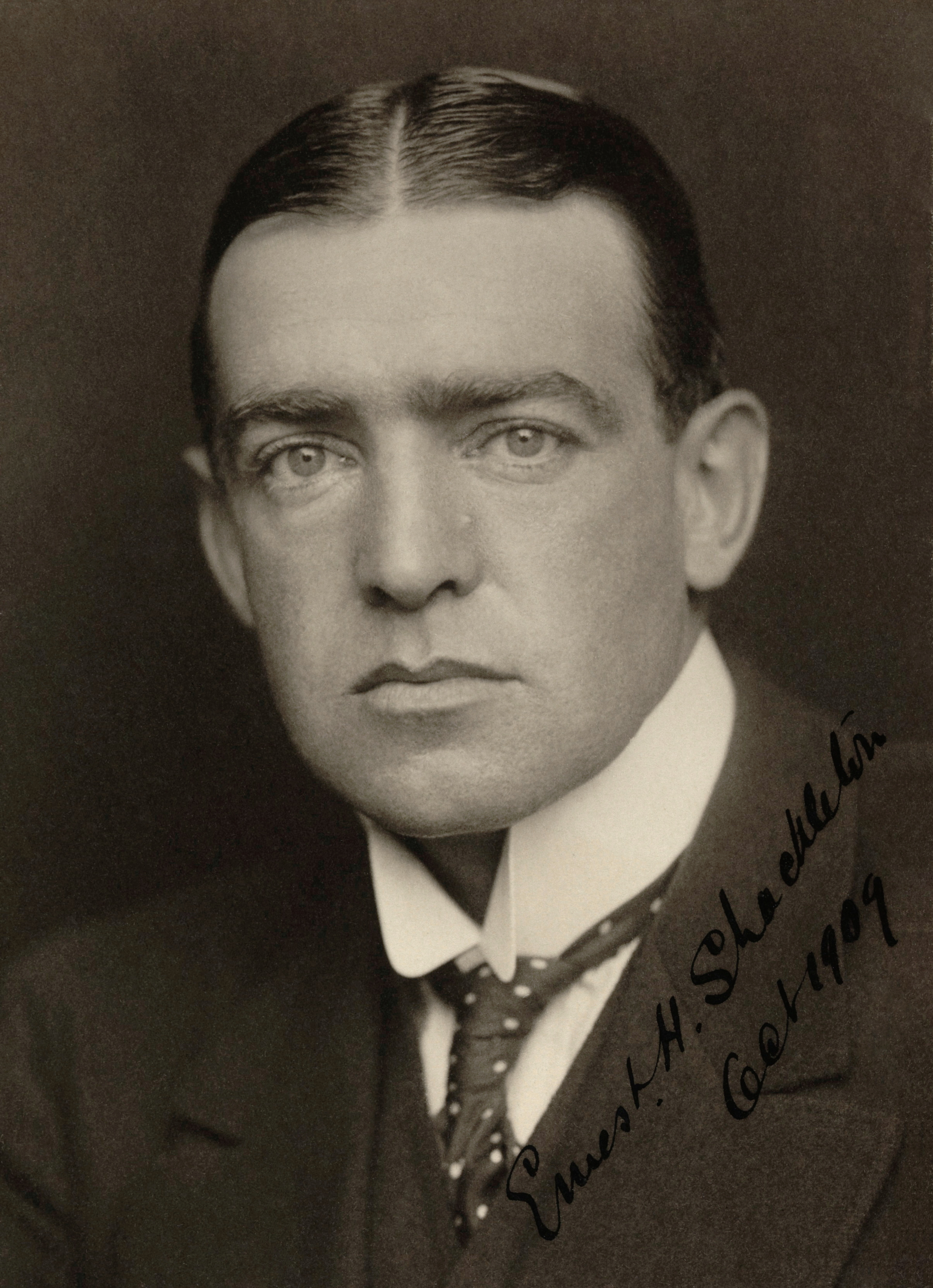
- Shackleton in 1904

Secretary of the Royal Scottish Geographical Society
- In office 11 January 1904 – 10 November 1905
- Preceded by: Frederick Marshman Bailey
- Succeeded by: William Lachlan Forbes

Personal details
- Born: Ernest Henry Shackleton; 15 February 1874 Kilkea, County Kildare, Ireland
- Died: 5 January 1922 (aged 47) Grytviken, South Georgia, Falkland Islands Dependencies
- Spouse: Emily Dorman (m. 1904)
- Children: Raymond; Cecily; Edward
- Relatives: Kathleen Shackleton (sister)
- Education: Dulwich College
- Awards: Knight Bachelor (1909); Commander of the Royal Victorian Order (1909; Member 4th Class: 1907); Officer of the Order of the British Empire (1918); Polar Medal with three clasps

Military service
- Allegiance: United Kingdom
- Branch: Royal Navy; British Army
- Service years: 1901–1904, 1917–1919
- Rank: Sub-lieutenant (RNR); Major
- Wars: World War I; Russian Civil War

Sir Ernest Henry Shackleton (15 February 1874 – 5 January 1922) was an Anglo-Irish Antarctic explorer who led three British expeditions to the Antarctic. He was one of the principal figures of the period known as the Heroic Age of Antarctic Exploration.

Born in Kilkea, County Kildare, Ireland, Shackleton and his Anglo-Irish family moved to Sydenham in suburban south London when he was ten. Shackleton's first experience of the polar regions was as third officer on Captain Robert Falcon Scott's Discovery expedition of 1901‍–‍1904, from which he was sent home early on health grounds, after he and his companions Scott and Edward Adrian Wilson set a new southern record by marching to latitude 82° S. During the Nimrod Expedition of 1907‍–‍1909, he and three companions established a new record Farthest South latitude of 88°23′ S, only 97 geographical miles (112 statute miles or 180 kilometres) from the South Pole, the largest advance to the pole in exploration history. Also, members of his team climbed Mount Erebus, the most active Antarctic volcano. On returning home, Shackleton was knighted for his achievements by King Edward VII.

After the race to the South Pole ended in December 1911, with Roald Amundsen's conquest, Shackleton turned his attention to the crossing of Antarctica from sea to sea, via the pole. To this end, he made preparations for what became the Imperial Trans-Antarctic Expedition of 1914‍–‍1917. The expedition was struck by disaster when its ship, Endurance, became trapped in pack ice and finally sank in the Weddell Sea off Antarctica on 21 November 1915. The crew escaped by camping on the sea ice until it disintegrated, then by launching the lifeboats to reach Elephant Island and ultimately the South Atlantic island of South Georgia, enduring a stormy ocean voyage of 720 nautical miles (1,330 km; 830 mi) in Shackleton's most famous exploit. He returned to the Antarctic with the Shackleton–Rowett Expedition in 1921 but died of a heart attack while his ship was moored in South Georgia. At his wife's request, he remained on the island and was buried in Grytviken cemetery. The wreck of Endurance was discovered just over a century after Shackleton's death.

Away from his expeditions, Shackleton's life was generally restless and unfulfilled. In his search for rapid pathways to wealth and security, he launched business ventures that failed to prosper, and he died heavily in debt. He was lauded in the press upon his death but was thereafter largely forgotten, while the heroic reputation of his rival Scott was sustained for many decades. Later in the 20th century, Shackleton was "rediscovered", and he became a role model for leadership in extreme circumstances. In his 1956 address to the British Science Association, one of Shackleton's contemporaries, Sir Raymond Priestley, said: "Scott for scientific method, Amundsen for speed and efficiency[,] but[,] when disaster strikes and all hope is gone, get down on your knees and pray for Shackleton", paraphrasing what Apsley Cherry-Garrard had written in a preface to his 1922 memoir The Worst Journey in the World. In 2002, Shackleton was voted eleventh in a BBC poll of the 100 Greatest Britons.

== Early years ==
=== Childhood and education ===
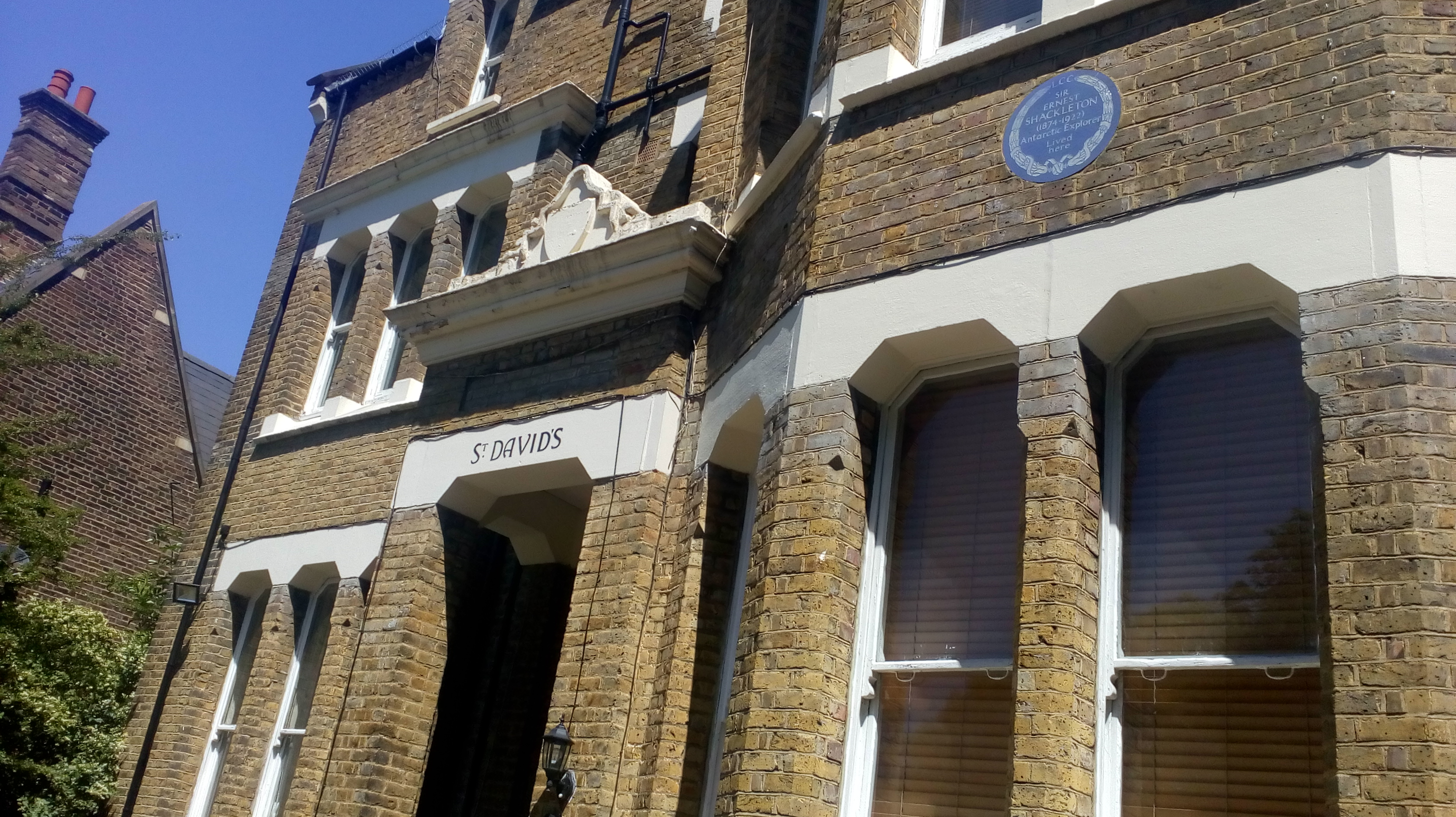
Blue plaque marking Shackleton's home at 12 Westwood Hill, Sydenham, London Borough of Lewisham

Ernest Henry Shackleton was born on 15 February 1874 in Kilkea, County Kildare, Ireland. His father, Henry Shackleton, tried to enter the British Army, but his poor health prevented him from doing so; instead he became a farmer and settled in Kilkea. The Shackleton family are of English origin, specifically from West Yorkshire. Shackleton's father was descended from Abraham Shackleton, an English Quaker who moved to Ireland in 1726 and started a school in Ballitore, County Kildare. Shackleton's mother, Henrietta Letitia Sophia Gavan, was descended from the Fitzmaurice family. Ernest was the second of ten children and the first of two sons; the second, Frank, achieved notoriety as a suspect, later exonerated, in the 1907 theft of the so-called Irish Crown Jewels, which have never been recovered.

In 1880, when Ernest was six, his father gave up his life as a landowner to study medicine at Trinity College Dublin, moving his family to the city. Four years later, they left Ireland and moved to Sydenham in suburban London. This was partly in search of better professional prospects for the newly qualified doctor, but another factor may have been unease about the family's Anglo-Irish ancestry, following the 1882 assassination by Irish nationalists of Lord Frederick Cavendish, the British Chief Secretary for Ireland. However, Shackleton took lifelong pride in his Irish roots and frequently declared that he was "an Irishman".

From early childhood, Shackleton was a voracious reader, a pursuit which sparked in him a passion for adventure. He was schooled by a governess until the age of eleven, when he began at Fir Lodge Preparatory School in West Hill, Dulwich, in southeast London. At the age of thirteen, he entered Dulwich College. As a youngster, Shackleton did not particularly distinguish himself as a scholar, and was said to be "bored" by his studies.

He was quoted later as saying: "I never learned much geography at school [...] Literature, too, consisted in the dissection, the parsing, the analysing of certain passages from our great poets and prose-writers ... teachers should be very careful not to spoil [their pupils'] taste for poetry for all time by making it a task and an imposition." In his final term at the school, he was still able to achieve fifth place in his class of thirty-one.

=== Merchant Navy officer ===
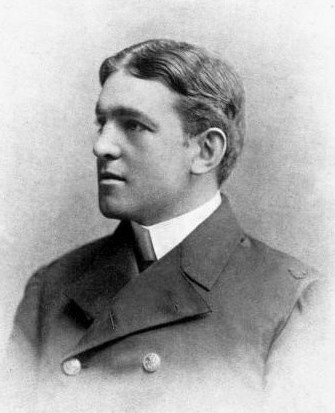
Shackleton in 1901, aged 27

Shackleton's restlessness at school was such that he was allowed to leave at sixteen and go to sea. One option was a Royal Navy officer cadetship in the Britannia at Dartmouth, but this was too expensive, and Shackleton passed the upper age limit of fourteen and a half in 1888. Alternatives were the mercantile marine cadet ships Worcester and Conway, or an apprenticeship "before the mast" on a sailing vessel. This third option was chosen. His father was able to secure him a berth with the North Western Shipping Company, aboard the square-rigged sailing ship Hoghton Tower.

Over the next four years at sea, Shackleton learned his trade and visited many parts of the world, forming a variety of acquaintances and learning to associate with people from many different walks of life. In August 1894, he passed his examination for second mate and accepted a post as third officer on a tramp steamer of the Welsh Shire Line. Two years later, he had obtained his first mate's ticket, and in 1898, he was certified as a master mariner, qualifying him to command a British ship anywhere in the world.

In 1900, he joined Union-Castle Line, the regular mail and passenger carrier between Britain and South Africa. One of his shipmates recorded that Shackleton was "a departure from our usual type of young officer", content with his own company though not aloof, "spouting lines from Keats or Browning", a mixture of sensitivity and aggression but not unsympathetic. Following the outbreak of the Boer War in 1899, Shackleton transferred to the troopship Tintagel Castle where, in March 1900, he met Cedric Longstaff, an army lieutenant whose father Llewellyn W. Longstaff was the main financial backer of the British National Antarctic Expedition then being organised in London.

Shackleton used his acquaintance with the son to obtain an interview with Longstaff senior, with a view to obtaining a place on the expedition. Impressed by Shackleton's keenness, Longstaff recommended him to Sir Clements Markham, the expedition's overlord, making it clear that he wanted Shackleton accepted. On 17 February 1901, his appointment as third officer to the expedition's ship Discovery was confirmed; on 4 June he was commissioned into the Royal Navy, with the rank of sub-lieutenant in the Royal Naval Reserve. Although officially on leave from Union-Castle, this was in fact the end of Shackleton's Merchant Navy service.

== Discovery Expedition, 1901–1903 ==
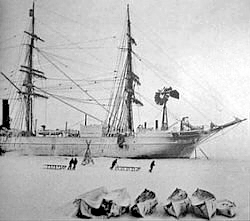
Discovery in Antarctic water

The British National Antarctic Expedition—known as the Discovery Expedition after the ship Discovery—was the brainchild of Sir Clements Markham, president of the Royal Geographical Society, and had been many years in preparation. Led by Robert Falcon Scott, a Royal Navy torpedo lieutenant lately promoted commander, the expedition had objectives that included scientific and geographical discovery.

Although Discovery was not a Royal Navy unit, Scott required the crew, officers and scientific staff to submit to the conditions of the Naval Discipline Act, meaning that the ship and expedition were run on Royal Navy lines. Shackleton accepted this approach, even though his own background and instincts favoured a different, more informal style of leadership. His particular duties were listed as: "In charge of sea-water analysis. Ward-room caterer. In charge of the holds, stores, and provisions [...] He also arranges the entertainments."

Discovery departed from London's East India Docks on 31 July 1901, arriving at the Antarctic coast, via Madeira, Cape Town and New Zealand, on 9 January 1902. After landing, Shackleton took part in an experimental balloon flight on 4 February. He also participated, with the scientists Edward A. Wilson and Hartley T. Ferrar, in the first sledging trip from the expedition's winter quarters in McMurdo Sound, a journey which established a safe route on to the Great Ice Barrier. Confined to the iced-in Discovery throughout the Antarctic winter of 1902, Shackleton edited the expedition's magazine the South Polar Times, a regular publication that kept everyone onboard entertained. According to steward Clarence Hare, Shackleton was "the most popular of the officers among the crew, being a good mixer", though claims that this represented an unofficial rivalry to Scott's leadership are unsupported.

Scott chose Shackleton to accompany Wilson and himself on the expedition's southern journey, a march southwards to achieve the highest possible latitude in the direction of the South Pole. This was not a serious attempt on the Pole, although the attainment of a high latitude was of great importance to Scott, and the inclusion of Shackleton indicated a high degree of personal trust. The party set out on 2 November 1902. Scott later wrote that the march was "a combination of success and failure". They reached a record Farthest South latitude of 82°17′ S, beating the previous record established in 1900 by Carsten Borchgrevink. (Note: Modern calculations, based on Shackleton's photograph and Wilson's drawing, place the furthest point reached at 82°11′ S. (Crane 2005, pp. 214–215))

The journey was marred by the poor performance of the dogs, who rapidly fell sick after their food had become tainted. All 22 dogs died during the march. The three men all suffered at times from snow blindness, frostbite and, ultimately, scurvy. On the return journey, Shackleton had by his own admission "broken down" and could no longer carry out his share of the work. He later denied Scott's claim in The Voyage of the Discovery, that he had been carried on the sledge. He was in a severely weakened condition; Wilson's diary entry for 14 January 1903 reads: "Shackleton has been anything but up to the mark, and today he is decidedly worse, very short-winded, and coughing constantly, with more serious symptoms which need not be detailed here, but which are of no small consequence a hundred and sixty miles from the ship, and full loads to pull all the way."

The party finally arrived back at the ship on 3 February 1903. After a medical examination that proved inconclusive, Scott decided to send Shackleton home on the relief ship Morning, which had arrived in McMurdo Sound in January. Scott wrote: "He ought not to risk further hardships in his present state of health." There is conjecture that Scott's motive for removing him was resentment of Shackleton's popularity, and that ill-health was used as an excuse to get rid of him.

Years after the deaths of Scott, Wilson and Shackleton, the expedition's second-in-command Albert Armitage claimed that there had been a falling-out on the southern journey, and that Scott had told the ship's doctor that "[if] he does not go back sick he will go back in disgrace". There is no corroboration of Armitage's story. Shackleton and Scott remained on friendly terms, at least until the publication of Scott's account of the southern journey in The Voyage of the Discovery. While in public they appeared mutually respectful and cordial, according to biographer Roland Huntford, Shackleton's attitude to Scott turned to "smouldering scorn and dislike"; salvage of wounded pride required "a return to the Antarctic and an attempt to outdo Scott".

== Shore work, 1903–1907 ==
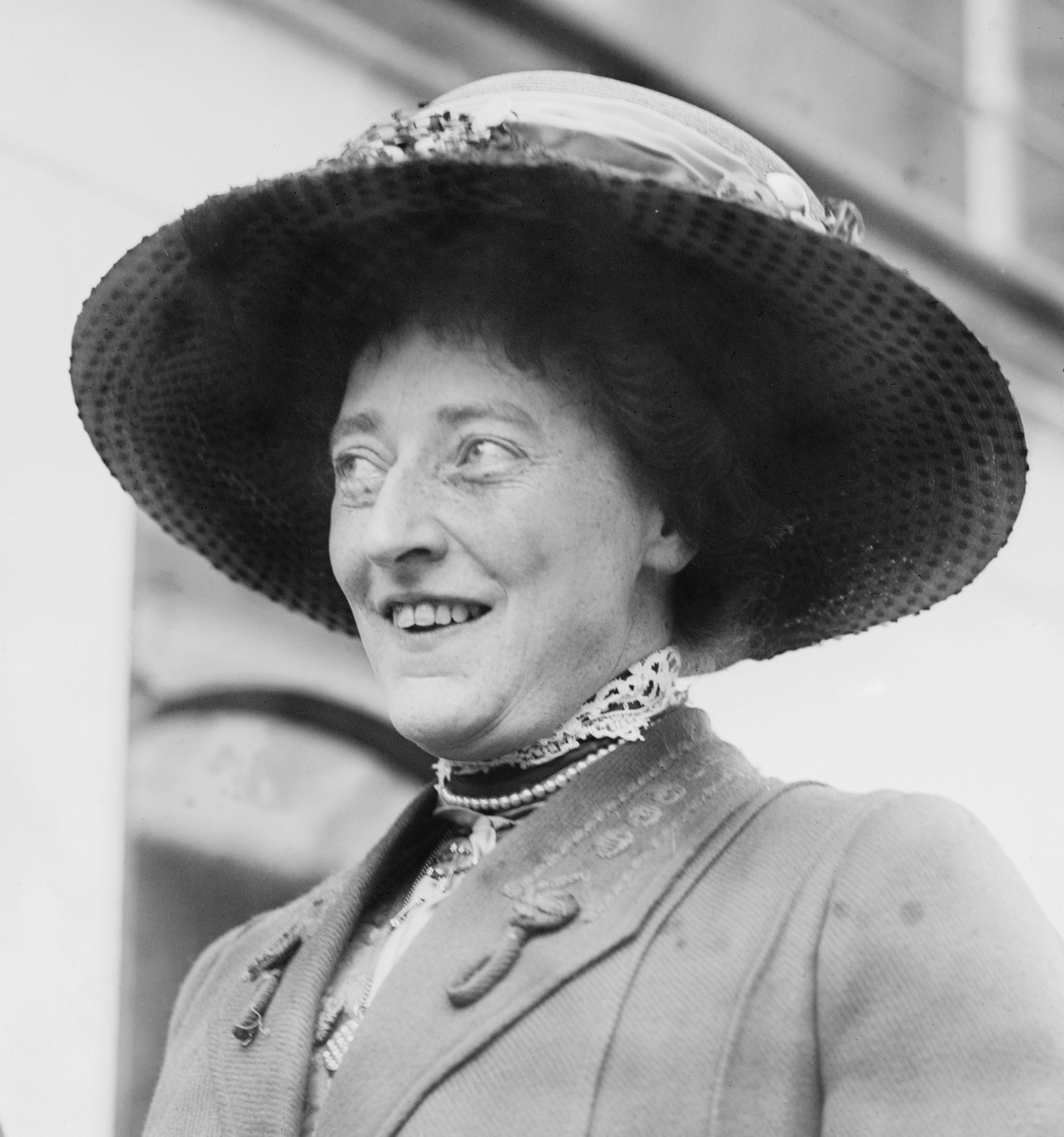
Shackleton's wife Emily Dorman

After a period of convalescence in New Zealand, Shackleton returned to England via San Francisco and New York City. As the first significant person to return from the Antarctic, he found that he was in demand; in particular, the Admiralty wished to consult him about its further proposals for the rescue of Discovery. With Sir Clements Markham's blessing, he accepted a temporary post assisting the outfitting of the Terra Nova for the second Discovery relief operation, but turned down the offer to sail with her as chief officer. He also assisted in the equipping of the Argentine Uruguay, which was being fitted out for the relief of the stranded Swedish Antarctic Expedition under Otto Nordenskjöld.

In search of more permanent employment in 1903, Shackleton applied for a regular commission in the Royal Navy via the back-door route of the Supplementary List. Despite the sponsorship of Markham and William Huggins, the president of the Royal Society, his application was unsuccessful because the list was closed. The Admiralty suggested that he could be promoted to Lieutenant in the Royal Naval Reserve if he qualified, but he chose to resign his RNR commission the following year. Instead, he became a journalist, working for the Royal Magazine, but he found this unsatisfactory. He was then offered, and accepted, the secretaryship of the Royal Scottish Geographical Society (RSGS), a post which he took up on 11 January 1904. Three months later, on 9 April, he married Emily Dorman, with whom he had three children: Raymond, Cecily, and Edward, himself an explorer and later a politician.

In 1905, Shackleton became a shareholder in a speculative company that aimed to make a fortune transporting Russian troops home from the Far East. Despite his assurances to Emily that "we are practically sure of the contract", nothing came of this scheme. He also ventured into politics, unsuccessfully standing in the 1906 general election as the Liberal Unionist Party's candidate for Dundee constituency in opposition to Irish Home Rule. (Note: Shackleton stood as political candidate in Dundee but finished fourth of five candidates, with 3,865 votes to the victor's 9,276. (Morrell & Capparell 2001, p. 32)) In the meantime, he had taken a job with wealthy Clydeside industrialist William Beardmore (later Lord Invernairn), with a roving commission, which involved interviewing prospective clients and entertaining Beardmore's business friends. He was, by this time, making no secret of his ambition to return to Antarctica at the head of his own expedition.

Beardmore was sufficiently impressed with Shackleton to offer financial support, (Note: Beardmore's help took the form of guaranteeing a loan at Clydesdale Bank, for £7,000 (equivalent to £735,891 in 2025), not through an outright gift. (Riffenburgh 2004, p. 106)) but other donations proved hard to come by. Nevertheless, in February 1907, Shackleton presented to the Royal Geographical Society his plans for an Antarctic expedition, the details of which, under the name British Antarctic Expedition, were published in the RGS newsletter, Geographical Journal. The aim was the conquest of both the geographical South Pole and the South Magnetic Pole. He then worked hard to persuade others of his wealthy friends and acquaintances to contribute, including Sir Philip Lee Brocklehurst, who subscribed £2,000 (equivalent to £208,018 in 2025) to secure a place on the expedition; author Campbell Mackellar; and Guinness baron Lord Iveagh, whose contribution was secured less than two weeks before the departure of the expedition ship Nimrod.

On 4 August 1907, Shackleton was appointed a Member of the Royal Victorian Order, 4th Class (MVO; the present-day grade of lieutenant).

== Nimrod Expedition, 1907–1909 ==
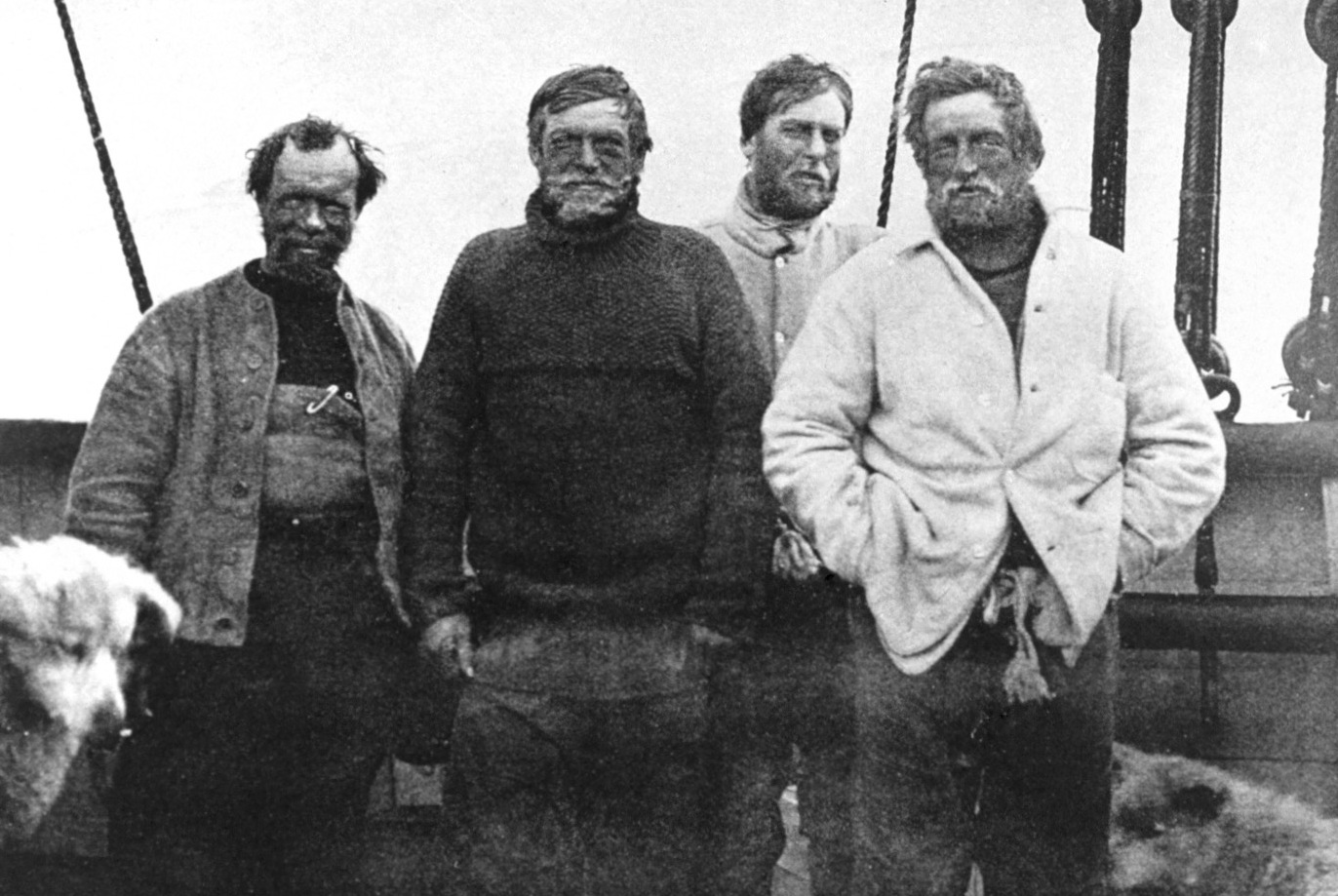
South Pole party: Frank Wild, Shackleton, Eric Marshall, Jameson Adams

On 7 August 1907, the Nimrod set sail from England for the start of the British Antarctic Expedition, reaching New Zealand at the end of November. After some final preparations, the expedition set off from Lyttelton Harbour on 1 January 1908, heading for the Antarctic. Shackleton had originally planned to use the old Discovery base in McMurdo Sound to launch his attempts on the South Pole and South Magnetic Pole, but before leaving England, he had been pressured into giving Scott an undertaking not to base himself in the McMurdo area, which Scott was claiming as his own field of work. Shackleton reluctantly agreed to seek out winter quarters at either the Barrier Inlet—which he had briefly visited in 1902 on Discovery—or King Edward VII Land.

To conserve coal, the ship was towed 1,650 miles (2,655 km) by the steamer Koonya to the Antarctic ice, after Shackleton had persuaded the New Zealand government and the Union Steamship Company to share the cost. In accordance with Shackleton's promise to Scott, the ship headed for the eastern sector of the Great Ice Barrier, arriving there on 21 January 1908. They discovered that the Barrier Inlet had expanded to form a large bay, containing hundreds of whales, and they immediately christened it the "Bay of Whales".

The ice conditions were found to be unstable, making it impossible to establish a safe base at the Barrier Inlet, and an extended search for an anchorage at King Edward VII Land proved equally futile. Shackleton was forced to break the undertaking he had made to Scott, and the Nimrod set sail for McMurdo Sound; according to second officer Arthur Harbord, this decision was "dictated by common sense" in view of the difficulties of ice pressure, coal shortage and the lack of any alternative base known to be close at hand. The ship arrived at McMurdo Sound on 29 January, but was stopped by ice 16 miles (26 km) north of Discovery's old base at Hut Point. After considerable weather delays, a base was eventually established at Cape Royds, about 24 miles (39 km) north of Hut Point. The party was in high spirits, despite the difficult conditions; Shackleton's ability to bond with his crew kept the party happy and focused.

On 29 October 1908, Shackleton and three companions—Frank Wild, Eric Marshall and Jameson Adams—set off on the "Great Southern Journey", as Wild called it. On 9 January 1909, they reached a new Farthest South latitude of 88°23′ S, a point 112 miles (180 km) from the Pole. (Note: The distance from the Pole is commonly given as 97 or 98 miles, this being the distance in nautical miles. (Shackleton, The Heart of the Antarctic, p. 210)) En route, the South Pole party discovered the Beardmore Glacier, named after Shackleton's patron, and the four men became the first persons to see and travel on the South Polar Plateau. Their return journey to McMurdo Sound was a race to avoid starvation, and they were restricted to half-rations for much of the duration. At one point, Shackleton gave his one biscuit allotted for the day to the ailing Frank Wild, who wrote in his diary: "All the money that was ever minted would not have bought that biscuit and the remembrance of that sacrifice will never leave me". The party arrived back at Hut Point just in time to catch the ship.

The other main accomplishments of the British Antarctic Expedition included the first ascent of Mount Erebus, and the discovery of the approximate location of the South Magnetic Pole, attained by Edgeworth David, Douglas Mawson and Alistair Mackay on 16 January 1909. Shackleton returned to the United Kingdom as a hero, and soon afterwards published his account of the expedition, The Heart of the Antarctic. His wife Emily later recorded: "The only comment he made to me about not reaching the Pole, was 'a live donkey is better than a dead lion, isn't it?' and I said 'Yes darling, as far as I am concerned,' and we left it at that."

Cylinder recording talking about the voyage as described, 1910

In 1910, Shackleton made a series of three recordings using an Edison phonograph, in which he briefly described the expedition. In 2010, several (mostly intact) cases of whisky and brandy that had been left behind in 1909 were recovered for analysis by a distilling company. A revival of the vintage formula for the particular brands found was offered for sale, with a portion of the proceeds donated to the New Zealand Antarctic Heritage Trust which had discovered the lost spirits.

== Between expeditions, 1909–1914 ==
=== Public hero ===
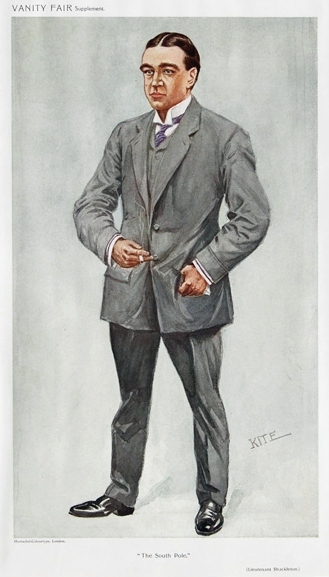
Caricature of Shackleton in Vanity Fair, 6 October 1909, captioned "The South Pole"

On Shackleton's return home, public honours were quickly forthcoming. He was received by King Edward VII on 10 July 1909, and raised to a Commander of the Royal Victorian Order. He received a knighthood in the King's Birthday Honours list in November, becoming Sir Ernest Shackleton. The RGS awarded him a gold medal; a proposal to present him with a smaller medal than that earlier awarded to Captain Scott was not acted on. Each member of the Nimrod Expedition shore party received a silver Polar Medal on 23 November, Shackleton himself receiving a clasp to attach to his earlier medal. He was also appointed a Younger Brother of Trinity House, a significant honour for British mariners.

Besides the official honours bestowed on Shackleton, his Antarctic feats were greeted in Britain with great enthusiasm. Proposing a toast to Shackleton at a lunch given in his honour by the Royal Societies Club, Lord Halsbury, a former Lord Chancellor, said: "When one remembers what he had gone through, one does not believe in the supposed degeneration of the British race. One does not believe that we have lost all sense of admiration for courage [and] endurance". The heroism was also claimed by Ireland: the Dublin Evening Telegraph's headline read "South Pole Almost Reached by an Irishman", while the Dublin Express spoke of the "qualities which were his heritage as an Irishman".

Shackleton's fellow polar explorers expressed their admiration; Roald Amundsen wrote, in a letter to RGS Secretary John Scott Keltie, that "the English nation has by this deed of Shackleton's won a victory [...] which never can be surpassed." Fridtjof Nansen sent an effusive private letter to Shackleton's wife, praising the "unique expedition, which has been such a complete success in every respect." The reality was that the expedition had left Shackleton deeply in debt, unable to meet the financial guarantees he had given to backers. Despite his efforts, it required government action, in the form of a grant of £20,000 (equivalent to £2,036,840 in 2025) to clear the most pressing obligations, and it is likely that many of his debts were written off.

=== Biding time ===
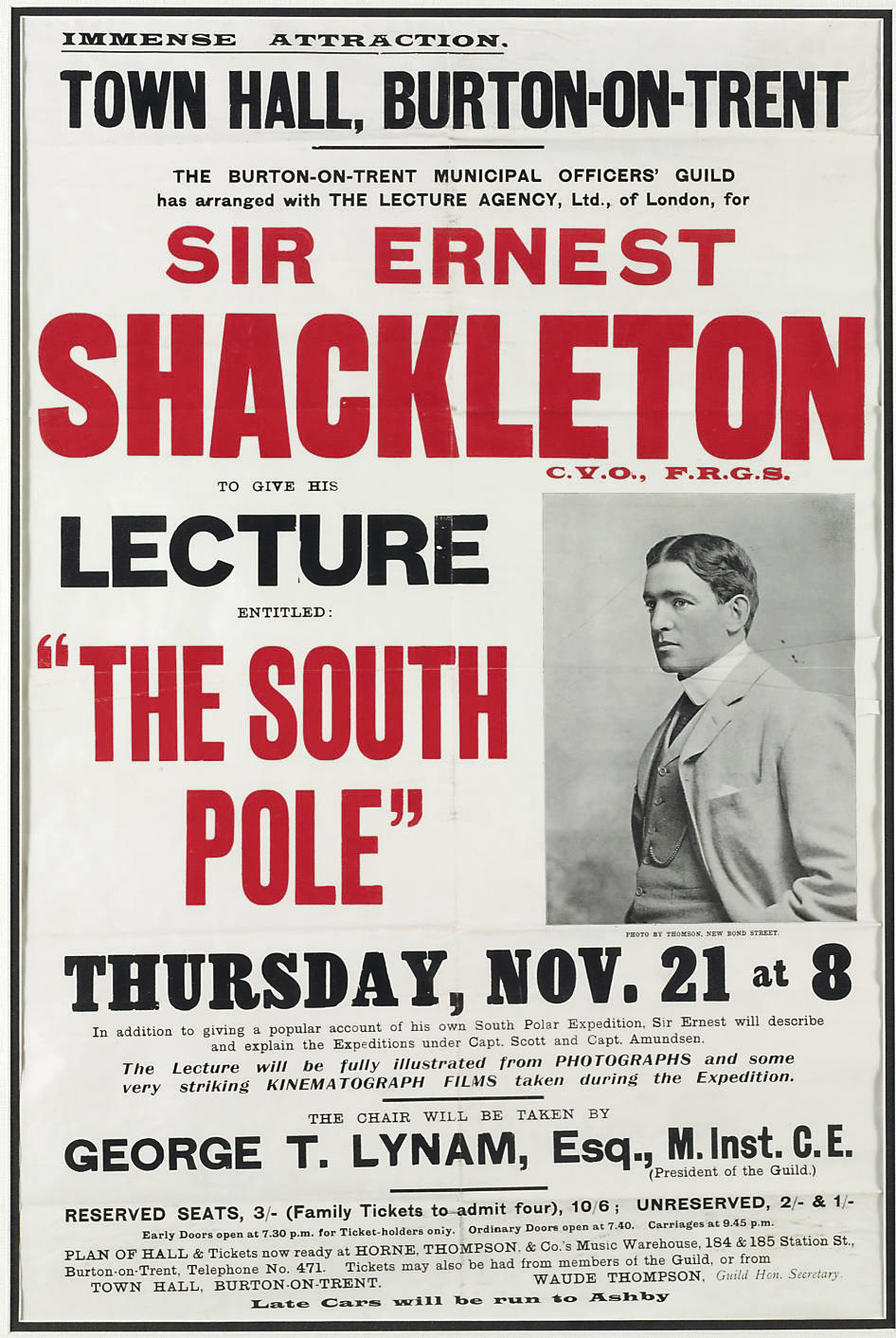
Shackleton embarked on an extensive lecture tour in which he talked not only about his own polar journeys but also those of Scott and Roald Amundsen.

In the period immediately after his return, Shackleton engaged in a strenuous schedule of public appearances, lectures and social engagements. He then sought to cash in on his celebrity by making a fortune in the world of business. Among the ventures that he hoped to promote were a tobacco company, a scheme for selling special postage stamps to collectors—overprinted "King Edward VII Land", based on his appointment as Antarctic postmaster by the New Zealand authorities—and the development of a Hungarian mining concession he had acquired near the city of Nagybanya, now part of Romania.

As none of these enterprises prospered, Shackleton's main source of income was his earnings from lecture tours. He still harboured thoughts of returning south, even though in September 1910, having recently moved with his family to Sheringham in Norfolk, he wrote to Emily: "I am never again going South and I have thought it all out and my place is at home now." He had been in discussions with Douglas Mawson about a scientific expedition to the Antarctic coast between Cape Adare and Gaussberg, and had written to the RGS about this in February 1910. (Note: This expedition took place under Mawson, without Shackleton's participation, as the Australasian Antarctic Expedition of 1911‍–‍1913. (Riffenburgh 2004, p. 298))

Any future resumption by Shackleton of his quest for the South Pole depended on the results of Scott's Terra Nova Expedition, which had sailed from Cardiff on 15 June 1910. By early 1912, the world was aware that the pole had been conquered by the Norwegian Roald Amundsen, but the fate of Scott's expedition was not then known. Shackleton's mind turned to a project that had been announced, and then abandoned, by the British explorer William Speirs Bruce, for a continental crossing via the South Pole, starting from a landing point in the Weddell Sea and ending in McMurdo Sound. Bruce had failed to acquire financial backing, and was happy for Shackleton to adopt his plans, which were similar to those being followed by the German explorer Wilhelm Filchner who had left Bremerhaven in May 1911; in December 1912, the news arrived from South Georgia that Filchner's expedition had failed. (Note: Filchner was able to bring back geographical information that would be of much use to Shackleton, including the discovery of a possible landing site at Vahsel Bay. (Huntford 1985, p. 367)) In Shackleton's own words, the transcontinental journey was the "one great main object of Antarctic journeyings" remaining, and now open to him.

=== Titanic inquiry ===
In 1912, Shackleton provided testimony to the British Board of Trade inquiry into the sinking of Titanic. Drawing on his experience as an Antarctic explorer and maritime officer, he appeared as a witness during the proceedings, which examined ship operations, safety practices, and prevailing professional standards at sea. His participation reflects the extent to which Shackleton was regarded at the time as an authoritative figure on maritime risk and operations beyond the field of polar exploration.

== Imperial Trans-Antarctic Expedition, 1914–1917 ==
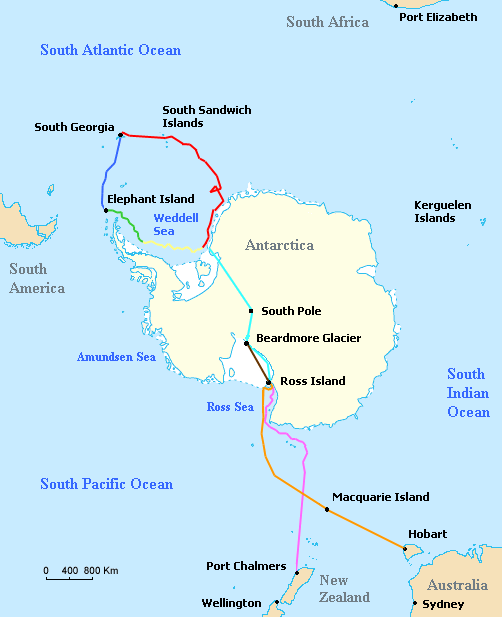
Map showing the routes of the ships, support team and planned continental crossing of the Imperial Trans-Antarctic Expedition Voyage of the Endurance Drift of the Endurance in pack ice Sea ice drift after the Endurance sinks Voyage of the James Caird Planned trans-Antarctic route Voyage of the Aurora to Antarctica Retreat of the Aurora Supply depot route

=== Preparations ===
In December 1913, Shackleton published details of his new expedition, grandly titled the "Imperial Trans-Antarctic Expedition". There is a legend that Shackleton posted an advertisement emphasising the hardship and danger of the planned voyage, so that he could better narrow down the selection of candidates for his expedition, but no record of any such advertisement has survived and its existence is considered doubtful. Two ships were to be employed: Endurance would carry the main party into the Weddell Sea, aiming for Vahsel Bay from where a team of six, led by Shackleton, would begin the crossing of the continent; meanwhile, a second ship, the Aurora, would take a supporting party under Captain Aeneas Mackintosh to McMurdo Sound on the far side of the continent. This party would be tasked with laying supply depots across the Great Ice Barrier as far as the Beardmore Glacier, the depots holding the food and fuel required to enable Shackleton's party to complete their journey of 1,800 miles (2,900 km) across the continent.

Shackleton used his considerable fund-raising skills to support the expedition, which was financed largely by private donations, although the British government gave £10,000 (equivalent to £997,636 in 2025). Scottish jute magnate Sir James Caird donated £24,000, Midlands industrialist Frank Dudley Docker gave £10,000, and tobacco heiress Janet Stancomb-Wills gave an undisclosed but reportedly "generous" sum. There was considerable public interest; Shackleton received more than 5,000 applications to join his expedition.

At times, his interviewing and selection methods seemed eccentric; believing that character and temperament were as important as technical ability, his questions were unconventional. Physicist Reginald James was asked if he could sing; others were accepted on sight because Shackleton liked the look of them, or after the briefest of interrogations. He loosened some of the traditional hierarchies to promote camaraderie, such as distributing the ship's chores equally among officers, scientists and able seamen. He made a point of socialising with his crew members every evening after dinner, leading sing-alongs, jokes and games. He finally selected a crew of fifty-six; shared equally, twenty-eight men on each ship.

Despite the outbreak of the First World War on 3 August 1914, Endurance was directed by the First Lord of the Admiralty, Winston Churchill, to "proceed", (Note: Churchill sent Shackleton a one-word telegram on 3 August – Proceed. (Fisher & Fisher 1957, p. 324)) and left British waters on 8 August. Shackleton delayed his own departure until 27 September, meeting the ship in Buenos Aires. On setting sail for South Georgia at the end of October, he sent a cablegram to the Daily Chronicle, conveying the patriotic message: "We hope in our small way to add victories in science and discovery to that certain victory which our nation will achieve in the cause of honour and liberty."

=== Crew ===
Shackleton led the expedition, Captain Frank Worsley commanded the Endurance and Captain Aeneas Mackintosh the Aurora. On the Endurance, the second-in-command was the experienced explorer Frank Wild, and the first officer was Lionel Greenstreet. The meteorologist was Leonard Hussey, who was also an able banjo player. Surgeon James McIlroy was head of the scientific staff, which included geologist James Wordie. Alexander Macklin was the second of the two surgeons, also in charge of keeping the 70 dogs healthy. Tom Crean was in more immediate charge as head dog-handler. Other crew included navigator Hubert Hudson, physicist Reginald James, a carpenter Harry McNish, and a biologist named Robert Clark.

Of later independent fame was the expedition's official photographer Frank Hurley, known on this mission for his perilous shots. Perce Blackborow was a nineteen-year-old Welsh sailor who had stowed away on the ship after being refused a job; although angered by this, Shackleton realised it was too late to turn back by the time the situation was discovered, so Blackborow was allowed to join the crew and assigned to the ship's galley.

There was a (male) cat on board, named Mrs Chippy, that belonged to the carpenter Harry McNish. Mrs Chippy was shot when the Endurance sank, due to the belief that he would not have survived the ordeal that followed.

=== Loss of Endurance ===
Endurance departed from South Georgia for the Weddell Sea on 5 December 1914, heading for Vahsel Bay. As the ship moved southward navigating in ice, she encountered first-year ice, which slowed progress. Deep in the Weddell Sea, conditions gradually grew worse until, on 19 January 1915, Endurance became frozen fast in an ice floe.

On 24 February, realising that they would be trapped until the following spring, Shackleton ordered the abandonment of the ship's routine and her conversion to a winter station. Endurance drifted slowly northward with the ice through the following months. When spring arrived in September, the breaking of the ice and its later movements put extreme pressure on the ship's hull.

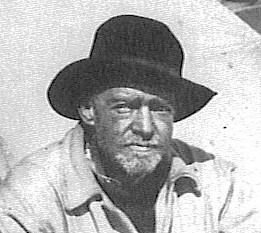
Shackleton after the loss of Endurance

Shackleton had been hoping that the ship, when released from the ice, could work her way back towards Vahsel Bay, but his hopes were dashed on 24 October when water began pouring in. After a few days, with the position at 69°5′ S, 51°30′ W, he gave the order to abandon ship, saying, "She's going down!"; and men, provisions and equipment were transferred to camps on the ice. On 21 November 1915, the wreck of Endurance finally slipped beneath the surface. (Note: Endurance was located on 5 March 2022 by the Endurance22 expedition of researchers and technicians, 4 miles (6.4 km) from where it was lost and 9,869 feet (3,008 m) below the surface.)

For almost two months, Shackleton and his party camped on a large, flat floe, hoping that it would drift towards Paulet Island, approximately 250 miles (402 km) away, where it was known that stores were cached. After failed attempts to march across the ice to this island, Shackleton decided to set up another more permanent camp (Patience Camp) on another floe, and trust to the drift of the ice to take them towards a safe landing. By 17 March, their ice camp was within 60 miles (97 km) of Paulet Island; however, separated by impassable ice, they were unable to reach it. On 9 April, their ice floe broke into two, and Shackleton ordered the crew into the lifeboats and to head for the nearest land.

After five harrowing days at sea, the exhausted men landed their three lifeboats at Elephant Island, 346 miles (557 km) from where the Endurance had sunk. This was the first time they had set foot on solid ground for 497 days. Shackleton's concern for his men was such that he gave his mittens to photographer Frank Hurley, who had lost his own mittens during the boat journey. Shackleton suffered frostbitten fingers as a result.

=== Open-boat journey ===
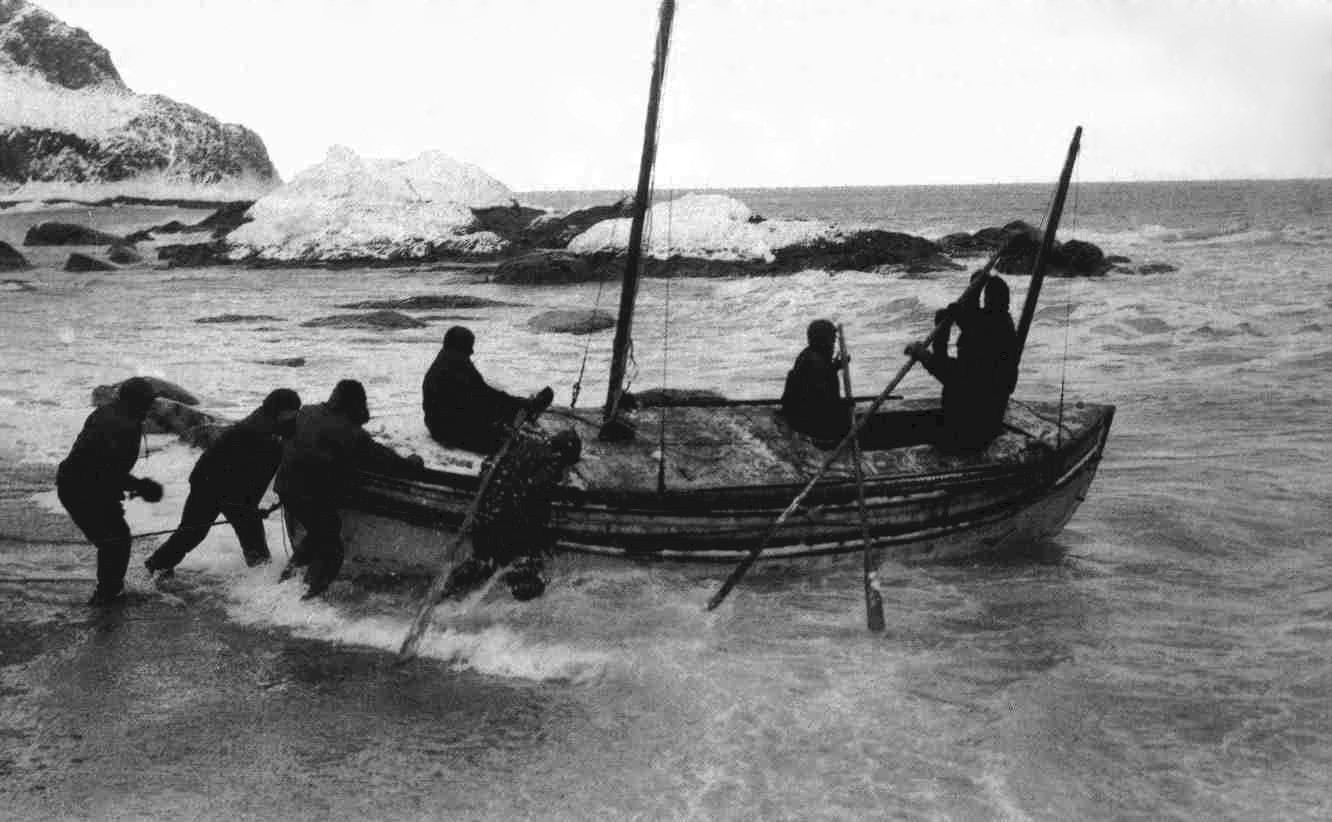
Launching the James Caird from the shore of Elephant Island, 24 April 1916

Elephant Island was an inhospitable place, far from any shipping routes. Rescue by means of a chance discovery was very unlikely, so Shackleton decided to risk an open-boat journey to the South Georgia whaling stations where he knew help would be available. The strongest of the tiny 20-foot (6.1 m) lifeboats, christened James Caird after the expedition's chief sponsor, was chosen for the trip. Ship's carpenter Harry McNish made various improvements, which included raising the sides, strengthening the keel, building a makeshift deck of wood and canvas, and sealing the work with oil paint and seal blood.

Shackleton chose five companions for the journey: the ship's captain Frank Worsley, who would be responsible for navigation; Tom Crean, who had "begged to go"; two strong sailors in John Vincent and Timothy McCarthy; and McNish. The carpenter had earlier clashed with Shackleton when the party was stranded on the ice but, while not forgetting his earlier insubordination, Shackleton recognised McNish's value for this particular job. (Note: For an account of McNish's "mutiny", see Huntford 1985, pp. 475–476. Despite McNish's heroics during the James Caird voyage, Shackleton refused to recommend him for the award of a Polar Medal. (Huntford 1985, p. 656))

Shackleton insisted on packing only enough supplies to last for four weeks, knowing that if they failed to reach South Georgia within that time, the boat and its crew would be lost. The James Caird was launched on 24 April 1916; during the next fifteen days, it sailed through the waters of the southern ocean, at the mercy of the stormy seas and in peril of capsizing. Thanks to Worsley's navigational skills, the cliffs of South Georgia came into sight on 8 May, but hurricane-force winds prevented any possibility of landing. The party was forced to ride out the storm offshore, in continual danger of being dashed against the rocks. They later learned that the same storm had sunk a 500-ton steamer bound for South Georgia from Buenos Aires.

The next day, they were able to land on the unoccupied southern shore, and a period of rest and recuperation followed. Rather than risking another sea journey to reach the whaling stations on the northern coast, Shackleton decided to attempt a land crossing of the island. Although it is likely that Norwegian whalers had already crossed the island at other points on ski, no one had previously attempted this particular route. For their journey, the men were only equipped with boots they had adapted for climbing by pushing screws into the soles, a carpenter's adze, and 50 feet (15 m) of rope. Leaving McNish, Vincent and McCarthy at the landing point on South Georgia, Shackleton travelled with Worsley and Crean over 32 miles (51 km) of dangerous mountainous terrain for 36 hours, reaching the whaling station at Stromness on 20 May.

=== Rescue ===
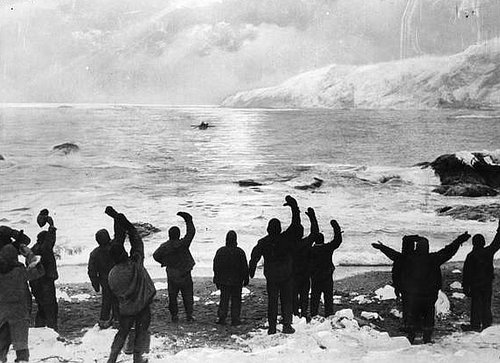
"All Safe, All Well", allegedly depicting Shackleton's return to Elephant Island in August 1916. To create this image, a photograph of the departure of the James Caird in April 1916 was doctored by photographer Frank Hurley.

Shackleton immediately sent a boat to pick up the three men from the other side of South Georgia Island, while he set to work organising the rescue of those left behind on Elephant Island. His first three attempts were foiled by sea ice, which blocked the approaches to the island. He appealed to the Chilean government and was offered the use of the Yelcho, a small seagoing tug from the Chilean Navy. Yelcho, commanded by Captain Luis Pardo, and the British whaler Southern Sky, reached Elephant Island on 30 August 1916, at which point the men had been isolated there for four and a half months. Shackleton quickly evacuated all 22 men. The party was taken on Yelcho first to Punta Arenas and after some days to Valparaíso in Chile, where crowds warmly welcomed them back to civilisation.

At the same time that the Endurance was suffering these perils, the Aurora (the expedition supporting component) also suffered misfortune. The remaining men of the Ross Sea party had been stranded at Cape Evans in McMurdo Sound when the Aurora was blown from its anchorage and driven out to sea, unable to return. After a drift of many months, the ship returned to New Zealand. Shackleton travelled there to join Aurora, and sailed with her to rescue the Ross Sea party. Said party had successfully completed its depot-laying mission, despite many hardships, during which three lives had been lost, including party commander Aeneas Mackintosh.

== First World War ==
Europe was in the midst of the First World War when Shackleton returned to England in May 1917. Suffering from a heart condition, made worse by the fatigue of his arduous journeys, and too old to be conscripted, he nevertheless volunteered for the British Army. He repeatedly requested posting to the front in France, and was by now drinking heavily.

In October 1917, Shackleton was sent to Buenos Aires to boost British propaganda in South America. Unqualified as a diplomat, he was unsuccessful in persuading Argentina and Chile to enter the war on the Allied side, and he returned home in April 1918. He was then briefly involved in a mission to Spitzbergen, to establish a British presence there under the guise of a mining operation. On the way, he was taken ill in Tromsø, possibly with a heart attack. He was then appointed to a military expedition to Murmansk, which obliged him to return home again before departing for northern Russia.

== Russian Civil War ==
Shackleton was specially appointed a temporary major on 22 July 1918. From October 1918, he served with the North Russia Expeditionary Force in the Russian Civil War under the command of Major-General Edmund Ironside, with the role of advising on the equipment and training of British forces in arctic conditions.

For his "valuable services rendered in connection with Military Operations in North Russia", Shackleton was appointed an Officer of the Order of the British Empire in the 1919 King's Birthday Honours, and he was also mentioned in despatches by General Ironside. Returning to England in early March 1919, he was full of plans for the economic development of Northern Russia. In the midst of seeking capital, his plans foundered when Northern Russia fell to Bolshevik control. Shackleton was finally discharged from the army in October 1919, retaining his rank of major.

== Final expedition and death ==
Film fragment from 1922: Sir Ernest Shackleton

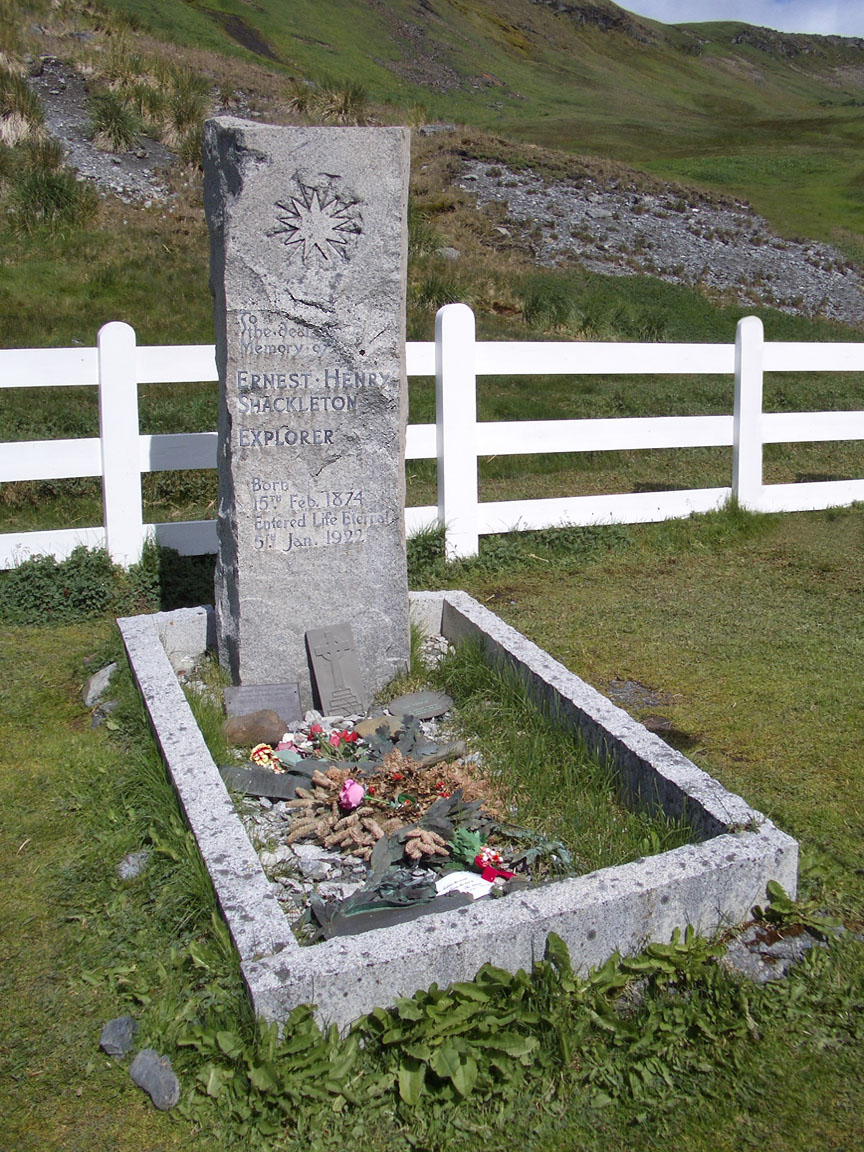
Shackleton's grave at Grytviken

Shackleton returned to the lecture circuit and in December 1919 he published his own account of the Imperial Trans-Antarctic Expedition, titled South. In 1920, tired of public speaking, he began to consider the possibility of a last expedition. He thought seriously of going to the Beaufort Sea area of the Arctic, a largely unexplored region, and raised some interest in this idea from the Canadian government. With funds supplied by former schoolfriend John Quiller Rowett, Shackleton acquired a 125-ton Norwegian sealer, named Foca I, which he renamed Quest.

The plan changed; the destination became the Antarctic, and the project was defined by Shackleton as an "oceanographic and sub-antarctic-expedition". The goals of the venture were imprecise, but a circumnavigation of the Antarctic continent and investigation of some "lost" sub-Antarctic islands, such as Tuanaki, were mentioned as objectives. Rowett agreed to finance the entire expedition, which became known as the Shackleton–Rowett Expedition.

On 16 September 1921, Shackleton recorded a farewell address on a sound-on-film system created by Harry Grindell Matthews, who claimed it was the first "talking picture" ever made. The expedition left England on 24 September 1921. Although some of Shackleton's former crew members had not received all of their pay from the Endurance expedition, many of them signed on with their erstwhile "Boss".

When the party arrived in Rio de Janeiro, Shackleton suffered a suspected heart attack. He refused to have a proper medical examination, and Quest continued south, arriving at South Georgia on 4 January 1922. In the early hours of the next morning, Shackleton summoned the expedition's physician, Alexander Macklin, to his cabin complaining of back pains and other discomfort. According to Macklin's own account, he told Shackleton that he had been overdoing things and should try to "lead a more regular life", to which Shackleton answered: "You are always wanting me to give up things, what is it I ought to give up?" Macklin replied: "Chiefly alcohol, Boss." A few moments later, at 2:50 a.m. on 5 January 1922, Shackleton suffered a fatal heart attack.

After carrying out the post-mortem, Macklin concluded that the cause of death was atheroma of the coronary arteries exacerbated by "overstrain during a period of debility". Contemporary study of diaries kept by Eric Marshall, medical officer to the 1907–1909 expedition, suggests that Shackleton suffered from an atrial septal defect ("hole in the heart"), a congenital heart defect, which may have been a cause of his health problems.

Shackleton's funeral procession in Montevideo, Uruguay

Leonard Hussey, a veteran of the Imperial Trans-Antarctic Expedition, offered to accompany Shackleton's body back to Britain, but while he was in Montevideo en route to England, a message was received from Emily Shackleton asking that her husband be buried in South Georgia. Hussey returned to South Georgia with the body on the steamer Woodville, and on 5 March 1922, Shackleton was buried in the Grytviken cemetery, after a short service in the Lutheran church, with Edward Binnie officiating. Macklin wrote in his diary: "I think this is as the boss would have had it himself, standing lonely on an island far from civilization, surrounded by a stormy tempestuous sea, and in the vicinity of one of his greatest exploits."

Shackleton's will was proven in London on 12 May 1922. He died heavily in debt, his small estate consisting of personal effects to the value of £556 (equivalent to £27,316 in 2025). Lady Shackleton died in 1936, having survived her husband by fourteen years.

On 27 November 2011, the ashes of Frank Wild were interred on the right-hand side of Shackleton's gravesite in Grytviken. The inscription on the rough-hewn granite block set to mark the spot reads: "Frank Wild 1873‍–‍1939, Shackleton's right-hand man."

In June 2024, wreck hunters found Quest, the vessel on which Shackleton made his final voyage. She was found on the seafloor off the coast of Newfoundland, Canada by a team led by the Royal Canadian Geographical Society (RCGS). The ship was found "intact" lying at a depth of 390 metres (1,280 ft).

== Legacy ==
=== Early ===
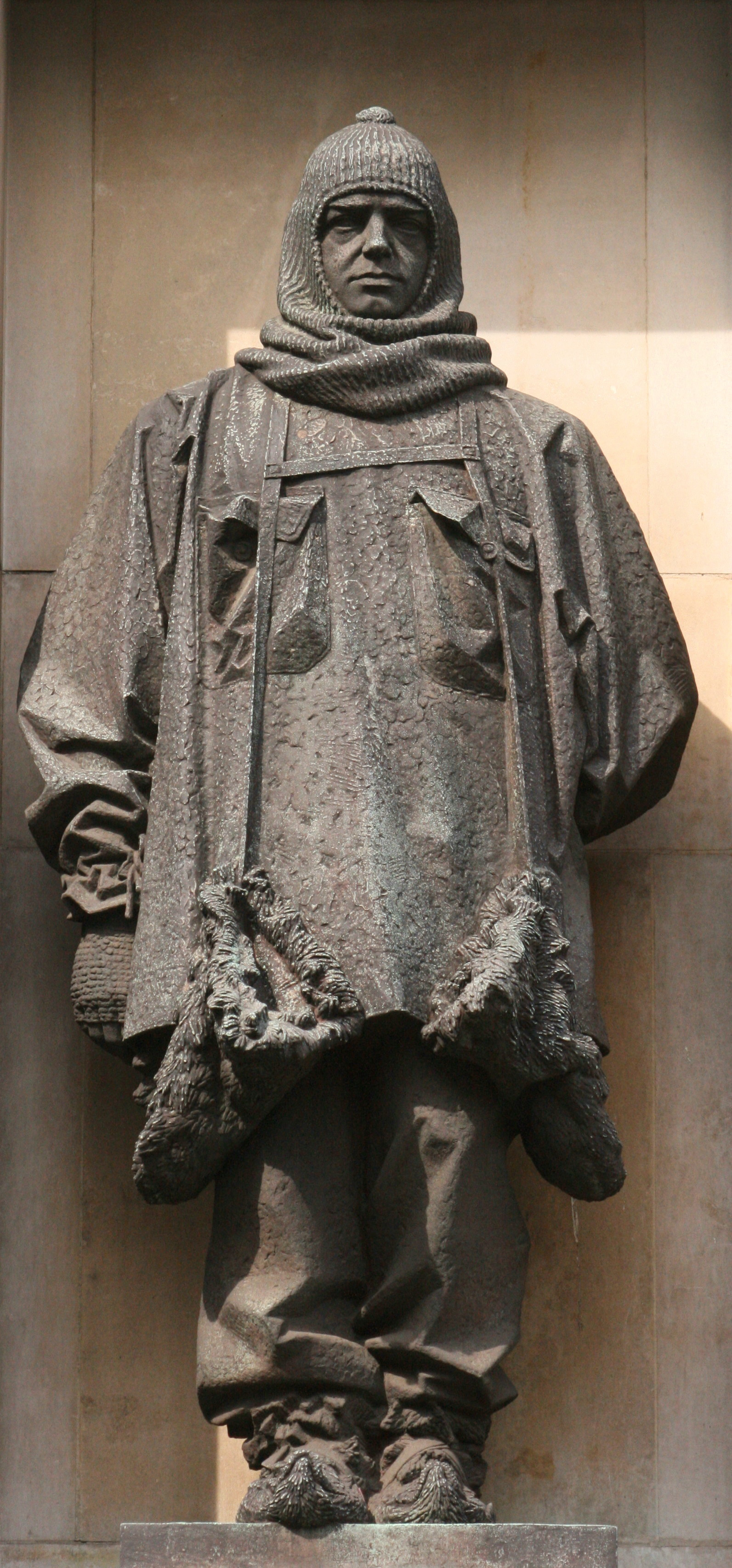
Shackleton statue by C. S. Jagger outside the Royal Geographical Society

Before the return of Shackleton's body to South Georgia, a memorial service with full military honours took place at Holy Trinity Church, Montevideo, and a service was held on 2 March 1922 at St Paul's Cathedral, London, at which King George V and other members of the royal family were represented. Within a year, the first biography was published: The Life of Sir Ernest Shackleton by Hugh Robert Mill. As well as being a tribute to the explorer, this book was a practical effort to assist his family; Shackleton had died some £40,000 in debt (equivalent to £1,965,192 in 2025). A further initiative was the formation of a Shackleton Memorial Fund, which was used to assist with his children's education and to support his mother.

Shackleton's death marked the end of the Heroic Age of Antarctic Exploration, a period of discovery characterised by journeys of geographical and scientific exploration in a largely unknown continent without any of the benefits of modern travel methods or radio communication. None of his voyages achieved its primary objective; over the ensuing decades, Shackleton's status as a polar hero was generally outshone by that of Scott, whose polar party had by 1925 been commemorated on more than thirty monuments in Britain alone, including stained glass windows, statues, busts and memorial tablets. A statue of Shackleton designed by Charles Sargeant Jagger was unveiled at the Kensington headquarters of the RGS in 1932, but public memorials to him were relatively few. The printed word gave much more attention to Scott—a forty-page booklet titled "Shackleton in the Antarctic", published in 1943 by OUP as part of a "Great Exploits" series, is described by cultural historian Stephanie Barczewski as "a lone example of a popular literary treatment of Shackleton in a sea of similar treatments of Scott". This disparity continued into the 1950s.

In the preface to his 1922 book The Worst Journey in the World, Apsley Cherry-Garrard (who had accompanied Scott on the Terra Nova Expedition) wrote: "For a joint scientific and geographical piece of organisation, give me Scott; for a Winter Journey, Wilson; for a dash to the Pole and nothing else, Amundsen: and if I am in the devil of a hole and want to get out of it, give me Shackleton every time." This statement was paraphrased by one of Shackleton's contemporaries, Sir Raymond Priestley, in his 1956 address to the British Science Association, thus: "Scott for scientific method, Amundsen for speed and efficiency but when disaster strikes and all hope is gone, get down on your knees and pray for Shackleton."

=== Later ===
In April 1959, Alfred Lansing's Endurance: Shackleton's Incredible Voyage was published. This was the first of a number of books about Shackleton that began to appear, showing him in a highly positive light. At the same time, attitudes towards Scott were gradually changing as a more critical note was sounded in the literature, culminating in Roland Huntford's 1979 treatment of him in his dual biography Scott and Amundsen, described by Barczewski as a "devastating attack". This negative picture of Scott became accepted as the popular truth, as the kind of heroism that he represented fell victim to the cultural shifts of the late twentieth century. Within a few years, Scott was thoroughly overtaken in public esteem by Shackleton, whose popularity surged while that of his erstwhile rival declined. In 2002, in a BBC poll conducted to determine the "100 Greatest Britons", Shackleton was ranked 11th while Scott was down in 54th place.

Margaret Morrell and Stephanie Capparell presented Shackleton as a model for corporate leadership in their 2001 book Shackleton's Way: Leadership Lessons from the Great Antarctic Explorer. They wrote: "Shackleton resonates with executives in today's business world. His people-centred approach to leadership can be a guide to anyone in a position of authority". Other management writers soon followed this lead, using Shackleton as an exemplar for bringing order from chaos. Nancy Koehn argued that, in spite of Shackleton's mistakes, financial problems and narcissism, he developed the capability to be successful.

The Centre for Leadership Studies at the University of Exeter offers a course on Shackleton, which also features in the management education programmes of several American universities. In Boston, a "Shackleton School" was set up on "Outward Bound" principles, with the motto "The Journey is Everything". Shackleton has also been cited as a model leader by the US Navy, and in a textbook on Congressional leadership, Peter L. Steinke calls Shackleton the archetype of the "nonanxious leader" whose "calm, reflective demeanor becomes the antibiotic warning of the toxicity of reactive behaviour". In 2001, the Athy Heritage Centre-Museum (now the Shackleton Museum), Athy, County Kildare, Ireland, established the Ernest Shackleton Autumn School, which is held annually, to honour the memory of Ernest Shackleton.

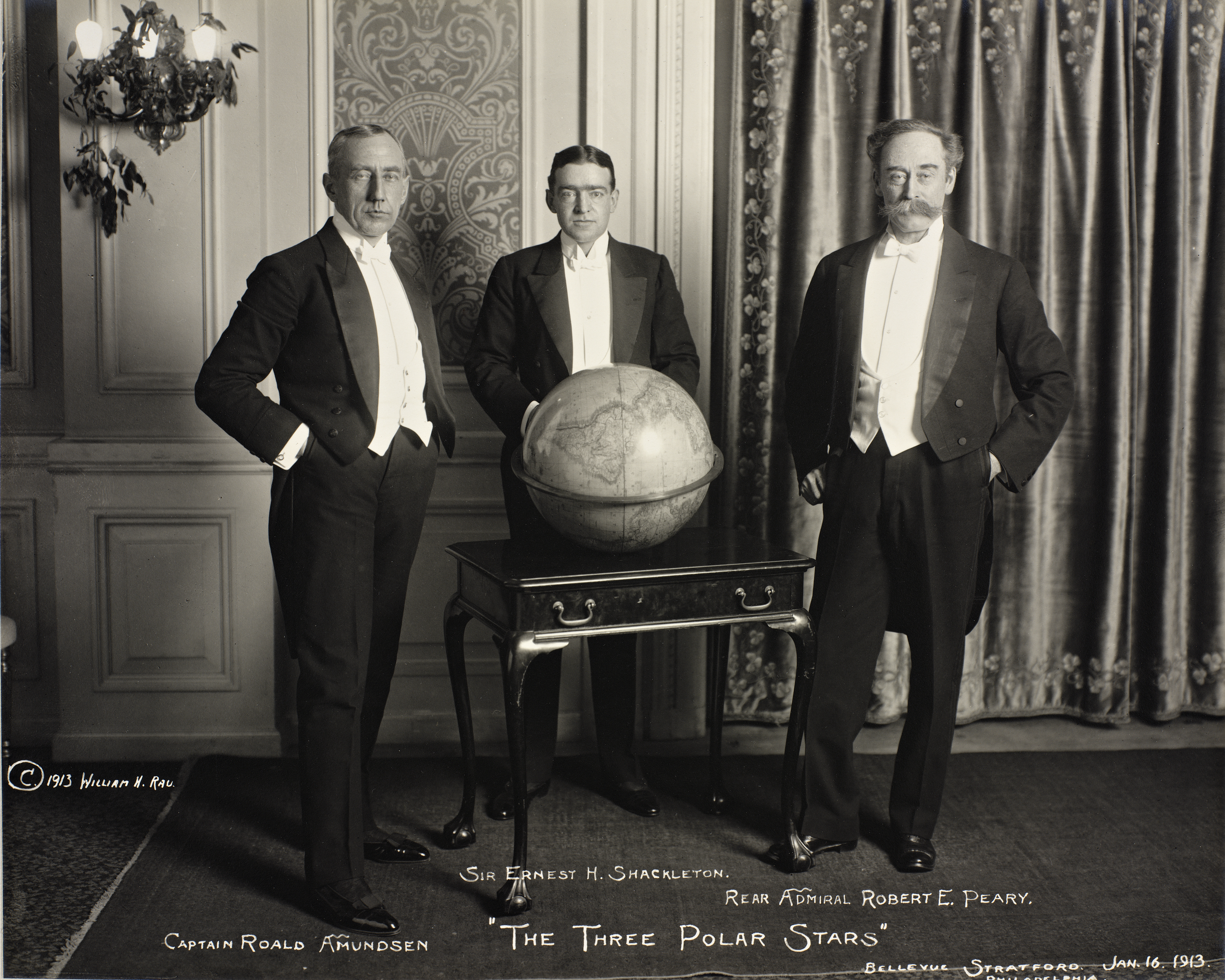
Shackleton (centre) with fellow explorers Amundsen (left) and Peary (right), 1913

In 1993, Trevor Potts re-enacted the boat journey from Elephant Island to South Georgia in honour of Shackleton, totally unsupported, in a replica of the James Caird.

An asteroid discovered by Swiss amateur astronomer Michel Ory in March 2005 was named "289586 Shackleton" in his memory.

At a Christie's auction in London in 2011, a biscuit that Shackleton gave "a starving fellow traveller" on the 1907‍–‍1909 Nimrod Expedition sold for £1,250. That same year, on the date of what would have been Shackleton's 137th birthday, Google honoured him with a Google Doodle.

In January 2013, a joint British-Australian team set out to duplicate Shackleton's 1916 trip across the Southern Ocean. Led by explorer and environmental scientist Tim Jarvis, the team was assembled at the request of Alexandra Shackleton, Sir Ernest's granddaughter, who felt the trip would honour her grandfather's legacy. This team became the first to replicate the so-called "double crossing", sailing from Elephant Island to South Georgia and crossing the South Georgian mountains from King Haakon Bay (where Shackleton had landed nearly 100 years prior) to Stromness. The expedition very carefully matched legacy conditions, using a replica of the James Caird (named for the project's patron: the Alexandra Shackleton), period clothing (by Burberry), replica rations (both in calorific content and rough constitution), period navigational aids, and a Thomas Mercer chronometer just as Shackleton had used. This expedition was made into a documentary film, screening as Chasing Shackleton on PBS in the US, and Shackleton: Death or Glory elsewhere on the Discovery Channel.

A genus of lichen-forming fungi in the Teloschistaceae family was published in 2013 as Shackletonia by botanists Søchting, Frödén & Arup. In October 2015, Shackleton's decorations and medals were auctioned at Christie's, raising a total of £585,000. Shackleton featured on a series of UK postage stamps issued by the Royal Mail in January 2016 to mark the centenary of the Endurance expedition. In August 2016, a statue of Shackleton by Mark Richards was erected in Athy, sponsored by Kildare County Council.

In February 2024 a memorial plaque to Shackleton sculpted by Will Davies was unveiled in the south cloister of Westminster Abbey by Anne, Princess Royal.

Lego included Shackleton's lifeboat as a Gift with Purchase for anyone who bought the Endurance between a certain timeframe. Included is a minifigure of Shackleton and photographer Frank Hurley.

== In the arts and popular media ==
Expedition member and cinematographer Frank Hurley took many photographs and much footage of the expedition. His silent documentary film In the Grip of the Polar Pack Ice was released in 1919. The film was restored by the British Film Institute in 1996, and digitally remastered version released in 2022, as South: Sir Ernest Shackleton's Glorious Epic of the Antarctic.

In 1983, the BBC produced a four-part miniseries, Shackleton, starring David Schofield in the title role and David Rodigan as Frank Wild. Originally broadcast on BBC Two, the series was released on DVD in March 2017. Shackleton also appeared in the first episode of the 1985 Central Television serial The Last Place on Earth, in which he was portrayed by James Aubrey.

A photography exhibition titled "The Endurance: Shackleton's Legendary Antarctic Expedition" was open to the public for six months from April to October 1999 at the American Museum of Natural History in New York City. It included artefacts, film footage and diaries from the 1914 expedition, as well as a chronological display of more than 150 photographs taken by Frank Hurley, all specially reprinted from the original negatives.

In 2002, Channel 4 in the UK produced Shackleton, a TV serial depicting the 1914 expedition with Kenneth Branagh in the title role. Broadcast in the US on the A&E Network, it won two Emmy Awards.

The musical play Ernest Shackleton Loves Me by Val Vigoda and Joe DiPietro made its debut in 2017 at the Tony Kiser Theater, an off-Broadway venue in New York City. Blended with a parallel story of a struggling composer, the play retells the adventure of Endurance in detail, incorporating photos and videos of the journey.

== Awards and decorations ==
British decorations:

- Knight Bachelor (1909)
- Member of the Royal Victorian Order (MVO 4th Class), 1907
- Commander of the Royal Victorian Order (CVO), 1909
- Officer of the Order of the British Empire (OBE), Military Division (1919)
- Polar Medal with three clasps (1904, 1909, 1917)
- British War Medal for service in the Great War (1919)
- Allied Victory Medal, with emblem for Mentions in Dispatches (1919)

Foreign decorations:

- Knight of the Order of the Dannebrog of Denmark (1909)
- Knight of the Order of the Polar Star of Sweden (1909)
- Knight of the Order of St. Olav of Norway (1909)
- Officer of the Legion of Honour of France (1909)
- Knight of the Order of the Crown of Italy (1910)
- Order of Saint Anna, 3rd Class, of Russia (1910)
- Royal Crown of Prussia, 3rd Class (1911)
- Officer of the Order of Merit (Chile) (1916)

== Arms ==
Coat of arms of Ernest Shackleton
| Crest A poplar tree Proper charged with a buckle as in the arms. Escutcheon Or, on a fess Gules, three lozengy buckles, tongues paleways Gold; on a canton of the Second, a cross humettée of the Third. Motto Fortitudine Vincimus Orders Commander of the Royal Victorian Order (CVO) and Officer of the Order of the British Empire (OBE) |

== See also ==
- Aurora Australis, the first book produced in Antarctica, during the Nimrod Expedition
- Avro Shackleton, British long-range maritime patrol aircraft used by the Royal Air Force, named after him
- RRS Ernest Shackleton, a research ship formerly operated by the British Antarctic Survey
- Shackleton crater, an impact crater near the south pole of the Moon
- Third man factor, refers to the reported situations where an unseen presence such as a "spirit" provided comfort or support during traumatic experiences.
