= Clarence Hare =

Clarence Howard Hare (2 Dec 1880 – 31 May 1967) was born in New Zealand and worked in Antarctica as Captain Robert Falcon Scott's steward. He was part of the shore party at Hut Point during the Discovery Expedition of 1901–1904, and narrowly escaped death on Ross Island in March 1902.

== Antarctica ==
Hare was born in December 1880 in Invercargill, the son of a banker. He began his adult life as a clerk, and was employed in this position in November 1901 when the RRS Discovery made landfall in his then-home, Lyttelton. The ship dismissed its wardroom assistant and steward in this port, and Hare, who had befriended ship's officer Reginald Ford, was signed on the spot to fill the vacancy on the ship's roster. He soon learned that this assignment meant that he would be the personal steward of the ship's captain, Robert Falcon Scott. As a ship's captain on a vessel unofficially but firmly run along Royal Navy lines, Scott was rated to have a personal servant. Hare kept his own journal and counsel, observing at one point that his captain was "over sensitive and got worked up if things did not go as planned."

Soon after the expedition landed on Ross Island in March 1902, Hare joined a sledging party who intended to probe the 80-km. length of the island, with their goal that of reaching the other end, Cape Crozier. A blizzard hit the sledgers and Hare was physically separated from his party, slipping and falling down an icy slope. Lost and disoriented, he was without equipment to camp or build a fire for forty-eight hours. Hare later confessed that, lonely and discouraged, he had sat down in the snow to die; his life had been saved by a sled dog, Kid, whom Hare (who had no Polar experience) had treated as a sort of pet dog. While this type of contact between humans and sled dogs is not generally recommended, it had encouraged Kid to become affectionate with the human, and in this crisis Kid revived the endangered explorer by licking his face. Eventually, although completely alone, Hare managed to orient himself and return to base.

Hare remained at Hut Point during the winter of 1902, but returned to New Zealand in February 1903 aboard a relief ship, the Morning. He was awarded the Polar Medal for his part in the expedition. He again signed on to the Discovery in June 1904 to accompany the captain from New Zealand to London. This was his final Antarctic service; he returned to his native land. The New Zealand Culture Ministry reports that in later life, the banker's son worked as a piano tuner. When he died in May 1967, he was the final survivor of the Discovery Expedition.

=== Legacy ===
Hare Peak, a summit of the system of mountains that surmounts the eastern side of the Leigh Hunt Glacier, was named after Hare in 1962. It is located on the Dufek Coast within the Ross Dependency, a section of Antarctica that is under the nominal suzerainty of Hare's homeland of New Zealand.

=== Book ===
In September 2022, Clarence Hare's diary from the 1901 Discovery expedition to Antarctica was published for the first time.
