= McIlroy Peak =

Mountain in South Georgia

McIlroy Peak (54°11′S 36°46′W) is a peak rising to 745 metres (2,440 ft) west of Husvik Harbour and 0.8 nautical miles (1.5 km) south of Mount Barren, South Georgia. It was named by the UK Antarctic Place-Names Committee in 1990 after Dr. James A. McIlroy, surgeon on the British Imperial Trans-Antarctic Expedition, 1914–16, in the Endurance, and on the Shackleton–Rowett Expedition, 1921–22, in the Quest.
