= Browett =

Browett is a surname. Notable people with the surname include:

- George Browett (1929–1994), British trade union leader
- John Browett (born 1963), British businessman

== See also ==
- Browett, Lindley & Co, manufacturer
- Rowett
