= Rowett =

Surname

Rowett is a surname. Notable people with the surname include:

== People ==
- Catherine Rowett (born 1956), Former British Member of the European Parliament for the Green Party and philosophy Professor
- Gary Rowett (born 1974), English footballer and manager
- Henry Rowett, English cricketer in the 1760s
- John Quiller Rowett (1874–1924), British businessman in the spirits industry
- Richard Rowett (1830–1887), leading figure of nineteenth-century Illinois and American history
- Tim Rowett (born 1942), British video presenter about toys

== Other ==
- Rowett Island (South Shetland Islands)
- The Rowett Institute, Aberdeen, Scotland, researches nutrition

== See also ==
- Shackleton–Rowett Expedition (1921–22), Antarctica
- Rowetta, English singer
