= Rowat =

Rowat is a surname. Notable people with the surname include:

- Jessie Newbery (née Rowat, 1864–1948), Scottish artist and embroiderer
- Leanne Rowat, Canadian politician
- Linden Rowat (born 1989), Canadian hockey player

== See also ==
- Rowan (name)
- Rowatt
