= Cape Blake =

Rocky cape in Antarctica

Cape Blake (68°26′S 148°55′E) is a rocky cape on the Organ Pipe Cliffs, 4 nautical miles (7 km) west of Cape Wild. Discovered by the Australasian Antarctic Expedition (1911–1914) under Douglas Mawson, who named it for L.R. Blake, geologist and cartographer with the Macquarie Island party of the expedition.
