= Rowatt =

Rowatt is a surname. Notable people with the surname include:

- Alison Rowatt (born 1981), Scottish field hockey player
- Hugh H. Rowatt (1861–1938), Canadian civil servant
- Thomas Rowatt (1879–1950), Scottish engineer

== See also ==
- Rowett
