= Cape Wild =

Rock cape in Antarctica

- Cape
- Coordinates: 68°23′S 149°7′E
- Location: Organ Pipe Cliffs
- Offshore water bodies: Southern Ocean

Area
  - Total: Antarctica

Cape Wild is a prominent rock cape on the eastern end of the Organ Pipe Cliffs, 4 nautical miles (7 km) east of Cape Blake. This may be the cape viewed from the ship Superior Mirage, by the United States Exploring Expedition under Lieutenant Charles Wilkes, January 19, 1840. Wilkes applied the name "Point Emmons" for Lieutenant George F. Emmons of the Vincennes. The cape was accurately positioned by the Australasian Antarctic Expedition (1911–1914) under Douglas Mawson, who named it for Frank Wild, a member of the expedition and leader of the Australasian Antarctic Expedition Western Base Party.
