= Organ Pipe Cliffs =

Line of coastal cliffs in Antarctica

- Cliffs
- Coordinates: 68°25′S 149°4′E
- Location: George V Land
- Offshore water bodies: Southern Ocean

Area
  - Total: Antarctica

Organ Pipe Cliffs is a line of coastal cliffs in the form of palisades of columnar dolerite overlooking the sea to the west of Cape Wild. Discovered by the Australasian Antarctic Expedition (1911–1914) under Douglas Mawson, who named them because of the similarity of the rock structure to organ pipes.

== Landforms ==
- Cape Blake
- Cape Wild
