= James McIlroy (surgeon) =

British surgeon and polar explorer (1879–1968)

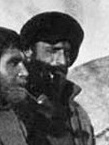
James McIlroy as a member of the Elephant Island party

James Archibald McIlroy (3 November 1879 – 27 July 1968) was a British surgeon and a member of Sir Ernest Shackleton's crew on the Imperial Trans-Antarctic Expedition (1914-1916).

== Early life and career ==
He was born in the Irish province of Ulster, almost certainly in the County Antrim market town Ballyclare where his father hailed from. The family later moved to Kings Norton, Birmingham, England, where he attended grammar school.

After McIlroy earned his medical degree at Birmingham University, he was for a brief time a surgeon at Queen Elizabeth Hospital in Birmingham. He spent several of the following years practicing medicine in Egypt, in Japan, and as a ship's surgeon on cruise ships in and around the East Indies.

== First Shackleton expedition ==
In 1914, McIlroy, along with Alexander Macklin, were the two physicians assigned under Shackleton on 'Endurance', the Imperial Trans-Antarctic Expedition, despite suffering from malaria. Known by the nickname of Mick during the expedition, McIlroy was described by Endurance author Alfred Lansing as "a handsome, aristocratic-looking individual" who was seen by his fellow crew as a "man of the world". He was known to entertain his crew mates with the stories of his exploits sailing around the world. McIlroy was also in charge of a sled-dog team when the expedition was cast away on the Weddell Sea. He also played the banjo in the team's musical ensemble. After the castaways found a refuge on Elephant Island, McIlroy was the surgeon performing the amputation of Perce Blackborow's gangrenous toes, with Macklin serving as anaesthetist, carefully administering a tiny quantity of salvaged chloroform as anaesthesia. After the rescue of McIlroy and his comrades, the physician was awarded the Silver Polar Medal.

== Second Shackleton expedition ==
After his convalescence from his injuries he incurred during the Great War, McIlroy journeyed to Africa and took up cotton farming with Frank Wild and Francis Bickerton in Malawi, then known as Nyasaland. In 1921 he signed up as a surgeon with Shackleton on another polar expedition, 'Quest', (the Shackleton–Rowett Expedition); Shacketon died on board ship off South Georgia Island, however, and the mission was completed by explorer Frank Wild (1873-1939).

== Military service ==
During the First World War, he was badly wounded at Ypres.

In the Second World War, McIlroy was serving on the S.S. Oronsay when it was torpedoed off the coast of West Africa, spending five days on an open boat before being rescued by the French ship Dumont d’Urville.

== Later life ==
After the war, he remained a ship's surgeon well into his late seventies, working for the P&O and Clan Line shipping lines. He died, at the age of 88, in Surrey, England.

== Legacy ==
In 1990 the UK Antarctic Place-Names Committee named a peak after McIlroy. McIlroy Peak rises to 745 metres (2,440 ft) west of Husvik Harbour and 0.8 nautical miles (1.5 km) south of Mount Barren, South Georgia.

In the 2002 Shackleton television film, McIlroy was portrayed by actor Pip Torrens.
