= Leslie Russell Blake =

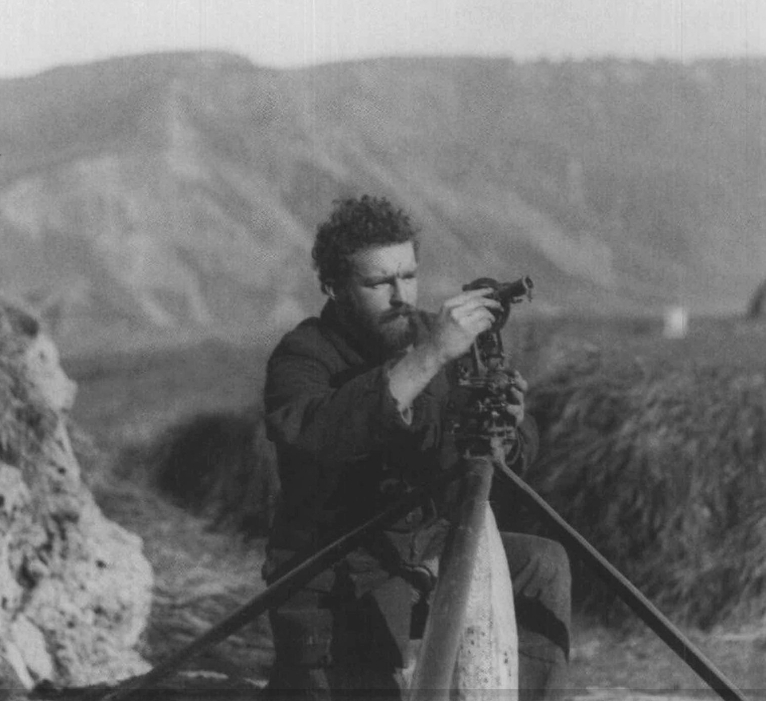
Blake surveying in 1912

Leslie Russell Blake (28 October 1890 – 3 October 1918) was an Australian geologist and Antarctic explorer. He produced maps of Macquarie Island which were used in the geology work of Douglas Mawson. He served in World War I and was killed in France in an accidental bombshell explosion. Cape Blake is named after him.

== Life and work ==
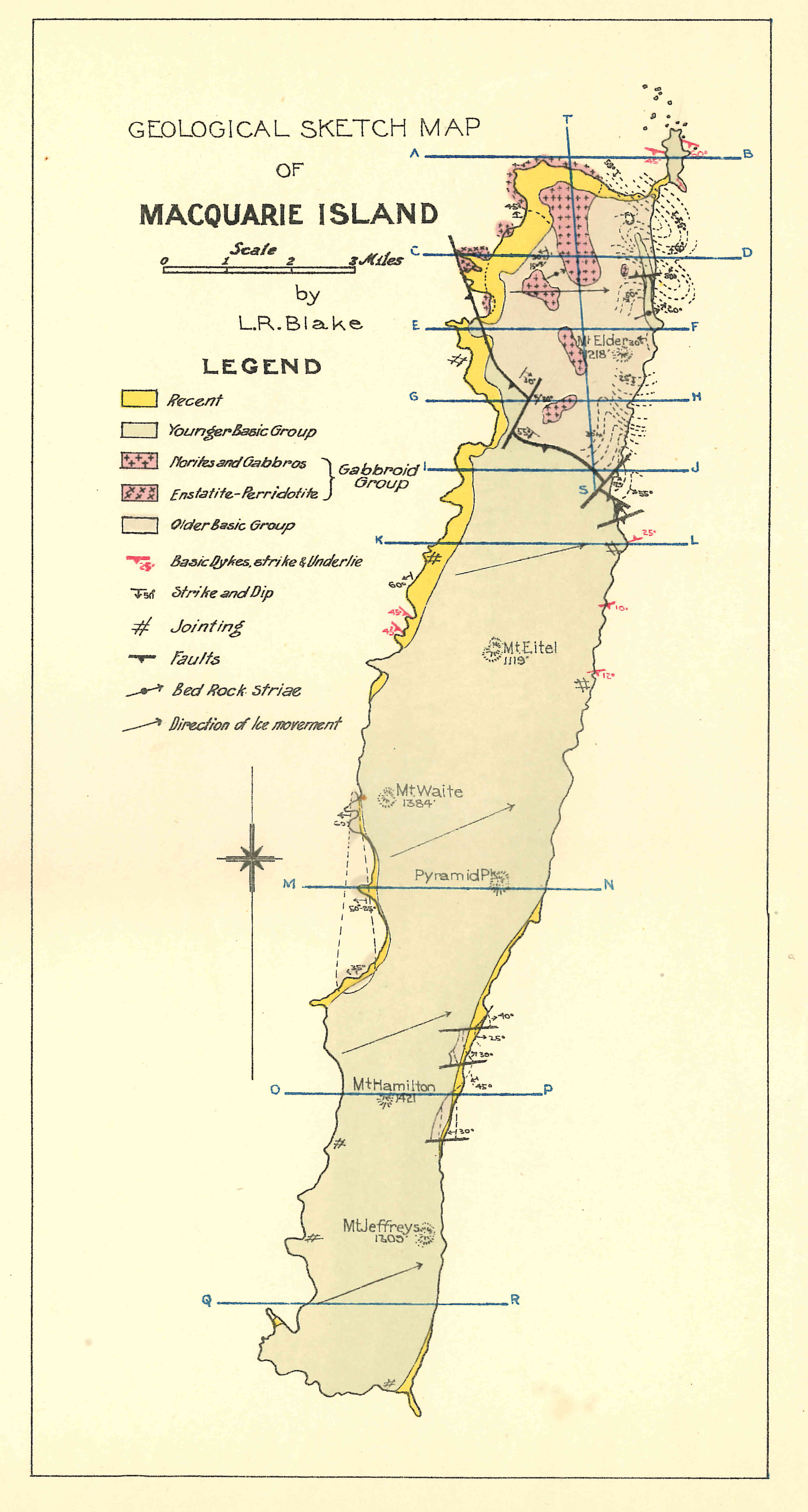
Blake's map of Macquarie Island

Blake was born in Hawthorn, Victoria, to Suffolk-born photographer Thomas Henry Blake (1851-1897) and Ceylon-born Maria Louisa Blake née Purdey (1857-1892). After the death of both parents, the children were brought up by a widowed aunt, Charlotte Jane Deazeley née Blake, in Queensland. He went to Brisbane Technical College and then passed the Sydney University Junior Public Examination. He joined the Queensland Public Service in 1907. He became a geological surveyor with the department of mines and travelled into Queensland exploring the Gympie goldfields.

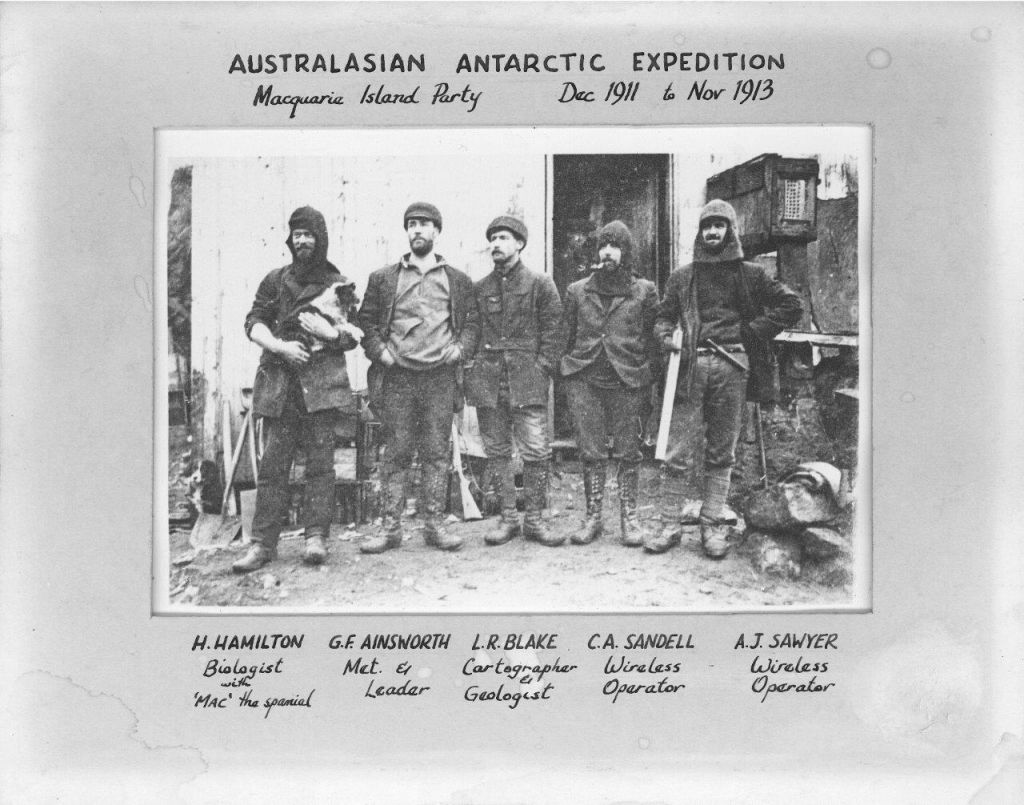
Blake in 1911 on Macquarie Island

In 1911 he was appointed geologist and surveyor for examining Macquarie Island in the Antarctic along with Charles Alfred Sandell, George Frederick Ainsworth, Arthur John Sawyer, and Harold Hamilton. Blake was involved in mapping the island with a triangulation system and a baseline of 2830.5 feet. The island is about 34 km wide at its widest and clear weather was needed for being able to see many of the survey poles. He also collected rocks and some natural history specimens including the egg of a royal penguin. The work continued despite interpersonal issues and supply shortages. In 1913 the death of Robert Falcon Scott and the story of expedition member Douglas Mawson who was lost for several days brought polar exploration into news focus. In November 1913, the remaining members who had stayed on Macquarie Island moved out aboard the S.Y. Aurora, to pick up another party on Shackleton Ice Shelf, and returned to Adelaide in February 1914. Blake then returned to Queensland and when World War I broke out, he enlisted. He however missed a bus and he had to go back to his camp. He applied to the Australian Army as a commissioned engineer in 1915 and after receiving no communication he applied in the artillery. He was however declared medically unfit. He then underwent a surgery that made him acceptable and in August 1915 he became gunner (no. 7306) and received training at Enoggera Camp, Brisbane. He was sent into France in March 1916 and while fighting in the trenches, he was slightly injured by sniper fire. He helped survey trenching that reduced the number of deaths for which he later received a Military Cross. On the Western Front, he met photographer Frank Hurley, who had formerly been in Shackleton's Antarctic Expedition. Hurley took several pictures of Blake in the war zone. In September 1917, he was injured by shrapnel that went right through his arm between his ulna and radius. He was sent to Wandsworth General Hospital in London and rejoined his unit in 1918, promoted as a captain. He was posted as a staff officer at headquarters in Tincourt although he sought to be in the 105 Howitzer Battery. He was killed in an accident when an artillery shell exploded while he was on horseback supervising the unloading of a train. The horse was killed and he had injuries on his legs and head. He was taken to the local casualty station where he died the next day.

Blake received a military cross for conspicuous gallantry on 25 November 1916 with a citation "He carried out reconnaissances under very heavy fire with great courage and determination, obtaining most valuable information." He sent the military cross to his fiancee Frances Eileen Elliot and a French newspaper had reported in 1918 that he was seeking leave to get married. Elliott never married and died in 1977.

Blake's map of Macquarie Island was published in 1943 by Douglas Mawson who also made use of Blake's notes. He however did not include Blake as an author. Blake had assumed that the island had been covered by a glacier and this was also followed by Mawson. It is now considered that the island was actually on the ocean floor and lifted up by faulting. The heights measured on various peaks had a variable amount of error, however the map was influential for several decades before it was replaced by new ones.
