= Mount Barren =

Mountain in South Georgia

Mount Barren (54°10′S 36°45′W) is a mountain, 645 metres (2,120 ft) high, standing west of Husvik Harbour on the north coast of South Georgia. Its name is descriptive, and was probably given by the Discovery Investigations in 1926–30. Mount Barren lies 0.8 nautical miles (1.5 km) north of McIlroy Peak named after British surgeon Dr James McIlroy (surgeon).
