= Rowett Island (South Shetland Islands) =

Antarctic island

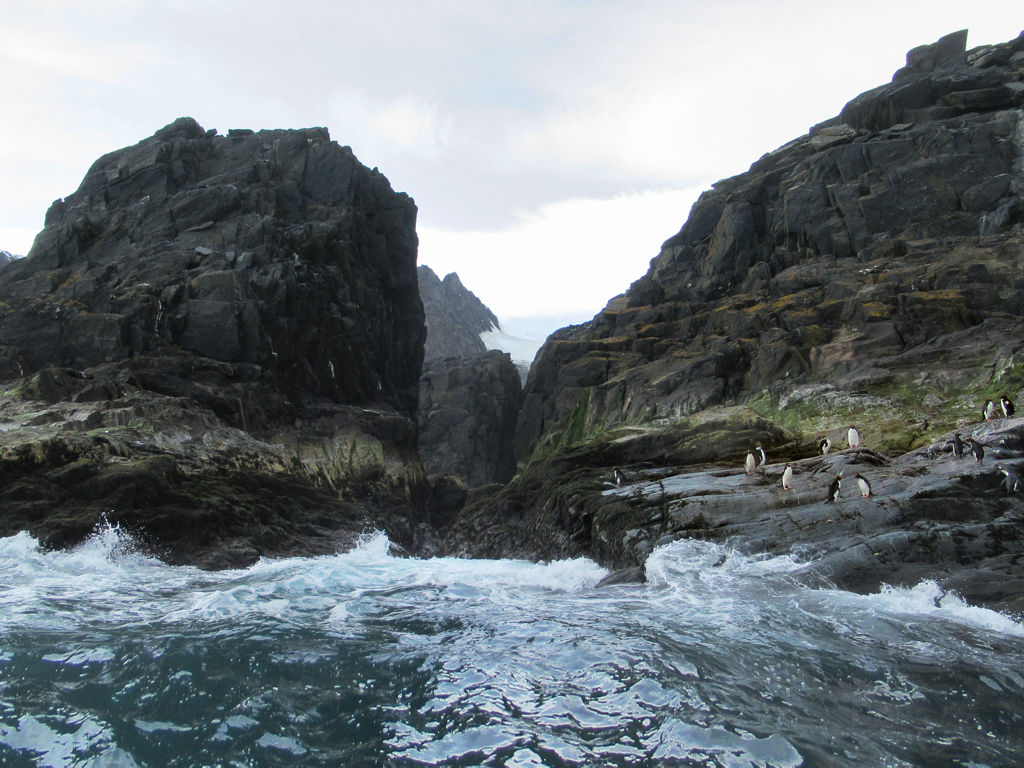
- Rowett Island

- Location within Antarctic Peninsula Location within Antarctica

Geography
- Location: Antarctica
- Coordinates: 61°17′S 55°13′W
- Archipelago: South Shetland Islands
- Length: 0.5 mi (0.8 km)

Administration
- Antarctica
- Administered under the Antarctic Treaty System

Demographics
- Population: uninhabited

Rowett Island is a rocky island 0.5 miles (0.8 km) long, lying immediately off Cape Lookout, Elephant Island, in the South Shetland Islands. Rowett Island is located at 61°17′S 55°13′W. Rowett Island was known to American and British sealers as early as 1822. Rowett Island was named by members of a British expedition (1921-1922) under Ernest Shackleton for John Quiller Rowett, chief patron of the expedition.

== See also ==
- Composite Antarctic Gazetteer
- List of Antarctic and sub-Antarctic islands
- List of Antarctic islands south of 60° S
- SCAR
- Territorial claims in Antarctica
