= Quest (ship) =

Steam-powered schooner on which Shackleton died

Coordinates: 53°10′N 54°27′W

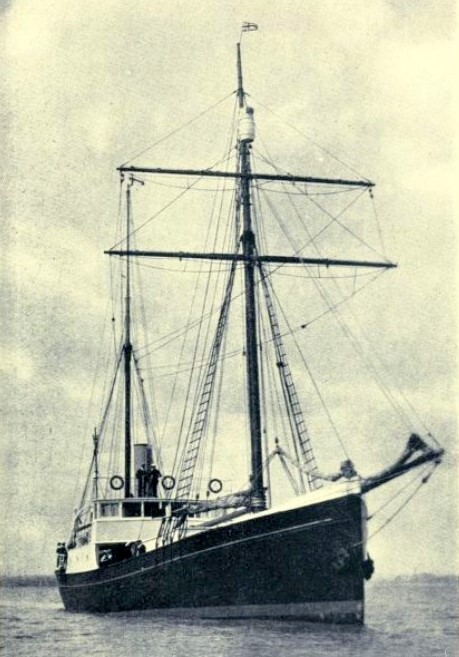
- Quest

History
- Name: Foca I (1917–21); Quest RYS (1921–23); Quest (1923–40); HMS Quest (1940–46); Quest (1946–62)
- Owner: A Ingebrigtsen (1917–21); E Shackleton (1921–23); W G Oliffe (1923–24); Schjelderups Sælfangstrederi AS (1924–39); Skips-AS Quest (1939–62)
- Operator: A Ingebrigtsen (1917–21); E Shackleton (1921–23); W G Oliffe (1923–24); T Schjelderup (1924–39); I Austad (1939–40); Nortraship (1940); Royal Navy (1940–46); Nortraship (1946)
- Port of registry: (Norway) Høvik (1917–21); (United Kingdom of Great Britain and Ireland) Cowes (1921–23); (United Kingdom) Cowes (1923–24); (Norway) Bodø (1924–39); (Norway) Tromsø (1939–40); (United Kingdom) Royal Navy (1940–46); (Norway) Tromsø (1946–62)
- Builder: Erik Lindstøls Båtbyggeri, Risør
- Launched: 1917
- Identification: Fishery registration K-13-K (1917–21); Fishery registration N-94-BN (1924–39); Fishery registration T-24-T (1939–62); British Official number 135395 (1921–23); Code Letters KJHV (1921–23); Code Letters LJBT (1924–34); Code Letters LCVR (1934–62)
- Fate: Foundered 5 May 1962 in the Labrador Sea

General characteristics
- Type: Sealer (1917–21); Research Vessel (1921–24); Sealer (1924–40); Minesweeper (1940–46); Sealer (1946–62)
- Tonnage: 209 GRT; 94 NRT
- Length: 110 ft 7 in (33.71 m)
- Beam: 24 ft 9 in (7.54 m)
- Depth of hold: 11 ft 8 in (3.56 m)
- Propulsion: Sails, aided by compound steam engine (1917–39); Diesel engine (1939–62)
- Sail plan: Schooner

Quest was a low-powered, schooner-rigged steamship that sailed from 1917 until sinking in 1962, best known as the polar exploration vessel of the Shackleton–Rowett Expedition of 1921–1922. It was aboard this vessel that Sir Ernest Shackleton died on 5 January 1922 while in harbour in South Georgia. Prior to and after the Shackleton–Rowett Expedition, Quest operated in commercial service as a seal-hunting vessel or "sealer". Quest was also the primary expedition vessel of the British Arctic Air Route Expedition to the east coast of the island of Greenland in 1930–1931.

Quest was 111 feet (34 m) in length, had a beam of 24 feet (7.3 m), and 12 feet (3.7 m) depth of hold. The vessel has been variously rated at 209 and 214 gross register tons, possibly due to the 1924 refit described below.

== Shackleton–Rowett Expedition ==
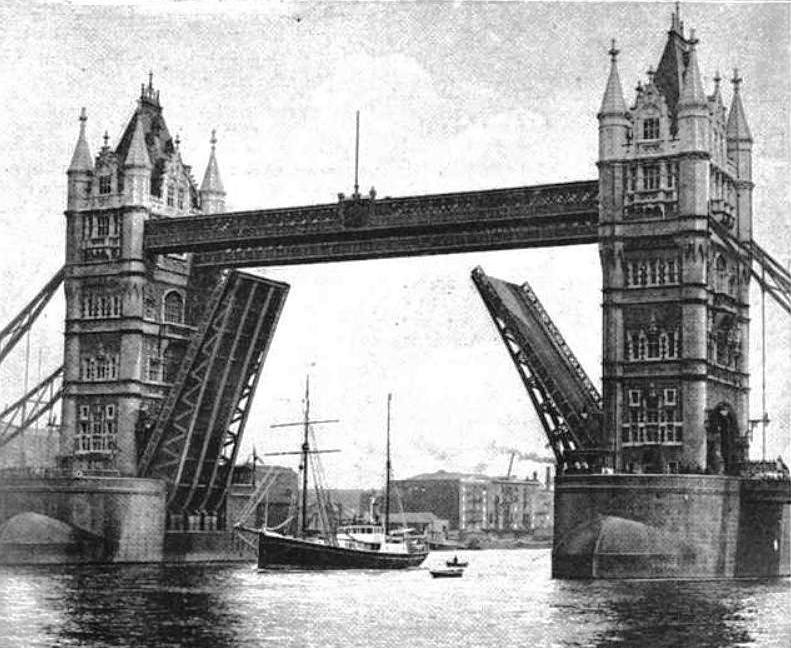
Quest under Tower Bridge, 1921

Quest was built in 1917 in Risør, Norway, originally as the wooden-hulled sealer Foca I. She was the polar expedition vessel of the Shackleton–Rowett Expedition of 1921–1922 and was renamed Quest by Lady Emily Shackleton, the wife of expedition commander Ernest Shackleton. At the expense of expedition financier John Quiller Rowett, the small ship was refitted for the expedition with modifications overseen by sailing master Frank Worsley, including re-rigging and the addition of a deckhouse. As Shackleton was a member of the Royal Yacht Squadron, Quest bore the RYS suffix for this voyage and flew the White Ensign.

Sailing from London for the Southern Ocean on 17 September 1921, Quest reached South Georgia on 4 January 1922 while preparing to enter Antarctic waters. The following night, Shackleton died aboard the vessel while she was at anchor in Grytviken, ending all prospects of the expedition carrying out its original program of exploring the Antarctic coastline of Enderby Land. Led by Frank Wild, Quest carried out a desultory survey of the Weddell Sea area before returning to the South Atlantic. She touched the Tristan da Cunha archipelago in early May, and at Inaccessible Island, ornithologist Hubert Wilkins took type specimens of the grosbeak bunting.

The expedition returned to England in July 1922, having posted disappointing results attributed by author Roland Huntford both to replacement commander Wild's alcoholism, and deficiencies in Quest's performance in polar sea ice. The ship's engine was weakly powered and caused continuous difficulties, and the vessel's straight stem made her unsuitable for use in icy seas.

== East Greenland expeditions ==
Quest was again refitted in Norway in 1924; during the refit, the Shackleton–Rowett deckhouse was salvaged for shore use. In 1928, the refitted vessel participated in the effort to rescue the survivors of the Italia Arctic airship crash. Described as a "broad-beamed, tubby little ship, decks stacked with gear", the ageing sealer served in 1930 as the primary expedition vessel and transport from London to eastern Greenland for the explorers of the British Arctic Air Route Expedition led by Gino Watkins. Between 1932 and 1936, she was the expedition ship for the East Greenland ventures of Count Gaston Micard.

== Return to service, sinking and discovery ==
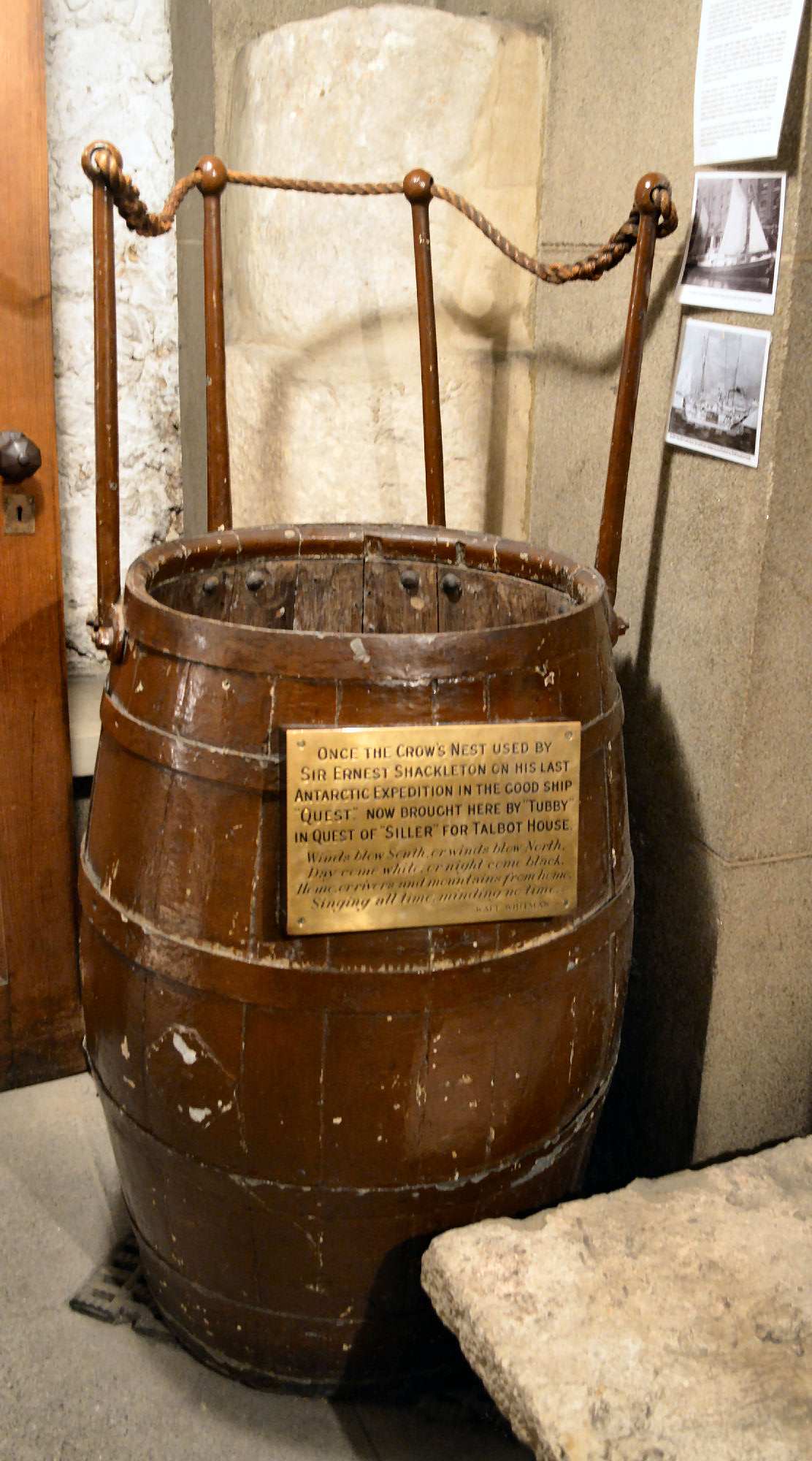
The crow's nest from the 1921–1922 voyage

Quest returned to service as a sealing vessel after 1930. In 1935 she was used by the British East Greenland Expedition. During World War II the wooden-hulled vessel was pressed into service as a minesweeper and light cargo vessel with Nortraship and the British navy. The small ship returned to her owners' sealing trade in 1946. On 5 May 1962, while on a seal-hunting expedition, Quest was holed by crushing ice and sank off the north coast of Labrador. The crew was saved.

Parts of the former deckhouse, including Shackleton's cabin in 1921–1922, survive and, as of 2021 are in the Athy Heritage Center – Museum in Ireland. The crow's nest, made from a barrel, is in the crypt of All Hallows-by-the-Tower, London.

An archival collection of 476 photographs from the Quest/Shackleton-Rowett Expedition is maintained by the State Library of New South Wales in Sydney, Australia.

Quest was located on 9 June 2024 at the bottom of the Labrador Sea, about 85 kilometres (53 mi) off Labrador's east coast and about 2.5 kilometres (1.6 mi) from her last reported position, by a wreck hunting team led by John Geiger of the Royal Canadian Geographical Society on the search vessel LeeWay Odyssey (Levi Nippard, captain). She was found at a depth of 390 metres (1,280 ft) of water, sitting almost upright, and appearing to be broadly intact save for a broken main mast. The team included shipwreck hunter David Mearns and lead researcher geographer Antoine Normandin; the explorer's granddaughter Hon. Alexandra Shackleton was co-patron of the expedition along with Chief Mi'sel Joe of Miawpukek First Nation.

== See also ==
- List of Antarctic exploration ships from the Heroic Age, 1897–1922
