= John Quiller Rowett =

British businessman and philanthropist (1876–1924)

- Born: 19 September 1876; Rangoon, Burma
- Died: 1 October 1924 (aged 48)
- Occupations: Businessman, philanthropist
- Known for: Financial backer for Shackleton's final Antarctic venture

John Quiller Rowett (19 September 1876 – 1 October 1924) was a British businessman, philanthropist, who endowed the Rowett Research Institute. His wealth and business expertise were instrumental in supporting ambitious projects, most famously his backing of Ernest Shackleton’s final Antarctic expedition, on RYS Quest - The Shackleton-Rowett Expedition.

== Early life ==
Rowett's family came originally from Polperro, Cornwall. Rowett was born on 19 September 1876 in Rangoon (now Yangon), Myanmar. After the death of his father, the family returned to Cornwall. In 1889, they moved to Sydenham, London, to enable John to attend Dulwich College, where he became a friend of fellow student Ernest Shackleton.

== Career ==
Rowett made his fortune through a wine and spirits business that he established in the early 1900's. He became a dominant player in the market for rum, and his firms supplied most of the rum to the Allied Forces during the First World War. At this time he became increasingly involved in philanthropic ventures, endowing the Rowett Research Institute, various medical causes and a community centre in Polperro, Cornwall. In 1921-22 he served as Master of the Worshipful Company of Fruiterers. In 1923/4 he suffered catastrophic losses through ventures associated with the Scotch whisky entrepreneur Sir John Stewart.

== Rowett Research Institute ==
Though a layman, Rowett was fascinated by science. In 1920, a Dulwich College school friend, the University of Aberdeen biochemist Professor Robert H A Plimmer introduced Rowett to John Boyd Orr. Boyd Orr was seeking funding for the expansion of an institute for research into animal nutrition formed some years earlier by the University of Aberdeen and the North Scotland College of Agriculture. Rowett agreed to provide £10,000 for the first year, £10,000 for the second year, and gave an additional £2,000 for the purchase of a farm. By September 1922 the buildings were nearly completed, and the renamed Rowett Research Institute was opened shortly thereafter by Queen Mary.

== Shackleton ==
A schoolfriend of Sir Ernest Shackleton at Dulwich College, Rowett was the main financial backer for Shackleton's final Antarctic venture, the Shackleton–Rowett Expedition of 1921–1922, on the adapted sealer Quest. In 1920, Rowett promised a cornerstone amount towards the new expedition. At this time, Shackleton gave Rowett the James Caird, in which Shackleton had made his famed 1916 open-boat voyage from Elephant Island to South Georgia, to bring rescue to the stranded crew of the Endurance. In late May 1921, after Shackleton had failed to raise the remaining funds elsewhere, Rowett agreed to finance the entire Shackleton-Rowett Expedition. Having left England in September 1921, the expedition reached Grytviken, South Georgia on 4 January 1922. Shackleton died on board the Quest in the small hours of 5 January. After Shackleton's death, Rowett presented the James Caird to Dulwich College as a memorial to his school friend.

The expedition continued under the leadership of Frank Wild. In March 1922, Quest visited Elephant Island, where several of the crew had spent months waiting for rescue during the Imperial Trans-Antarctic Expedition. They named the nearby Rowett Island after the expedition's sponsor. A mountain on Gough Island, a remote volcanic island of the Tristan da Cunha group in the South Atlantic, is also named in Rowett's honour, after Quest's visit there in June 1922.

== Death ==
On 1 October 1924, Rowett was found dead at his London home, with a window cord around his neck. He was 48. The coroner returned a verdict of suicide.

== Sources ==
- Jan Chojecki (2022) The Quest Chronicle - The story of the Shackleton-Rowett Expedition
- Huntford, Roland (1985). Shackleton. London: Hodder & Stoughton. ISBN 0-340-25007-0.
- Kay, H. D. (1972). "John Boyd Orr. Baron Boyd Orr of Brechin
- "About the Institute". University of Aberdeen.
- "The Agricultural Association, the Development Fund, and the Origins of the Rowett Research Institute" (PDF). www.bahs.org.uk. Archived from the original (PDF) on 27 September 2007.
- The Tristan da Cunha Association Newsletter no. 53, August 2013
