= Frank Wild =

English sailor and polar explorer (1873–1939)

Frank Wild CBE FRGS
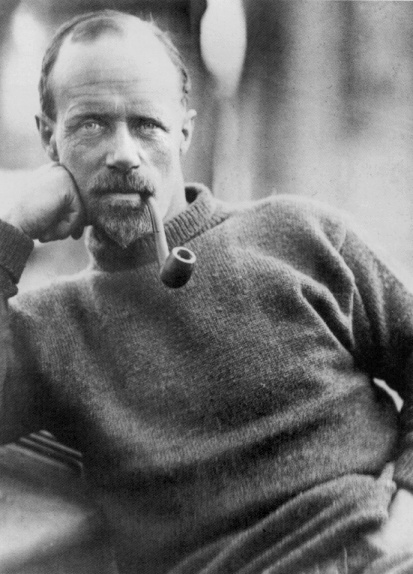
- Wild in 1914
- Born: John Robert Francis Wild; 18 April 1873; Skelton-in-Cleveland, Yorkshire, England
- Died: 19 August 1939 (aged 66); Klerksdorp, Cape Province, Union of South Africa
- Burial place: Grytviken, South Georgia; 54.28511944401586°S 36.50727886228288°W
- Occupations: Antarctic explorer, sailor
- Awards: Royal Geographical Society's Back Award (1916); Commander of the Order of the British Empire (1920); Royal Geographical Society's Patron's Medal (1924); Polar Medal with four clasps

Military service
- Branch: Merchant Navy; Royal Navy
- Service years: 1889–1939
- Rank: Lieutenant
- Unit: Royal Naval Reserve
- Expeditions: 1901–1904; 1907–1909; 1911–1914; 1914–1917; 1921–1922: 5 total; Discovery expedition; Nimrod expedition; Australasian expedition; Transantarctic expedition; Shackleton–Rowett expedition

John Robert Francis Wild CBE FRGS (18 April 1873 – 19 August 1939) was an English sailor and explorer. He participated in five expeditions to Antarctica during the Heroic Age of Antarctic Exploration, for which he was awarded the Polar Medal with four bars, one of only two men to be so honoured, the other being Ernest Joyce.

== Early life ==
Frank Wild was born in Skelton-in-Cleveland, North Riding of Yorkshire, the eldest of eight sons and three daughters born to Benjamin Wild, a schoolteacher, and his wife Mary (née Cook), a seamstress. The family came from Skelton close to Marton, birthplace of Captain James Cook, to whom the family claimed ancestry through Mrs. Wild; her father was Robert Cook, who claimed to be a grandson of the great explorer. By 1875, the Wild family had moved from Skelton to Stickford in Lincolnshire, and in late 1880 moved again to Wheldrake near York.

Wild's family next moved to the village of Eversholt in Bedfordshire. Here his father was appointed clerk of the Eversholt Parochial Charity at Woburn. Frank Wild was educated at Bedford. He joined the Merchant Navy in 1889 at the age of 16, receiving his early training in sail in the clipper ship Sobraon. In the British Merchant Navy, he rose to the rank of second officer. In 1900, aged 26, he joined the Royal Navy. The 1901 census shows that at that time, aged 27, he was serving as an able seaman on HMS Edinburgh, anchored in Sheerness Harbour.

== Antarctic exploration ==
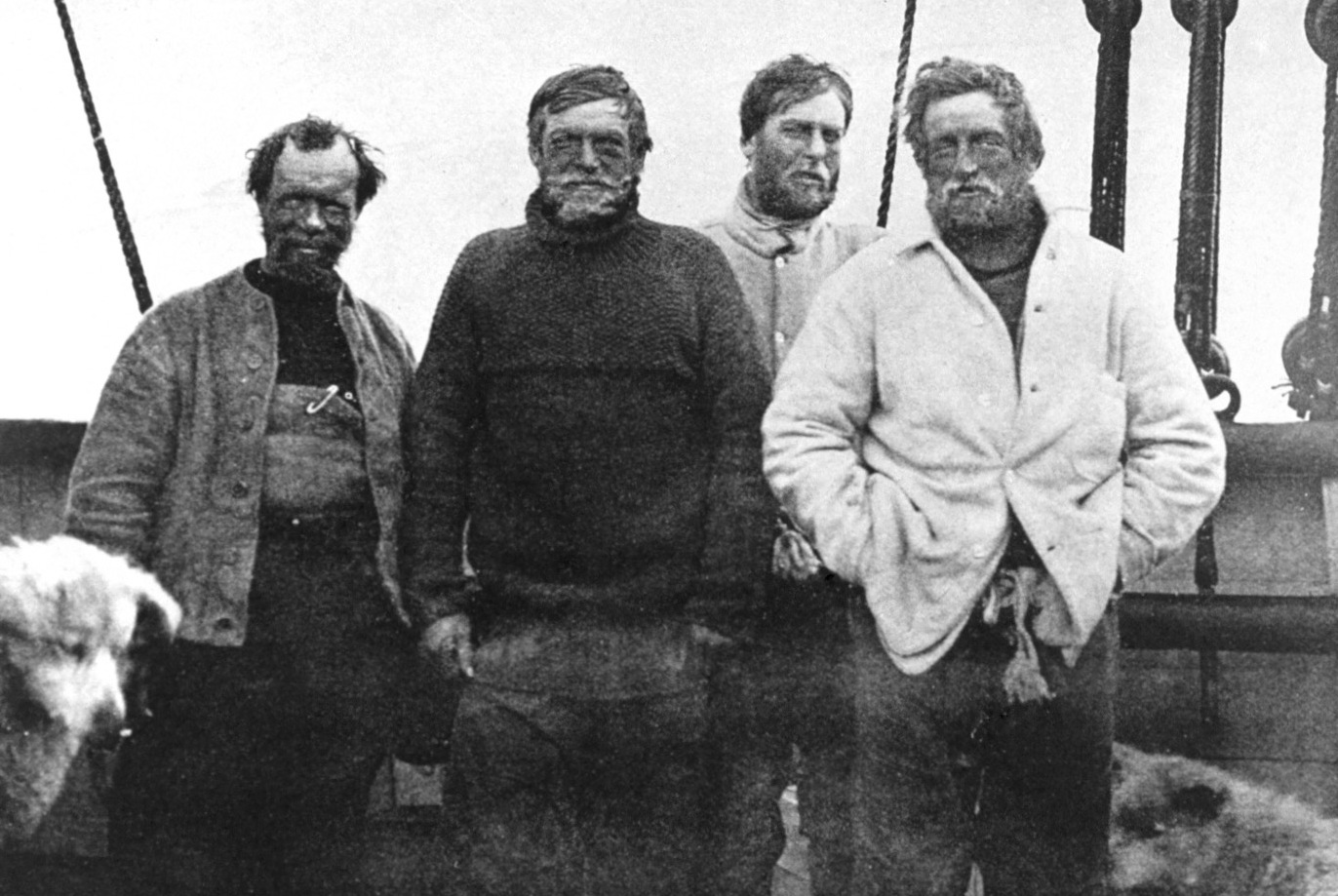
Frank Wild (left side) beside Shackleton

Wild took part in the following Antarctic expeditions:

- In 1901, he was a member of Robert Falcon Scott's crew as an able seaman on the Discovery, along with Ernest Shackleton, who was then a sub-lieutenant.
- In 1908–1909, he was a member of Shackleton's Nimrod Expedition and was a member of the team that crossed the Ross Barrier and Beardmore Glacier at a record latitude of 88º23'S.
- In 1911, he joined Douglas Mawson's Aurora expedition and was in charge of the western base on the Shackleton Ice Shelf.
- From 1914 to 1916, he served as Shackleton's second-in-command on the Imperial Trans-Antarctic Expedition.
- In 1921–1922, he served as second-in-command of the Shackleton–Rowett Expedition.

As second-in-command of Shackleton's Imperial Trans-Antarctic Expedition, Wild was left in charge of 21 men on desolate Elephant Island as Shackleton and a crew of five undertook an epic open-ocean voyage to South Georgia aboard the lifeboat James Caird in order to seek rescue. For more than four months, from 24 April to 30 August 1916, during the Antarctic winter, Wild and his crew waited on Elephant Island, surviving on a diet of seal, penguin and seaweed. They were finally rescued by Shackleton aboard the Chilean ship Yelcho. Point Wild on Elephant Island is named after Frank Wild; a monument dedicated to the Chilean captain Luis Pardo, who rescued him and his men, now stands at the site.

On returning to the United Kingdom in 1916, Wild volunteered for duty during World War I and was made a temporary lieutenant in the Royal Naval Volunteer Reserve. After taking a Russian language course, Wild became the Royal Navy's transport officer at Archangel, where he superintended the war materials which arrived during the Allied intervention in Russia. After the war, Wild went to the Union of South Africa, where he farmed in Nyasaland with Francis Bickerton and James McIlroy, two former Antarctic comrades.

From 1921 to 1922, Wild was second-in-command of the Shackleton–Rowett Expedition, on the converted Norwegian ship Quest. Shackleton died of a heart attack on South Georgia during the expedition, and Wild took over command and completed the journey, combating unfavourable weather to Elephant Island and along the Antarctic coast.

Wild's younger brother Ernest Wild also went on to become a Royal Naval seaman and Antarctic explorer, receiving a Polar Medal.

== Later years ==
On 24 October 1922, Wild married Vera Alexandra Altman (née Bogosoff), the widow of a tea planter of Borneo, at Reading Register Office. They had first met in 1918 when Wild was serving in Russia, and he had assisted her to obtain a passage home to England. After the Shackleton–Rowett Expedition, Wild returned to South Africa with Vera where he continued to farm. He bought some land in the Mkuzi valley in Zululand where he tried to grow cotton.

The enterprise was a financial disaster and after five years of drought followed by flood, Wild gave up. Next he was involved in railway construction and for a time had some success with a contract to extend the South African railway to the border with Swaziland. However, the contract ended and he was forced to seek employment elsewhere.

Wild's marriage to Vera was in difficulty shortly after arriving in Zululand and she asked for a divorce, which became absolute on 27 December 1928. Next, Wild took a temporary job as a hotel barman at Gollel in Swaziland which was owned by a friend of his. Caught in the 1930 Depression, he was forced to move from job to job, including working as a battery manager at a diamond mine which went bankrupt, prospecting in Rhodesia and managing a quarry. He subsidised his meagre income by giving the occasional lecture on the Endurance expedition.

He married for the second time on 18 March 1931. His new wife, Beatrice (Trixie) Lydia Rhys Rowbotham, was 47 years old and ten years his junior. They settled in Germiston, where in 1932, he worked supervising a stone-crushing machine at a Witwatersrand gold mine. Wild earned enough money not only to buy a car (a Wolseley) but to take two holidays in the hinterland and coast of South Africa.

Due to ill health, he was forced to leave the mining job and he was given a job by his brother-in-law Pat O'Brien Frost to oversee the building of Frost's house in Haenertsburg in the Eastern Transvaal. However, he had little respect for Frost; that and the demands of building the house in an extremely remote part of the country caused him to return to Johannesburg. He received the offer of a job as a storekeeper on the Babrosco Mine near Klerksdorp from his friend Jack Scott, the mining magnate. He had also been awarded the Civil List pension from Downing Street.

== Death ==
Wild died of pneumonia and diabetes in Klerksdorp on 19 August 1939, aged 66 years. He was cremated on 23 August 1939 at Braamfontein Cemetery in Johannesburg.

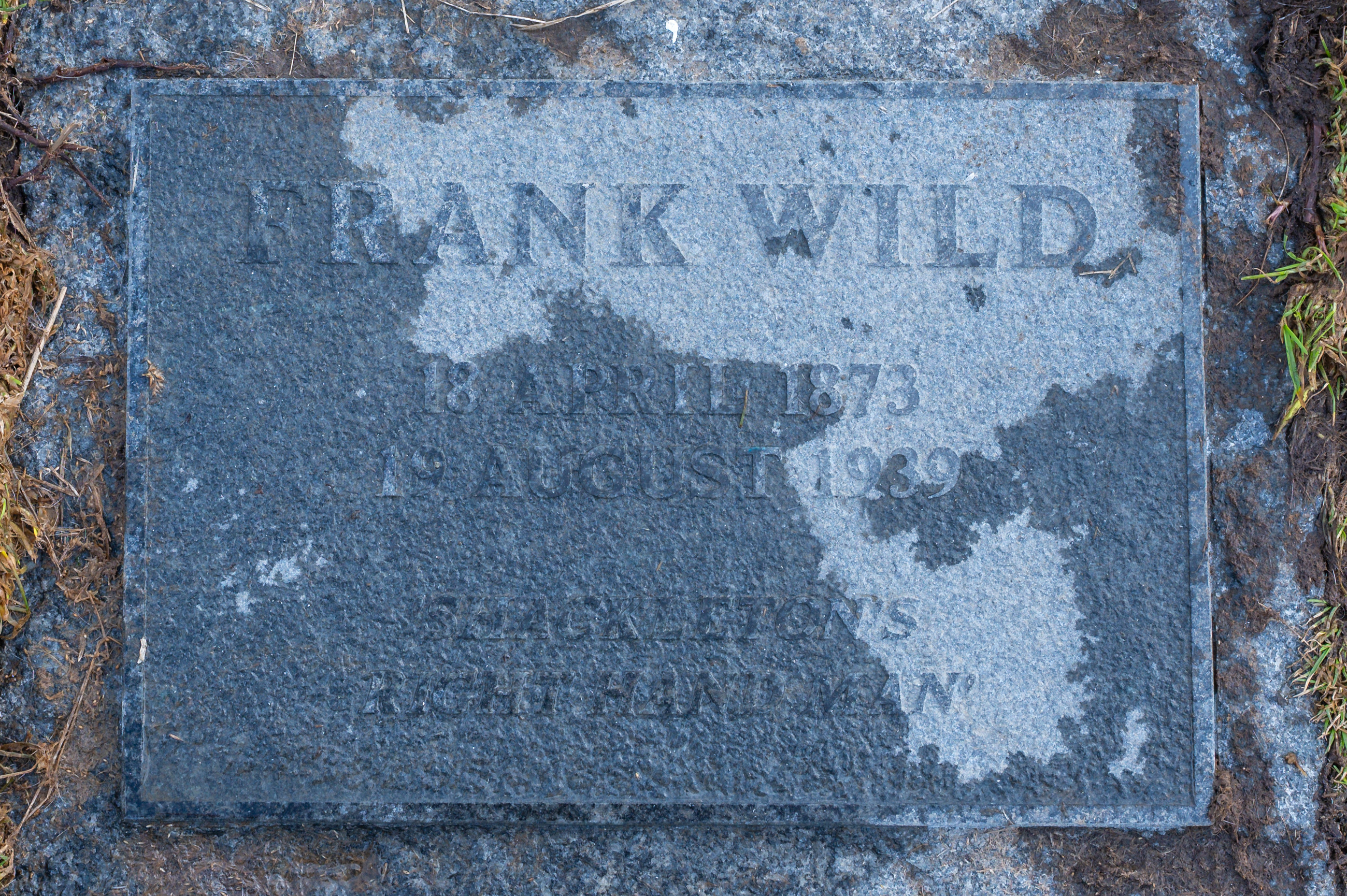
Frank Wild's gravestone in Grytviken Cemetery

In the 2000s, while journalist and author Angie Butler was researching a book about Wild she discovered his ashes were still in a vault at Braamfontein Cemetery. On 27 November 2011, the ashes of Frank Wild, Shackleton's "right-hand man", were interred on the right-hand side of Shackleton's grave site in Grytviken, South Georgia. Wild's relatives and Shackleton's granddaughter, the Hon. Alexandra Shackleton, attended a service conducted by the Rev Dr Richard Hines, rector of the Falkland Islands. Butler said, "His ashes will now be where they were always supposed to be. It just took them a long time getting there." The journey to South Georgia, the service and the interment were the subject of a BBC Radio 4 programme in the Crossing Continents series.

His grave is marked with a rough-hewn granite block with the inscription: "Frank Wild 1873–1939, Shackleton's right-hand man."

== Honours and memorials ==
Wild was awarded the CBE in the New Year Honours List of 1920, and in May 1923 he was made a Freeman of the City of London. He was also the recipient of a number of awards for his contributions to exploration and for advancing geography: He received the Royal Geographical Society's Back Award in 1916 and the Society's Patron's Medal in 1924.

Cape Wild and Point Wild on Elephant Island in the Antarctic are named after him, as is Mount Wild in the Queen Alexandra Range and Mount Wild in Graham Land. His CBE and four-bar Polar Medal sold for £132,000 in September 2009, more than double the estimate.

On 25 November 2011, the Government of South Georgia and South Sandwich Islands issued a set of commemorative postage stamps honouring Frank Wild along with other Antarctic pioneers. The set comprises eight stamps in four se-tenant pairs with denominations of 60, 70 and 90 pence, and £1.15. They are available from the Falkland Islands Philatelic Bureau.

In April 2012, BBC2 broadcast "Frank Wild: Antarctica's Forgotten Hero", presented by Paul Rose, which placed Wild's achievements alongside those of Shackleton and the other explorers of the Heroic Age. The documentary film also featured commentary from polar historian Dr. Huw Lewis-Jones, author Francis Spufford and explorer Sir Ranulph Fiennes. Of Wild, Paul Rose has said: "He was a true great. He stood shoulder to shoulder with Shackleton. They made the perfect team. With Shackleton’s great leadership skills, and Frank’s cool head and experience, they were able to handle almost anything that the Antarctic could throw at them."

On 29 September 2016, a statue of Wild was unveiled in his hometown of Skelton-in-Cleveland.

== Sources ==
- Bickel, Lennard (2001). Shackleton's Lost Men. London: Random House. ISBN 978-0-7126-6807-1.
- Lansing, Alfred (1959). Endurance, Shackleton's Incredible Voyage.
- Huw Lewis-Jones (2009). Face to Face: Polar Portraits. Conway and Polarworld, 288 pages. ISBN 978-1-84486-099-9.
- Leif Mills (1999). Frank Wild. Caedmon of Whitby, 350 pages.
- Angie Butler (2011). "The Quest for Frank Wild". Jackleberry Press, 214 pages.
- Huw Lewis-Jones and Kari Herbert (2011). In Search of the South Pole. Conway, 192 pages. ISBN 978-1-84486-137-8.
- Naidoo, Romaana (20 October 2011). "Wild's ashes found in Joburg". joburg.org.za. City of Johannesburg.
- Marr, James W. S. (30 September 1939). "Commander F. Wild, C.B.E." Nature. 144 (3648): 578–579. Bibcode:1939Natur.144..578M. doi:10.1038/144578b0.
- F.A. Worsley, Shackleton's Boat Journey
- Lusher, Adam (27 November 2011). "Forgotten hero Frank Wild of Antarctic exploration finally laid to rest, beside his 'boss' Sir Ernest Shackleton". The Daily Telegraph. Archived from the original on 28 November 2011.
