= Shackleton–Rowett Expedition =

1921–22 expedition to Antarctica

Expedition ship Quest, moored in St Katharine Docks, London

The Shackleton–Rowett Expedition (1921–22) was Sir Ernest Shackleton's last Antarctic project, and the final episode in the Heroic Age of Antarctic Exploration.

The venture, financed by John Quiller Rowett, is sometimes referred to as the Quest Expedition after its ship Quest, a converted Norwegian sealer. Shackleton had originally intended to go to the Arctic and explore the Beaufort Sea, but this plan was abandoned when the Canadian government withheld financial support; Shackleton thereupon switched his attention to the Antarctic. Quest, smaller than any recent Antarctic exploration vessel, soon proved inadequate for the task, and progress south was delayed by her poor sailing performance and frequent engine problems. Before the expedition's work could properly begin, Shackleton died on board the ship, just after arriving at the sub-Antarctic island of South Georgia.

The major part of the subsequent attenuated expedition was a three-month cruise to the eastern Antarctic, under the leadership of the party's second-in-command, Frank Wild. The shortcomings of Quest were soon in evidence: slow speed, heavy fuel consumption, a tendency to roll in heavy seas, and a steady leak. The ship was unable to proceed further than longitude 20°E, well short of their easterly target, and her engine's low power coupled with unsuitable bows was insufficient to penetrate southward through the pack ice. Following several fruitless attempts, Wild returned the ship to South Georgia, on the way visiting Elephant Island where he and 21 others had been stranded after the sinking of the ship Endurance, during Shackleton's Imperial Trans-Antarctic Expedition six years earlier.

Wild had thoughts of a second, more productive season in the ice, and took the ship to Cape Town for a refit. Here, in June 1922, he received a message from Rowett ordering the ship home to England, so the expedition ended quietly. The Quest voyage is not greatly regarded in the histories of polar exploration, due to the event that defines it in public memory, overshadowing its other activities: Shackleton's untimely death.

== Background ==
=== Shackleton after the Endurance ===
Shackleton returned to Britain from the Endurance expedition in late May 1917, while World War I was under way. Many of his men enlisted promptly upon their return. Too old to enlist, Shackleton nevertheless sought an active role in the war effort, and eventually departed for Murmansk with the temporary army rank of major, as part of the North Russia intervention. Shackleton expressed his dissatisfaction with this role in letters home: "I feel I am no use to anyone unless I am outfacing the storm in wild lands." He returned to England in February 1919 and began plans to set up a company that would, with the cooperation of the North Russian Government, develop the natural resources of the region. This scheme came to nothing, as the Red Army took control of that part of Russia during the Russian Civil War; to provide himself with an income, Shackleton had to rely on the lecture circuit. During the winter of 1919–20 he lectured twice a day, six days a week, for five months.

=== Canadian proposal ===
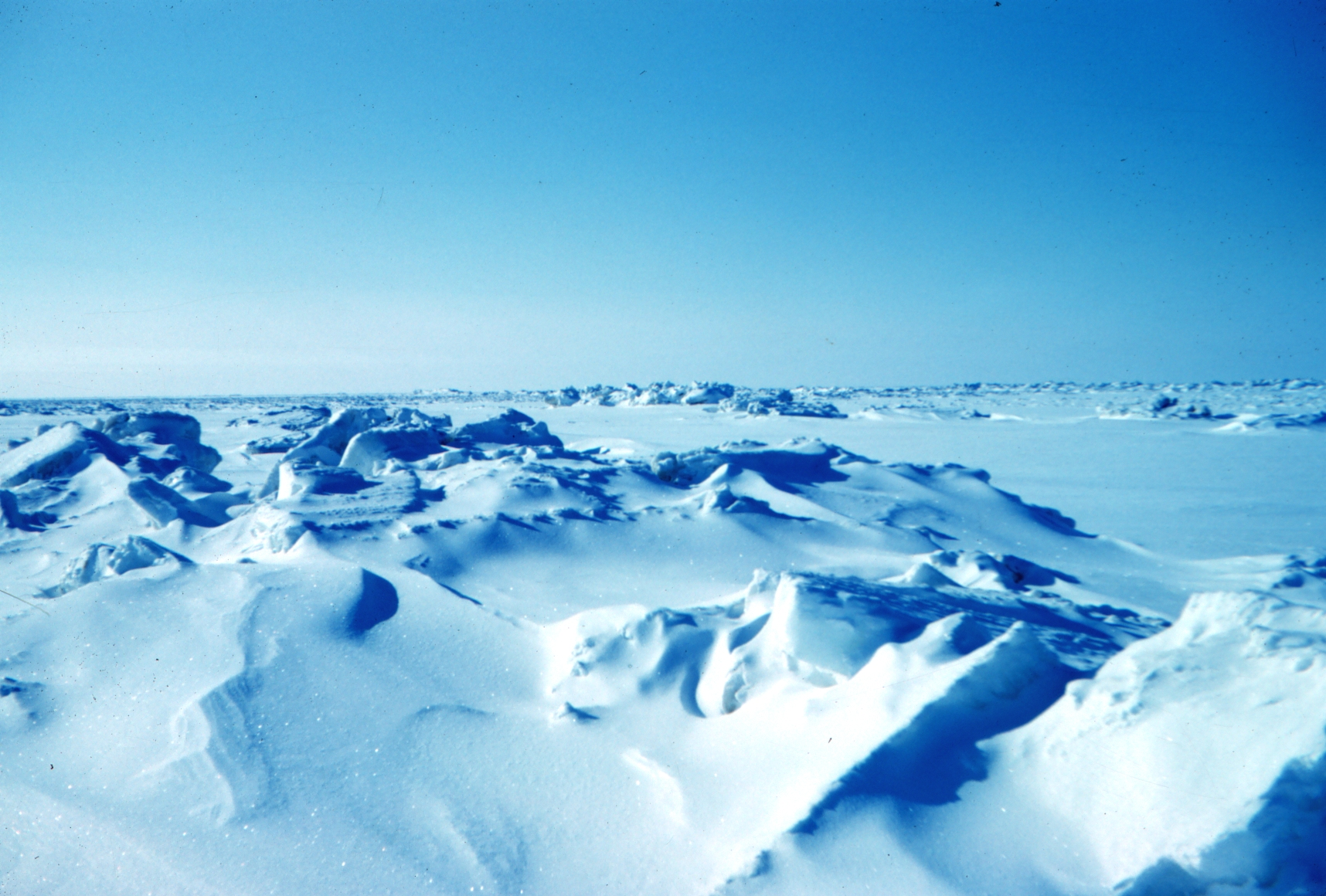
Dense pack ice in the Beaufort Sea

Despite the large debts still outstanding from the Endurance expedition, Shackleton's mind turned towards another exploration venture. He decided to turn away from the Antarctic, go northwards and, as he put it, "fill in this great blank now called the Beaufort Sea". This area of the Arctic Ocean, to the north of Alaska and west of the Canadian Arctic Archipelago, was largely unexplored; Shackleton believed, on the basis of tidal records, that it contained large undiscovered land masses that "would be of the greatest scientific interest to the world, apart from the possible economic value".

Shackleton also hoped to reach the northern pole of inaccessibility, the most remote point in the Arctic regions. In March 1920, his plans received the general approval of the Royal Geographical Society and were supported by the Canadian government. On this basis Shackleton set about acquiring the necessary funding, which he estimated at £50,000.

Later that year, Shackleton met by chance an old school-friend, John Quiller Rowett, who agreed to put up a nucleus of cash to get Shackleton started. With this money, in January 1921, Shackleton purchased the wooden Norwegian whaler Foca I together with other equipment, and began the process of hiring of a crew.

In May 1921, the policy of the Canadian government towards Arctic expeditions changed with the advent of a new prime minister, Arthur Meighen, who withdrew support from Shackleton's proposal. Shackleton was required to rethink his plans, and decided to sail for the Antarctic instead. A varied programme of exploration, coastal mapping, mineral prospecting and oceanographic research in the Southern Ocean would replace the abandoned Beaufort Sea venture.

== Antarctic preparation ==
=== Objectives ===
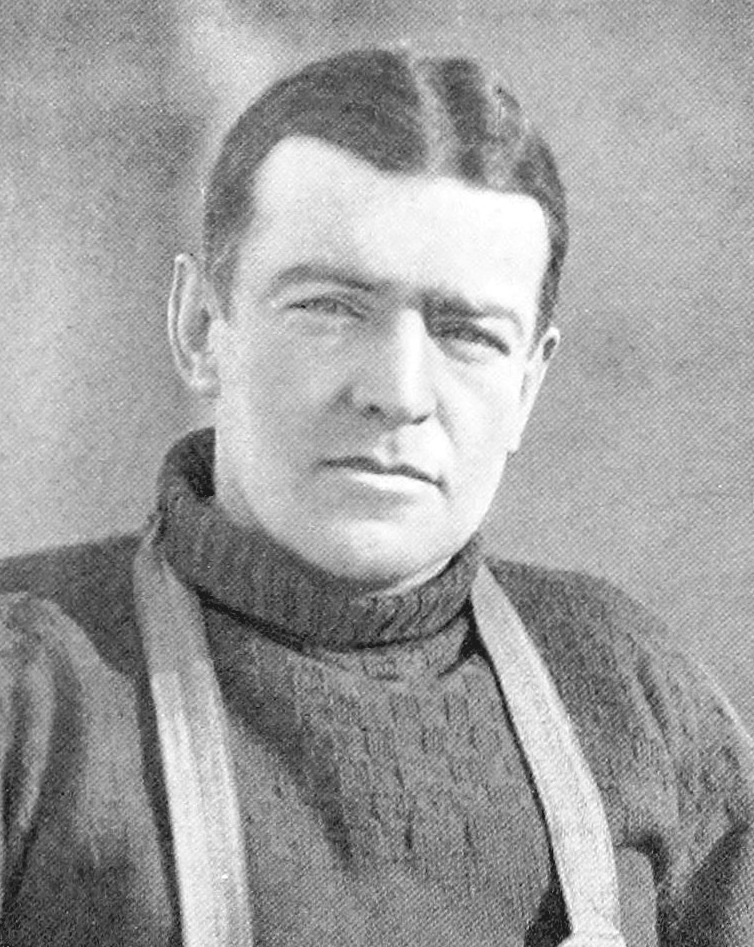
Sir Ernest Shackleton, the expedition's leader

Even before his problems with the Canadian government, Shackleton had been considering a southern expedition as a possible alternative to the Beaufort Sea. According to the RGS librarian Hugh Robert Mill, as early as March 1920 Shackleton had talked about two possible schemes – the Beaufort Sea exploration, and "an oceanographical expedition with the object of visiting all the little-known islands of the South Atlantic and South Pacific". By June 1921, the latter plan had expanded to include a circumnavigation of the Antarctic continent and the mapping of around 2,000 miles (3,200 km) of uncharted coastline. It would also encompass a search for "lost" or wrongly charted sub-Antarctic islands (including Dougherty Island, Tuanaki, and the Nimrod Islands), and would investigate possible mineral resources to be exploited in these rediscovered lands. A scientific research program would include a visit to Gough Island, and an investigation of a possible "underwater continental connection between Africa and America." Shackleton's biographer Margery Fisher calls the plan "diffuse", and "far too comprehensive for one small body of men to tackle within two years", while according to Roland Huntford, the expedition had no obvious goal and was "only too clearly a piece of improvisation, a pretext [for Shackleton] to get away".

Fisher describes the expedition as representing "the dividing line between what has become known as the Heroic Age of Antarctic exploration and the Mechanical Age". Shackleton called the voyage "pioneering", referring specifically to the aeroplane that was taken (but ultimately not used) on the expedition. In fact this was only one of the technological "firsts" that marked the venture; there were gadgets in profusion. The ship's crow's nest was electrically heated; there were heated overalls for the lookouts, a wireless set, and a device called an odograph which could trace and chart the ship's route automatically. Photography was to figure prominently, and "a large and expensive outfit of cameras, cinematographical machines and general photographic appliances [was] acquired". Among the oceanographical research equipment was a Lucas deep-sea sounding machine.

This ample provision arose from the sponsorship of Rowett, who had extended his original gift of seed money to an undertaking to cover the costs of the entire expedition. The extent of Rowett's contribution is not recorded; in an (undated) prospectus for the southern expedition Shackleton had estimated the total cost as "about £100,000". Whatever the total, Rowett appears to have funded the lion's share, enabling Frank Wild to record later that, unique among Antarctic expeditions of the era, this one returned home without any outstanding debt. According to Wild, without Rowett's actions the expedition would have been impossible: "His generous attitude is the more remarkable in that he knew there was no prospect of financial return, and what he did was in the interest of scientific research and from friendship with Shackleton." His only recognition was the attachment of his name to the title of the expedition. Rowett was, according to Huntford, "a stodgy, prosaic looking" businessman, who was, in 1920, a co-founder and principal contributor to an animal nutrition research institute in Aberdeen known as the Rowett Research Institute (now part of the University of Aberdeen). He had also endowed dental research work at the Middlesex Hospital.

=== Quest ===
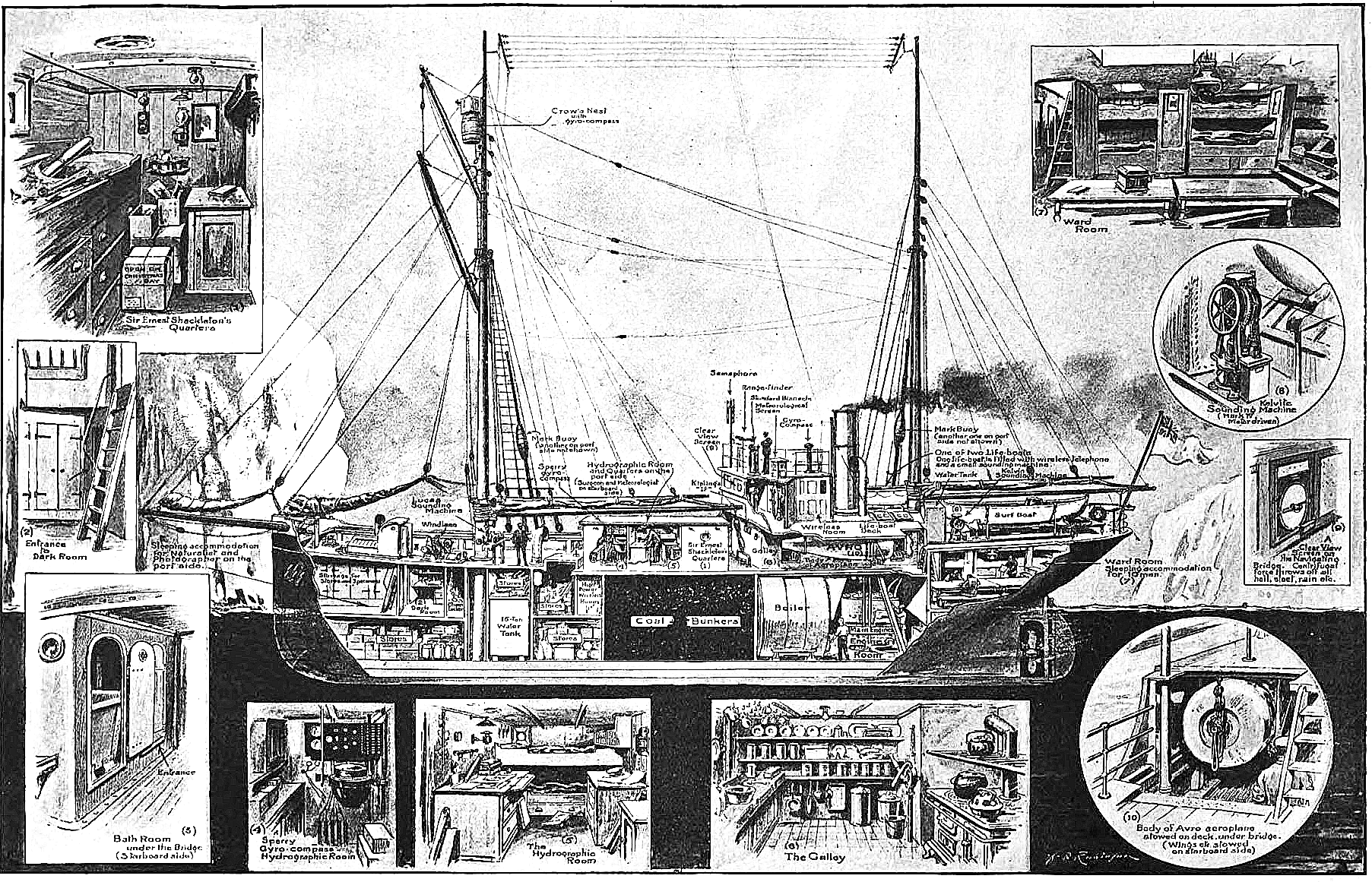
Cutaway of Quest after Shackleton's refit

In March 1921, Shackleton renamed his expedition vessel Quest. She was a small ship, 125 tons according to Huntford, with sail and auxiliary engine power purportedly capable of making eight knots, but in fact rarely making more than five-and-a-half. Huntford describes her as "straight-stemmed", with an awkward square rig, and a tendency to wallow in heavy seas. Fisher reports that she was built in 1917, weighed 204 tons, and had a large and spacious deck. Although she had some modern facilities, such as electric lights in the cabins, she was unsuited to long oceanic voyages; Shackleton, on the first day out, observed that "in no way are we shipshape or fitted to ignore even the mildest storm". Leif Mills, in his biography of Frank Wild, says that had the ship been taken to the Beaufort Sea in accordance with Shackleton's original plans, she would probably have been crushed in the Arctic pack ice. On her voyage south she suffered frequent damage and breakdowns, requiring repairs at every port of call.

=== Personnel ===
The Times had reported that Shackleton planned to take a dozen men to the Arctic, "chiefly those who had accompanied him on earlier expeditions". In fact, Quest left London for the south with 20 men, of whom eight were old Endurance comrades; another, James Dell, was a veteran from the Discovery, 20 years previously. Some of the Endurance hands had not been fully paid from the earlier expedition, but were prepared to join Shackleton again out of personal loyalty. Another Shackleton loyalist, Ernest Joyce, had fallen out with Shackleton over the money he claimed was owed to him, and was not invited to join the expedition.

Frank Wild, on his fourth trip with Shackleton, filled the second-in-command post as he had on the Endurance expedition. Frank Worsley, Endurance's former captain, became captain of Quest. Other old comrades included surgeons Alexander Macklin and James McIlroy, meteorologist Leonard Hussey, engineer Alexander Kerr, seaman Tom McLeod and cook Charles Green. Shackleton had assumed that Tom Crean would sign up, and had assigned him duties "in charge of boats", but Crean had retired from the navy to start a family back home in County Kerry, and declined Shackleton's invitation.

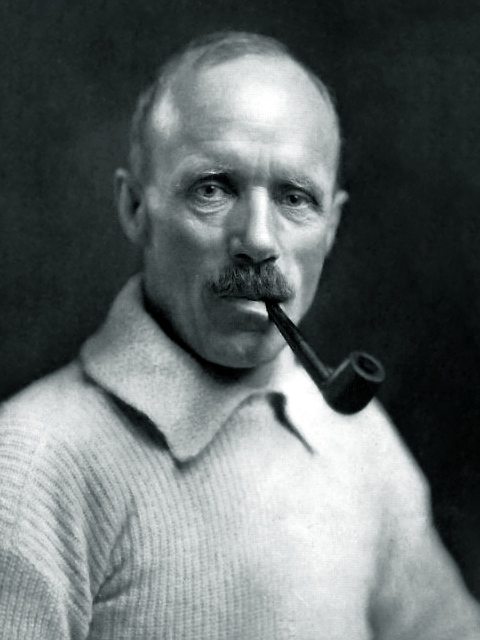
Frank Wild, second-in-command on the expedition

Of the newcomers, Roderick Carr, a New Zealand-born Royal Air Force pilot, was hired to fly the expedition's aeroplane, an Avro Baby modified as a seaplane with an 80-horsepower engine. He had met Shackleton in north Russia, and had recently been serving as chief of staff to the Lithuanian Air Force. Due to some missing parts, the aeroplane was not used during the expedition and Carr assisted with the general scientific work. Scientific staff included Australian biologist Hubert Wilkins, who had Arctic experience, and Canadian geologist Vibert Douglas, who had initially signed for the aborted Beaufort Sea expedition.

The recruits who caught the most public attention were two members of The Boy Scouts Association, Norman Mooney and James Marr. As the result of publicity organised by the Daily Mail newspaper, these two had been selected to join the expedition out of around 1,700 Scouts who had applied to go. Mooney, who was from the Orkney Islands, dropped out during the voyage south, leaving the ship at Madeira after suffering chronic seasickness. Marr, an 18-year-old from Aberdeen, remained throughout, winning plaudits from Shackleton and Wild for his application to the tasks at hand. After being put to work in the ship's coal bunkers, according to Wild, Marr "came out of the trial very well, showing an amount of hardihood and endurance that was remarkable".

== Expedition ==
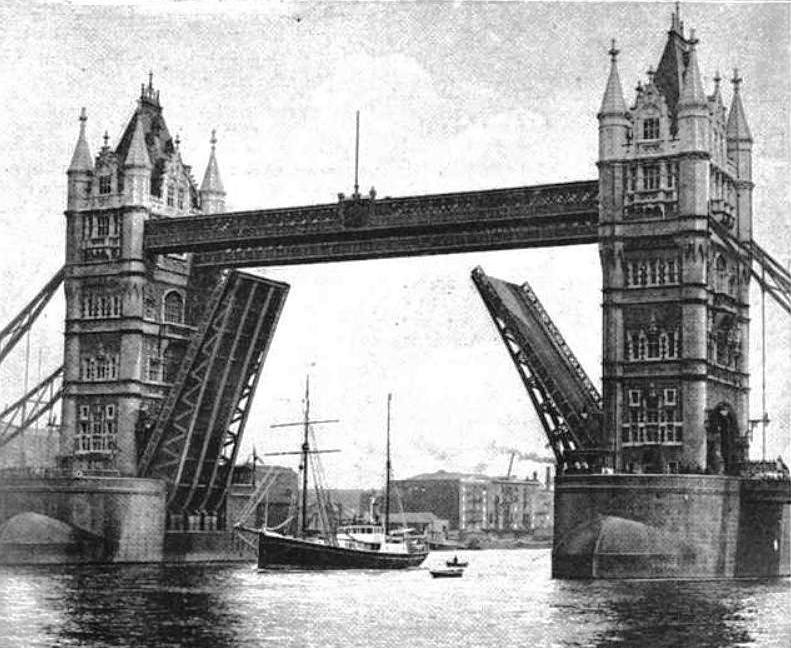
Quest passing through Tower Bridge, London

=== Voyage south ===
South Georgia, the expedition's first sub-Antarctic port of call. Grytviken Harbour is indicated on the northern shore.

Quest sailed from St Katharine Docks, London, on 17 September 1921, after inspection by King George V. Large crowds gathered on the banks of the river and on the bridges, to witness the event. Marr wrote in his diary that it was as though "all London had conspired together to bid us a heartening farewell".

Shackleton's original intention was to sail down to Cape Town, visiting the main South Atlantic islands on the way. From Cape Town, Quest would head for the Enderby Land coast of Antarctica where, once in the ice, it would explore the coastline towards Coats Land in the Weddell Sea. At the end of the summer season the ship would visit South Georgia before returning to Cape Town for refitting and preparation for the second year's work. The ship's performance in the early stages of the voyage disrupted this schedule. Serious problems with the engine necessitated a week's stay in Lisbon, and further stops in Madeira and the Cape Verde Islands. These delays and the slow speed of the ship led Shackleton to decide that it would be necessary to sacrifice entirely the visits to the South Atlantic islands, and instead he turned the ship towards Rio de Janeiro, where the engine could receive a thorough overhaul. Quest reached Rio on 22 November 1921.

The engine overhaul, and the replacement of a damaged topmast, delayed the party in Rio for four weeks. This meant that it was no longer practical to proceed to Cape Town and then on to the ice. Shackleton decided to sail directly to Grytviken harbour in South Georgia. Equipment and stores that had been sent on to Cape Town would have to be sacrificed, but Shackleton hoped that this shortfall could be made up in South Georgia. He was vague about the direction the expedition should take after South Georgia; Macklin wrote in his diary, "The Boss says...quite frankly that he does not know what he will do."

=== Death of Shackleton ===
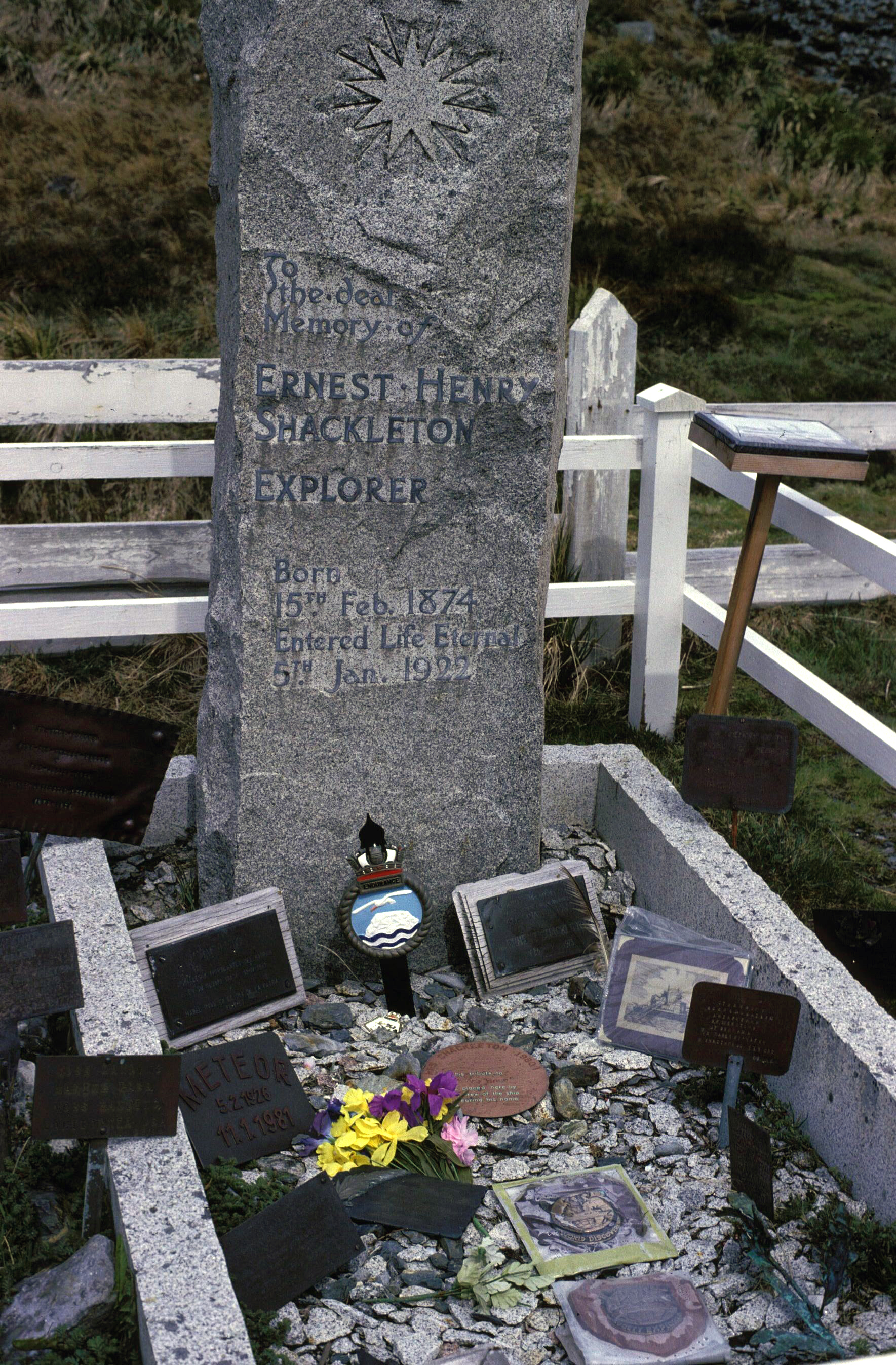
Shackleton's grave in Grytviken, South Georgia

On 17 December 1921, the day before Quest was due to leave Rio, Shackleton fell ill. He may have suffered a heart attack; Macklin was called, but Shackleton refused to be examined and declared himself "better" the next morning. On the ensuing voyage to South Georgia he was, from the accounts of his shipmates, unusually subdued and listless. He also began drinking champagne each morning, "to deaden the pain", contrary to his normal rule of not allowing liquor at sea.

A severe storm ruined the expedition's proposed Christmas celebrations, and a new problem with the engine's steam furnace slowed progress and caused Shackleton further stress. By 1 January 1922, the weather had abated: "Rest and calm after the storm – the year has begun kindly for us", wrote Shackleton in his diary.

On 4 January, South Georgia was sighted, and late that morning Quest anchored at Grytviken. After visiting the whaling establishment ashore, Shackleton returned to the ship apparently refreshed. He told Frank Wild that they would celebrate their deferred Christmas the next day, and retired to his cabin to write his diary. "The old smell of dead whale permeates everything", he wrote. "It is a strange and curious place ... A wonderful evening. In the darkening twilight I saw a lone star hover, gem like above the bay." Later he slept and was heard snoring by the surgeon McIlroy, who had just finished his watch-keeping duty.

Shortly after 02:00 on the morning of 5 January, Macklin, who had taken over the watch, was summoned to Shackleton's cabin. He found Shackleton complaining of back pains and severe facial neuralgia, and asking for a painkilling drug. In a brief discussion, Macklin told his leader that he had been overdoing things, and needed to lead a more regular life. Macklin records Shackleton as saying: "You're always wanting me to give up things, what is it I ought to give up?" Macklin replied, "Chiefly alcohol, Boss, I don't think it agrees with you." Immediately afterwards Shackleton "had a very severe paroxysm, during which he died".

The death certificate, signed by Macklin, gave the cause as "Atheroma of the Coronary arteries and Heart failure" – in modern terms, coronary thrombosis. Later that morning, Wild, now in command, gave the news to the shocked crew, and told them that the expedition would carry on. The body was taken ashore for embalming before its return to England. On 19 January, Leonard Hussey accompanied the body on board a steamer bound for Montevideo, but on arrival there he found a message from Emily Shackleton, requesting that the body be returned to South Georgia for burial.

Hussey took the body back to Grytviken, where Shackleton was buried on 5 March in the Norwegian cemetery. Quest had meantime sailed, so only Hussey of Shackleton's former comrades was present at the interment. A rough cross marked the burial site, until it was replaced by a tall granite column six years later.

=== Voyage to the ice ===
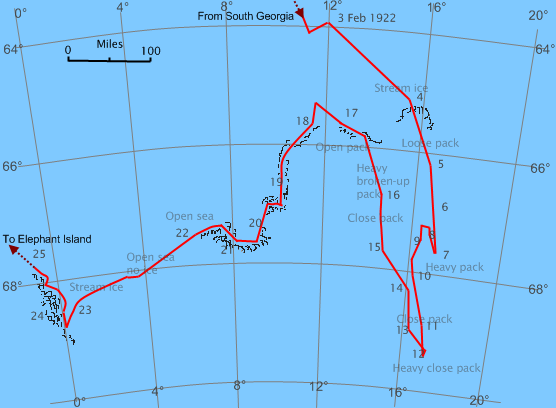
Quest's route from 3 to 24 February 1922 shows their repeated attempts to penetrate the pack ice

As leader, Wild had to arrange where the expedition should now go. Kerr reported that a longstanding problem with the ship's furnace was manageable and, after supplementing stores and equipment, Wild decided to proceed generally in accordance with Shackleton's original intentions. He would take the ship eastward towards Bouvet Island and then beyond, before turning south to enter the ice as close as possible to Enderby Land, and begin coastal survey work there. The expedition would also investigate an appearance of land in the mouth of the Weddell Sea, reported by James Clark Ross in 1842, but not seen since. Ultimately, progress would depend on weather, ice conditions, and the capabilities of the ship.

Quest left South Georgia on 18 January, heading south-east towards the South Sandwich Islands. There was a heavy swell, such that the overladen ship frequently dipped her gunwales below the waves, filling the waist with water. As they proceeded, Wild wrote that Quest rolled like a log, leaked and required regular pumping, was heavy on coal consumption, and was slow. All these factors led him to change his plan at the end of January. Bouvet Island was abandoned in favour of a more southerly course that brought them to the edge of the pack ice on 4 February.

"Now the little Quest can really try her mettle", wrote Wild, as the ship entered the loose pack. He noted that Quest was the smallest ship ever to attempt to penetrate the heavy Antarctic ice, and pondered on the fate of others. "Shall we escape, or will the Quest join the ships in Davy Jones's Locker?" During the days that followed, as they moved southward in falling temperatures, the ice thickened. On 12 February, they reached the most southerly latitude they would attain, 69°17'S, and their most easterly longitude, 17°9'E, well short of Enderby Land. Noting the state of the sea ice and fearing being frozen in, Wild retreated to the north and west.

He still hoped to tackle the heavy ice, and if possible, break through to the hidden land beyond. On 18 February, he turned the ship south again for another try, but was no more successful than before. On 24 February, after a series of further efforts had failed, Wild set a course westward across the mouth of the Weddell Sea towards Elephant Island, where Wild and 21 others had been stranded during Shackleton's Imperial Trans-Antarctic Expedition six years earlier. They would then return to South Georgia before the onset of winter.

For the most part, the long passage across the Weddell Sea proceeded uneventfully. There was a growing level of unrest among the crew, perhaps provoked by disappointment with the apparent aimlessness of the voyage; Worsley in particular was critical of Wild's leadership. Wild, in his own account, dealt with this discontent by the threat of "the most drastic treatment". On 12 March, they reached 64°11'S, 46°4'W, which was the area where Ross had recorded an appearance of land in 1842, but there was no sign of it, and a depth sounding of over 2,300 fathoms (13,800 ft; 4,200 m) indicated no likelihood of land nearby. From 15 to 21 March, Quest was frozen into the ice, and the shortage of coal became a major concern. Wild hoped that the diminished fuel supply could be supplemented by blubber from the seals at Elephant Island.

On 25 March, the island was sighted. Wild wanted if possible to revisit Cape Wild, the site of the old Endurance expedition camp, but bad weather prevented this. They viewed the site through binoculars, picking out the old landmarks, before landing on the western coast to hunt for elephant seals. They were able to obtain sufficient blubber to mix with the coal so that, aided by a favourable wind, they reached South Georgia on 6 April.

=== Return ===
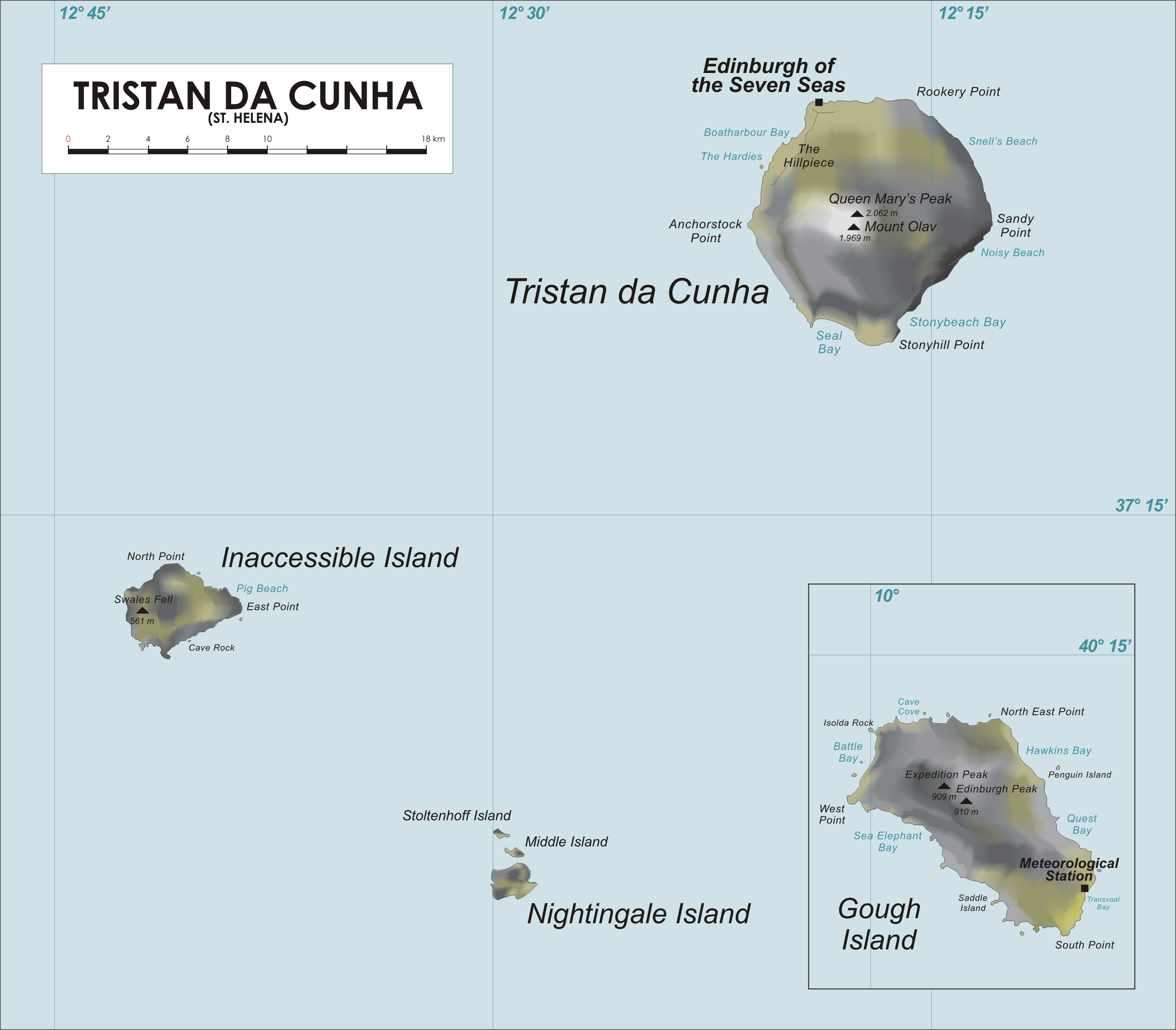
Tristan da Cunha, Inaccessible Island, and Gough Island

Quest remained in South Georgia for a month, during which time Shackleton's old comrades erected a memorial cairn to their former leader, on a headland overlooking the entrance to Grytviken harbour. On 8 May 1922, Quest sailed for Cape Town, where Wild hoped to arrange a refit in preparation for a more productive second season in the ice. The first port of call was Tristan da Cunha, a remote inhabited island to the west and south of Cape Town. After a rough crossing of the "Roaring Forties", Quest arrived there on 20 May. Following orders from Robert Baden-Powell, Marr presented a flag to the local Scout Troop.

During the five-day stay, with the help of some of the islanders, the expedition made brief landings on the small Inaccessible Island, 20 miles (32 km) south-west of Tristan, and visited the even smaller Nightingale Island, collecting specimens. Wild's impressions of the stay at Tristan were not altogether favourable. He noted the appalling squalor and poverty, and said of the population: "They are ignorant, shut off almost completely from the world, horribly limited in outlook."

After the Scout parade and flag presentation, Quest sailed on to Gough Island, 200 miles (320 km) to the east, where members of the expedition took geological and botanical samples. They arrived at Cape Town on 18 June, to be greeted by enthusiastic crowds. South African Prime Minister Jan Smuts gave an official reception, and they were honoured at dinners and lunches by local organisations.

They were also met by Rowett's agent, with the message that they should return to England. Wild wrote: "I should have liked one more season in the Enderby Quadrant ... much might be accomplished by making Cape Town our starting point and setting out early in the season." On 19 July, they left Cape Town and sailed north. Their final visits were to Saint Helena, Ascension Island and São Vicente. On 16 September, one year after departure, they arrived at Plymouth harbour.

== Aftermath ==
=== Assessment ===
According to Wild, the expedition ended quietly, although his biographer Leif Mills writes of enthusiastic crowds in Plymouth Sound. At the end of his account, Wild expressed the hope that the information they had brought back might "prove of value in helping to solve the great natural problems that still beset us".

These results were summarised in five brief appendices to Wild's book. The summaries reflected the efforts of the scientific staff to collect data and specimens at each port of call, and the geological and survey work carried out by Carr and Douglas on South Georgia, before the southern voyage. Eventually a few scientific papers and articles were developed from this material, but it was, in Leif Mills's words, "little enough to show for a year's work".

The lack of a clear, defined expedition objective was aggravated by the failure to call at Cape Town on the way south, which meant that important equipment was not picked up. On South Georgia, Wild found little that could make up for this loss – there were no dogs on the island, so no sledging work could be carried out, which eliminated Wild's preferred choice of a revised expedition goal, an exploration of Graham Land on the Antarctic Peninsula.

The death of Shackleton before the beginning of serious work was a heavy blow, and questions were raised about the adequacy of Wild as his replacement. Some reports imply that Wild drank heavily – "practically an alcoholic", according to Huntford. Mills suggests that even if Shackleton had lived to complete the expedition, it is arguable whether under the circumstances it could have achieved more than it did under Wild's command.

The non-use of the aeroplane was a disappointment; Shackleton had hoped to pioneer the use of air transport in Antarctic waters, and had discussed this issue with the British Air Ministry. According to Fisher's account, essential aeroplane parts had been sent on to Cape Town, but remained uncollected. The long-range, 220-volt wireless equipment did not work properly, and was abandoned early on. The smaller, 110-volt equipment worked only within a range of 250 miles (400 km). During the Tristan visit, Wild attempted to install a new wireless apparatus with the help of a local missionary, but this was also unsuccessful.

=== End of an era ===
An Antarctic hiatus followed the return of Quest, with no significant expeditions to the region for seven years. The expeditions that then followed were of a different character from their predecessors, belonging to the "mechanical age" that succeeded the Heroic Age.

At the end of his narrative of the Quest expedition, Wild wrote of the Antarctic: "I think that my work there is done"; he never returned, closing a career which, like Shackleton's, had bracketed the entire Heroic Age. In 1923, he emigrated to the Union of South Africa, where, after a series of business failures and dogged by ill health, he was employed in a succession of low-paid jobs.

In March 1939, British authorities awarded him an annual pension of £170; Wild commented: "I don't want to grumble, but I think it might have been made big enough for the poor old hero and his wife to live on". Wild died on 19 August 1939, aged 66. The cause of death recorded was pneumonia and diabetes mellitus.

None of the other Endurance veterans returned to the Antarctic, although Worsley made one voyage to the Arctic in 1925. Of the other crew and staff of Quest, Australian naturalist Hubert Wilkins became a pioneer aviator in both the Arctic and Antarctic, and flew from Point Barrow, Alaska, to Spitsbergen in 1928. He also made several unsuccessful attempts during the 1930s, in collaboration with American adventurer Lincoln Ellsworth, to fly to the South Pole. James Marr also became an Antarctic regular after qualifying as a marine biologist, and joined several Australian expeditions in the late 1920s and 1930s. Roderick Carr became an Air Marshal in the Royal Air Force and deputy chief of staff to the Supreme Headquarters Allied Expeditionary Force in 1945.

== Sources ==
- Fisher, Margery and James (1957). Shackleton. London: James Barrie Books.
- Harrington, John Walker (July 3, 1921). "Shackleton's Search for Antarctic Islands of Doubt". The New York Times. p. 68.
- Huntford, Roland (1985). Shackleton. London: Hodder & Stoughton. ISBN 0-340-25007-0.
- Huntford, Roland (intro.) (2002). The Shackleton Voyages. London: Weidenfeld & Nicolson. ISBN 0-297-84360-5.
- Mills, Leif (1999). Frank Wild. Whitby: Caedmon of Whitby. ISBN 0-905355-48-2.
- Riffenburgh, Beau (2006). Encyclopedia of the Antarctic. Routledge. ISBN 978-0-415-97024-2.
- Shackleton, Ernest. "Diary of the Quest Expedition 1921–22". Cambridge: Scott Polar Research Institute.
- Smith, Michael (2000). An Unsung Hero: Tom Crean – Antarctic Survivor. London: Headline Book Publishing. ISBN 0-7472-5357-9.
- Tyler-Lewis, Kelly (2006). The Lost Men. London: Bloomsbury Publications. ISBN 978-0-7475-7972-4.
- Verdon-Roe, Alliott (1938). The World of Wings and Things. London: Hurst & Blackett.
- Wild, Frank. "Shackleton's last voyage: The Story of the Quest".
- Wild, Frank (February 1923). "The Voyage of the "Quest"". The Geographical Journal. 61 (2): 74. Bibcode:1923GeogJ..61...73W. doi:10.2307/1781104. JSTOR 1781104.
- "History". Rowett Institute of Nutrition and Health, University of Aberdeen.
- "An Antarctic Time Line 1519–1959". South-pole.com.
- "Measuring Worth". Institute for the Measurement of Worth.
- "Shackleton-Rowett Expedition 50th anniversary, Tristan da Cunha". Scouts on Stamps Society International.

=== Further reading ===
- Smith, George A. (October 1923). "XLI.— Report on the Echinoderms collected during the voyage of the 'Quest' (1921–22)". Annals and Magazine of Natural History. 12 (70): 367–376. doi:10.1080/00222932308632958.
