= Suzerainty =

Rights and obligations of a dominant state

A suzerain (/ˈsuːzərən, -reɪn/, from Old French sus 'above' + soverain 'supreme, chief') is a person, state or polity who has supremacy and dominant influence over the foreign policy and economic relations of another subordinate party or polity, but allows internal autonomy to that subordinate. Where the subordinate polity is called a vassal, vassal state or tributary state, the dominant party is called the suzerain. The rights and obligations of a vassal are called vassalage, and the rights and obligations of a suzerain are called suzerainty.

Suzerainty differs from sovereignty in that the dominant power does not exercise centralized governance over the vassals, allowing tributary states to be technically self-ruling but enjoy only limited independence. Although the situation has existed in a number of historical empires, it is considered difficult to reconcile with 20th- or 21st-century concepts of international law, in which sovereignty is a binary concept, which either exists or does not. While a sovereign state can agree by treaty to become a protectorate of a stronger power, modern international law does not recognise any way of making this relationship compulsory on the weaker power. Suzerainty is a practical, de facto situation, rather than a legal, de jure one.

== China ==
In early Ancient China, the various self-ruling regional polities (some being merely tribal city-states) often align under the sphere of influence of a confederacy, of which the largest, most powerful state typically became the de jure dynastic leader. During the era of the mythical Three Sovereigns and Five Emperors dynastic and the subsequent theocratic Xia and Shang dynasties, such a suzerain state would assume the "divine blessings" of Mandate of Heaven and became known as an overlord (Chinese: 共主; pinyin: gòng zhǔ; lit. 'universal lord'), who claimed superiority over numerous submitted but autonomous states known as fangguo (方國 lit. 'regional/local state'). During the Zhou dynasty, most of the states were not indigenously established, but rather were aristocrat polities appointed by the ruling Ji royal family via enfeoffment (册封 cè fēng lit. 'decreed investiture') to extended relatives and loyal allies who contributed to the overthrow of the Shang dynasty. Although China then was largely a federacy where the ruling Zhou kings only had limited sovereignty over the affairs of their vassal states, the term "Son of Heaven" (天子 tiān zǐ) has since become the title of all Chinese sovereigns of the subsequent dynasties until the Xinhai Revolution in 1912, with Classic of Poetry even claiming the king's suzerainty over all lands under Heaven:

普天之下，莫非王土。率土之賓，莫非王臣。
"Under the sky, nothing isn't the king's land; the people who lead the lands, no one isn't the king's subjects."

The unification of China under the Qin dynasty in 221 BC started the two millennia-long Imperial era of Chinese history, and the Emperor became the supreme leader of a unitary China. Although the Qin dynasty was short-lived and fell to remnant rebels of the states it once conquered soon after the death of the First Emperor, the subsequent Han dynasty (whose founding emperor Liu Bang and chancellors Xiao He and Cao Shen were all former civil servants of the Qin bureaucracy) inherited Qin's concept of Chinese uniformity and, through diplomatic power projections and trade routes such as the Silk Road and Tea Horse Road, became a prosperous empire with international influence far beyond the boundaries of China proper. The prominence of the Han empire, especially after defeating the Xiongnu Empire, Dayuan and Wiman Gojoseon, had led to fealty and tributes from numerous states in the surrounding Central Asia (then known as the Western Regions), Northeast Asia (mainly Buyeo and the Jin Koreans) and Southeast Asia (pre-Jiande Nanyue and early Funan), to whom the Chinese emperors granted titles of kingship, as evidenced by King of Na gold seal of Yayoi period Japan (then known as Wa) and the similar gold seal of Dian. Similarly, the dominance of the early Tang dynasty, especially after its annihilation of the Eastern Turkic Khaganate in 630 AD and Xueyantuo in 646 AD, earned Emperor Taizong the nickname of Khan of Heaven (天可汗 tiān kěhán) by various Göktürk nomads of Inner Asia subdued during his reign.

The tributary or Chaogong (朝貢) system under the Chinese sphere of influence (particularly within the Sinosphere) was a loose network of international and trade relations focused on China's prestige as the undisputed regional power in East Asia, and other states in the surrounding Central, Northeast, Southeast and South Asian regions also facilitated their trade and foreign relations by acknowledging China's primacy role in the Far East. It involved multiple relationships of trade, military force, diplomacy and ritual. The other states had to send a tributary envoy to China on schedule, who would kowtow to the Chinese emperors as a form of submission and acknowledgement of Chinese supremacy and precedence, and the Chinese emperors often granted gifts, wealth, blessings and favorable policy promises in return. The other countries followed China's formal ritual in order to keep the peace with the more powerful neighbor and be eligible for diplomatic or military help under certain conditions. Political actors within the tributary system were largely autonomous and in almost all cases virtually independent.

The term "tribute system" as applied to China is a 20th-century Western invention. There was no equivalent term in the Chinese lexicon to describe what would be considered the "tribute system" today, nor was it envisioned as an institution or system. John King Fairbank and Teng Ssu-yu created the "tribute system" theory in a series of articles in the early 1940s to describe "a set of ideas and practices developed and perpetuated by the rulers of China over many centuries." The Fairbank model presents the tribute system as an extension of the hierarchic and nonegalitarian Confucian social order. The more Confucian the actors, the more likely they were to participate in the tributary system.

In practice the behaviors which were collectively seen as a tributary system, involving tribute and gift exchange in return for symbolic subordination, were only formalized during the early years of the Ming dynasty due to Zheng He's treasure voyages. Tributary members were virtually autonomous and carried out their own agendas despite paying tribute; this was the case with Japan, Korea, Ryukyu, and Vietnam. Chinese influence on tributary states was almost always non-interventionist in nature and tributary states "normally could expect no military assistance from Chinese armies should they be invaded".

The Chinese tributary system was upended in the 19th and 20th centuries as a result of spreading Western colonialism and the rise of Imperial Japan after the Meiji Restoration. Previously, the Portuguese conquest of Malacca and settlement of Macau, the Spanish colonization of the Philippines and the Dutch incursions to the Malay Archipelago had already eroded the Chinese prestige in the Nanyang region (roughly present-day Southeast Asia as well as New Guinea). During the late Qing dynasty, the Chinese tributary system was gradually destroyed with Britain annexing Hong Kong, Lower and Upper Burma following the Opium Wars and Anglo-Burmese Wars; the France conquering Cambodia, Laos and Vietnam into Indochina, and Japan annexing Ryukyu Islands, Taiwan and Korea after the Ryukyu Disposition and First Sino-Japanese War. The downward spiral of the Qing dynasty over the second half of the 19th century also caused mainland China to become semi-colonized, with many of its coastal regions turning into foreign concessions that lasted through the First and Second World Wars. Most of the foreign colonies were returned to Chinese control before the founding of the People's Republic of China in 1949, with the last three concession territories being returned in by the Soviets in 1952, by the British in 1997 and by the Portuguese in 1999.

Since colonial times, Britain had regarded Tibet as being under Chinese suzerainty, but in 2008 the British Foreign Secretary David Miliband called that word an "anachronism" in a statement, and recognized Tibet as sovereign part of China.

== Ancient Israel and Near East ==
Suzerainty treaties and similar covenants and agreements between Middle Eastern states were quite prevalent during the pre-monarchic and monarchy periods in Ancient Israel. The Hittites, Egyptians, and Assyrians had been suzerains to the Israelites and other tribal kingdoms of the Levant from 1200 to 600 BC. The structure of Jewish covenant law was similar to the Hittite form of suzerain.

Each treaty would typically begin with an "Identification" of the Suzerain, followed by an historical prologue cataloguing the relationship between the two groups "with emphasis on the benevolent actions of the suzerain towards the vassal". Following the historical prologue came the stipulation. This included tributes, obligations and other forms of subordination that would be imposed on the Israelites. According to the Hittite form, after the stipulations were offered to the vassal, it was necessary to include a request to have copies of the treaty that would be read throughout the kingdom periodically. The treaty would have divine and earthly witnesses purporting the treaty's validity, trustworthiness, and efficacy. This also tied into the blessings that would come from following the treaty and the curses from breaching it. For disobedience, curses would be given to those who had not remained steadfast in carrying out the stipulations of the treaty.

=== Hittite suzerainty treaty form ===
Below is a form of a Hittite suzerainty treaty.

- Preamble: Identifies the parties involved in the treaty, the author, the title of the sovereign party, and usually his genealogy. It usually emphasises the greatness of the king or dominant party.
- Prologue: Lists the deeds already performed by the Suzerain on behalf of the vassal. This section would outline the previous relationship the two groups had up until that point with historical detail and facts that are very beneficial to scholars today, such as scholar George Mendenhall who focuses on this type of covenant as it pertained to the Israelite traditions. The suzerain would document previous events in which they did a favor that benefitted the vassal. The purpose of this would show that the more powerful group was merciful and giving, therefore, the vassal should obey the stipulations that are presented in the treaty. It discusses the relationship between them as a personal relationship instead of a solely political one. Most importantly in this section, the vassal is agreeing to future obedience for the benefits that he received in the past without deserving them.
- Stipulations: Terms to be upheld by the vassal for the life of the treaty; defines how the vassal is obligated and gives more of the legalities associated with the covenant.
- Provision for annual public reading: A copy of the treaty was to be read aloud annually in the vassal state for the purpose of renewal and to inform the public of the expectations involved and increase respect for the sovereign party, usually the king.
- Divine witness to the treaty: These usually include the deities of both the Suzerain and the vassal, but put special emphasis on the deities of the vassal.
- Blessings if the stipulations of the treaty were upheld and curses if the stipulations were not upheld. These blessings and curses were generally seen to come from the gods instead of punishment by the dominant party for example.
- Sacrificial meal: Both parties would share a meal to show their participation in the treaty.

== India ==
=== British paramountcy ===
The British East India Company conquered Bengal in 1757, and gradually extended its control over the whole of India. It annexed many of the erstwhile Indian kingdoms ("states", in British terminology) but entered into alliances with others. Some states were created by the East India Company itself through the grant of jagirs to influential allies. The states varied enormously in size and influence, with Hyderabad at the upper end with 16.5 million people and an annual revenue of 100 million rupees and states like Bilbari at the lower end with a population of 27 people and annual revenue of 80 rupees.

The principle of paramountcy was explicitly stated in a letter by Lord Reading to the Nizam of Hyderabad, Mir Osman Ali Khan, in 1926, "The sovereignty of the British Crown is supreme in India and therefore no ruler of an Indian State can justifiably claim to negotiate with the British Government on an equal footing." This meant that the Indian states were crown dependencies or protectorates of the British Indian government. They could not make war or have any direct dealings with foreign states. Neither did they enjoy full internal autonomy. The British government could and did interfere in their internal affairs if the imperial interests were involved or if it proved necessary in the interest of so-stated "good governance". In some cases, the British government also deposed these Indian princes.

According to historians Sugata Bose and Ayesha Jalal the system of paramountcy was a system of limited sovereignty only in appearance. In reality, it was a system of recruitment of a reliable base of support for the imperial state. The support of the Imperial State obviated the need for the rulers to seek legitimacy through patronage and dialogue with their populations. Through their direct as well as indirect rule through the princes, the colonial state turned the population of India into 'subjects' rather than citizens.

The Government of India Act 1935 envisaged that India would be a federation of autonomous provinces balanced by Indian princely states. This plan never came to fruition. The political conditions were oppressive in several princely states giving rise to political movements. Under pressure from Mahatma Gandhi, the Indian National Congress resolved not to interfere directly but called on the princes to increase civil liberties and reduce their own privileges.

With the impending independence of India in 1947, the Governor-General Lord Mountbatten announced that the British paramountcy over Indian states would come to an end. The states were advised to accede to one of the new dominions, India or Pakistan. An Instrument of Accession was devised for this purpose. The Congress leaders agreed to the plan on the condition that Mountbatten ensure that the majority of the states within the Indian territory accede to India. Under pressure from the governor-general, all the Indian states acceded to India save two, Junagadh and Hyderabad.

=== Sikkim ===
Following the independence of India in 1947, a treaty signed between the Chogyal of Sikkim, Palden Thondup Namgyal, and the Prime Minister of India, Jawaharlal Nehru gave India suzerainty over Kingdom of Sikkim in exchange for it retaining its independence. This continued until 1975, when the Sikkimese monarchy was abolished in favor of a merger into India. Sikkim is now one of the states of India.

=== Lakshadweep (Laccadives) ===
Located in the Arabian Sea, Lakshadweep is a Union territory of India off the coast of the southwestern state of Kerala. The Aminidivi group of islands (Amini, Kadmat, Kiltan, Chetlat and Bitra) came under the rule of Tipu Sultan in 1787. They passed on to British control after the Third Anglo-Mysore War and were attached to the South Canara district. The rest of the islands became a suzerainty of the Arakkal Kingdom of Cannanore in return for a payment of annual tribute.

After a while, the British took over the administration of those islands for non-payment of arrears. These islands were attached to the Malabar district of the Madras Presidency. In 1956, the States Reorganisation Act separated these islands from the mainland administrative units, forming a new union territory by combining all the islands.

== Pakistan ==
The princely states of the British Raj which acceded to Pakistan maintained their sovereignty with the Government of Pakistan acting as the suzerain until 1956 for Bahawalpur, Khairpur, and the Balochistan States, 1969 for Chitral and the Frontier States, and 1974 for Hunza and Nagar. All these territories have since been merged into Pakistan.

== South African Republic ==
After the First Boer War (1880–81), the South African Republic was granted its independence, albeit under British suzerainty. During the Second Boer War (1899–1902), the South African Republic was annexed as the Transvaal Colony, which existed until 1910, when it became the Province of Transvaal in the Union of South Africa.

== German Empire ==
Following the Treaty of Brest-Litovsk (1918), the German Empire received a very short-lived suzerainty over the Baltic countries of Estonia, Latvia, and Lithuania. New monarchies were created in Lithuania and the United Baltic Duchy (which comprised the modern countries of Latvia and Estonia). The German aristocrats Wilhelm Karl, Duke of Urach (in Lithuania), and Adolf Friedrich, Duke of Mecklenburg-Schwerin (in the United Baltic Duchy), were appointed as rulers. This plan was detailed by German Colonel General Erich Ludendorff, who wrote, "German prestige demands that we should hold a strong protecting hand, not only over German citizens, but over all Germans."

== Historical suzerainties ==
=== Ottoman Empire ===
- Principality of Serbia
- Principality of Samos
- Cretan State
- Crimean Khanate
- Septinsular Republic
- Principality of Bulgaria
- Principality of Moldavia
- Republic of Ragusa
- Principality of Romania
- Serbian Despotate
- Principality of Transylvania
- Principality of Upper Hungary
- Principality of Wallachia
- Khedivate of Egypt
- Vilayet of Tripolitania
- Eyalet of Tunis
- Regency of Algiers
- Emirate of Mount Lebanon

=== Duchy of Prussia / Kingdom of Prussia / North German Confederation / German Empire ===
- Electorate of Brandenburg (Brandenburg-Prussia)
- Principality of Neuchâtel
- County of Stolberg-Wernigerode
  - County of Stolberg-Schwarza (after 1748)
  - County of Stolberg-Gedern (after 1804)
- Grand Duchy of Posen
- Duchy of Saxe-Lauenburg
- Grand Duchy of Baden (Franco-Prussian War)
- Kingdom of Bavaria (Franco-Prussian War)
- Kingdom of Württemberg (Franco-Prussian War)
- Grand Duchy of Hesse and by Rhine (Franco-Prussian War)
- Duchy of Courland and Semigallia
- United Baltic Duchy
  - Duchy of Courland and Semigallia
  - Duchy of Estonia and Livonia
- Kingdom of Lithuania
- Kingdom of Poland
- Belarusian Democratic Republic
- Ukrainian People's Republic (Treaty of Brest-Litovsk)
- Ukrainian State
- Crimean Regional Government
- Don Republic
- Kuban People's Republic
- Mountainous Republic of the Northern Caucasus
- Transcaucasian Democratic Federative Republic (Otto von Lossow mission)
- Democratic Republic of Georgia (Treaty of Poti)

=== Qing dynasty ===
- Mongolia
- Tibet
- Korea
- Vietnam
- Myanmar
- Thailand

=== Empire of Japan ===
- Ryukyu Kingdom
- Korean Empire

=== In Europe ===
- Habsburg control, as Holy Roman Emperor, over Liechtenstein (1719–1918), previously Schellenberg (1499–1719) and County of Vaduz (1322–1719)
- Ireland, under the control of the High King of Ireland.
- Piombino (Kingdom of the Two Sicilies)

=== In Indonesia ===
- Kingdom of Larantuka

=== In Africa ===
- Orange Free State, under British control (1854–1902).
- South African Republic

== See also ==
- Associated state
- Client state
- Feudalism
- Finlandization
- Hegemony
- Imperator totius Hispaniae
- Imperialism
- Mandala (Southeast Asian history)
- Non-sovereign monarchy
- Overking
- Puppet state
- Satellite state
- Satrap
- Sadae
- Special Administrative Region
- Tributary state
- Tributary system of China
- Vassal state
- Westphalian sovereignty
