= Elikalpeni Bank =

- Location within India

Geography
- Location: Arabian Sea
- Coordinates: 11.20°N 73.96°E
- Type: Submerged bank
- Archipelago: Lakshadweep
- Adjacent to: Indian Ocean
- Total islands: 0
- Area: 0 km^{2} (0 sq mi)
- Highest elevation: −10.4 m (-34.1 ft)

Administration
- India
- Territory: Union territory of Lakshadweep
- District: Lakshadweep
- Island group: Aminidivi
- Tehsils of India: Aminidivi
- Subdivisions of India: Amini Island

Demographics
- Population: 0 (2014)
- Pop. density: 0/km^{2} (0/sq mi)
- Ethnic groups: Malayali, Mahls

Additional information
- Time zone: IST (UTC+5:30)
- ISO code: IN-LD-00
- Official website: www.lakshadweep.gov.in
- Avg. summer temperature: 32.0 °C (89.6 °F)
- Avg. winter temperature: 28.0 °C (82.4 °F)

Elikalpeni Bank is a submerged bank or sunken atoll belonging to the Amindivi Subgroup of islands of the Union Territory of Lakshadweep, India.

== Geography ==
Elikalpeni Bank has a minimum depth of 10.4 m and is located 57 km northeast of Androth at 11°12′N 73°58′E.

Elikalpeni Bank is the easternmost geographic feature of the Lakshadweep Archipelago, although other little researched banks with depths of as little as 18.3 m lie about 32 km east of Elikalpeni. It has a lagoon area of 95.91 km^{2} (37.03 sq mi).

== Image gallery ==
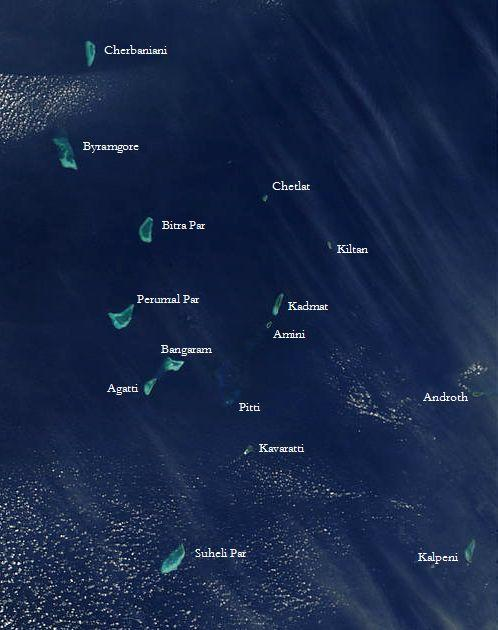
Satellite picture showing the atolls of the Lakshadweep except for Minicoy

Map
