= Jeseri =

Dialect of Malayalam

- Jasari, Dweep Bhasha
- ജസരി
- Native to: India; Lakshadweep
- Region: Lakshadweep
- Ethnicity: Lakshadweep people
- Native speakers: (undated figure of 65,000)
- Language family: Dravidian: Southern; Southern I; Tamil–Kannada; Tamil–Kota; Tamil–Toda; Tamil–Irula; Tamil–Kodava–Urali; Tamil–Malayalam; Malayalamoid; Malayalam; Jeseri
- Dialects: Aminidivi, Koya, Malmi, Melacheri
- Writing system: Malayalam script

Language codes
- ISO 639-3: –

Jeseri (IPA: [dʒeseɾi], also known as Dweep Bhasha) is a dialect of Malayalam, spoken in the Union Territory of Lakshadweep in India.

The word 'Jeseri' derives from Arabic word 'Jazari' (جزري) which means 'Islander' or 'of island'. It is spoken on the islands of Chetlat, Bitra, Kiltan, Kadmat, Amini, Kavaratti, Androth, Agatti, and Kalpeni, in the archipelago of Lakshadweep. Each of these islands has its own dialect. The dialects are similar to Arabi Malayalam, a traditional dialect spoken by the Mappila community of Malabar Coast.

== Phonology ==
The phonology is similar to the Mainland dialect of Old Malayalam, but with certain notable differences.

The initial short vowels, especially 'u', may fall away. For example: rangi (Mal. urangi) - slept, lakka (Mal. ulakka) - pestle.

As for the consonants, the following differences are notable:

1. Initial ch in Mainland Malayalam, becomes sh: sholli (Mal.(old) cholli) - said.
2. Initial p in Mainland Malayalam, becomes f: fenn (Mal. pennu) - girl.
3. Initial v in Mainland Malayalam, becomes b: buli/ bili (Mal. vili) - call.

== Grammar ==
The grammar shows similarities to Mainland Malayalam.

=== Nouns ===
==== Case endings ====
The case endings for nouns and pronouns are generally as follows:

- Nominative: nil;
- Accusative: a, na
- Genitive: aa, naa, thaa;
- Dative: kk, n, oon;
- Communicative: oda, aa kooda, naa kooda;
- Instrumental: aa kond, naa kond;
- Locative: nd, naa ul, l (only in traces);
- Ablative: nd;
- Vocative: e, aa;

==== Pronouns ====
| | | | singular | plural |
|---|---|---|---|---|
| 1st person | exclusive | | naan | nanga |
| 1st person | inclusive | | naan | noo, namma, laaba |
| 2nd person | | | née | ninga |
| 3rd person | proximate | masculine | ben | iba |
| 3rd person | proximate | feminine | bel | iba |
| 3rd person | proximate | neuter | idh | iba |
| 3rd person | remote | masculine | on | aba |
| 3rd person | remote | feminine | ol | aba |
| 3rd person | remote | neuter | adh | aba |

- thaan: self;

=== Verbs ===
The conjugations of verbs are similar to Mainland Malayalam.

The verb 'kaanu' - meaning 'see', the same as in Mainland Malayalam, is illustrated here.

There are three simple tenses.

1. Present: suffix added is nna (mostly nda); so kaanunna/kaanunda - sees, is seeing.
2. Past: the stem of the verb may change as in Mainland Malayalam. For 'kaanu', past is kanda - saw.
3. Future: the suffix added is 'um'. So, kaanum - will see.

The negatives of these tenses show some differences:

1. For present tense, the negative is formed by adding vela (ppela for some verbs) to the stem. Not only that, a present negative may also function as a future negative. So, kaanuvela - is not seeing, does not see, will not see.
2. For past tense, the negative is formed by suffixing ela to the past stem. So, kandela - did not see, has not seen.
3. For the future tense, the old Malayalam poetic suffix 'aa' may be used (kaanaa).

The interrogative forms are made by suffixing 'aa' with some changes effected. So, kaanundyaa (does/do ... see?) for kaanunda (sees), kandyaa (did ... see?) for kanda (saw), and kaanumaa/kaanunaa/kaanungaa (will ... see?) for kaanum (will see).
