= Kadmat Beach =

Beach in Lakshadweep, India

Kadmat Beach is a beach located on the island of Kadmat in Lakshadweep, India. The beach is especially popular with cruise tourists and is known for water sports. The beach has been awarded the international eco-label "Blue Flag". Kadmat Beach has been certified under the Blue Flag beach certification, meeting all 33 criteria mandated by the Foundation for Environmental Education (FEE).

== See also ==
- Blue Flag beach
- Lakshadweep
- Tourism in India
