= Kiltan =

Island in India's Lakshadweep archipelago

Kiltan or Kilthan
KİLTON
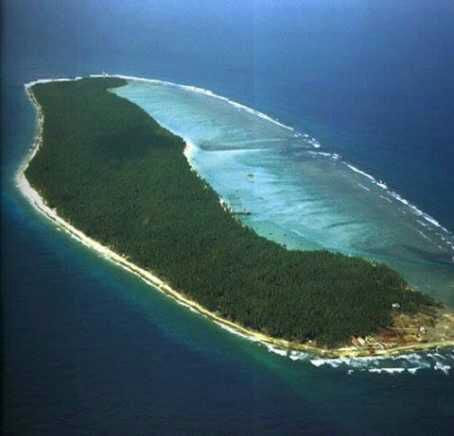
- Northern edge of Kiltan seen from a helicopter, showing also Kulikkara .

- Location within India
- Etymology: 'Keel' means the east is in Jeseri language . 'Than' indicates locating or being. So the name coming from the location of the island lying easternmost of Amindivi subgroup.

Geography
- Location: Arabian Sea
- Coordinates: 11.483°N 73.005°E
- Archipelago: Lakshadweep
- Adjacent to: Laccadive Sea, Arabian Sea and Indian Ocean
- Total islands: 1
- Major islands: Kiltan
- Area: 1.78 km^{2} (0.69 sq mi)
- Area rank: 8th
- Length: 3.4 km (2.11 mi)
- Width: 0.6 km (0.37 mi)
- Coastline: 8.1 km (5.03 mi)
- Highest elevation: 2 m (7 ft)
- Highest point: 44 metre(light house)

Administration
- India
- Territory: Union territory of Lakshadweep
- District: Lakshadweep
- Island group: Aminidivi
- Tehsils of India: Aminidivi
- Subdivisions of India: Kiltan
- Largest settlement: Kacherippadiyar (pop. 1500)

Demographics
- Population: 4041 (2011)
- Population rank: 8
- Pop. density: 2,270/km^{2} (5880/sq mi)
- Ethnic groups: Koyas, Melacheri and Malmi

Additional information
- Time zone: IST (UTC+5:30)
- PIN: 682558
- Telephone code: 04898
- ISO code: IN-LD-08
- Official website: www.lakshadweep.gov.in
- Literacy: 91.4%
- Avg. summer temperature: 32.0 °C (89.6 °F)
- Avg. winter temperature: 28.0 °C (82.4 °F)
- Sex ratio: 1.041 ♂/♀

Kiltan or Kilthān Island is a coral island in the Amindivi subgroup of the Indian Union Territory of Lakshadweep. It is at a distance of 291 km away from Kannur, 303 km away from Kozhikode, and 394 km (245 mi) west of the city of Kochi. The nearest mainland body is Cannanore and the nearest port is Mangalore.

== History ==
Kiltan is settled during early periods of common immigration to the Lakshadweep islands. The island was part of an international trade route between the Persian Gulf and Ceylon.

Kiltan is the home of the Sufi saint Shaikh Ahmed Naqshabanthi.

== Geography ==
Kiltan is one of the populated islands of Lakshadweep. It is located 51 km to the northeast of Amini Island and 32 km to the southeast of Chetlat Island, between 11° 28′ and 11° 30′ N latitude and 72° 59′ and 73° 01′ E longitude, and has an area of 2.20 km^{2}. The reef and lagoon (total area of 3.76 km^{2} (1.45 sq mi)) are located to the west of the island and the dry land has 3.4 km length and 0.6 km width at the broadest point. On the northern and southern ends of the island, there are high storm beaches. This island is 291 km away from Kannur, 303 km away from Kozhikode, and 394 km (213 nautical miles) away from Kochi. Its lagoon area is 1.76 km^{2}.

Kiltan island also has crossed by 73rd meridian east through its landmark known as Kulikkara is a tomb of a Lady venerated by natives.

== Economics ==
Historically, the primary source of income on the island was fishing and coconut production. However, in recent times, the island's residents have diversified their livelihoods, venturing into various fields, including government positions (in education, police, communication, transportation, business, and IT) and private employment opportunities like construction (building and road development), plumbing, and electrical work.

== Demographics ==
The population in Kiltan was 3945 as per census 2011. Most people from Kiltan, as in Amini and Kadmat, belonged to the Koya, Mali and Melacheri families. The language spoken is Jeseri, a mixture of Malayalam and Tamil influenced by Arabic as in other islands. But the peoples don't use its script because its writing was stopped too earlier period. Kiltan has rich folk cultures and warm hospitality to its tradition. The Island has a 41-metre lighthouse and an average Heliport t used by Administration for Emergency medical services.

In the past, Kiltan was nicknamed as Cheriyaponnani meaning Little Ponnani because of the Islanders acquired knowledge from here during the pre-colonial periods in relative that the Ponnani was known for centre of Islamic Religious knowledge in Southern India.

== Administration ==
The island has a Sub Divisional Officer appointing by administration from Kavaratti the Union capital of Lakshadweep commanding as executive and judicial head of islands. The Police station of Kiltan have dozens of constables and marines under a sub-inspector. Also there have a base camp for IRBN (India Reserve Bettalion) for duties such as safeguarding of Treasury and use as additional force with police in case of an emergency.

== Image gallery ==
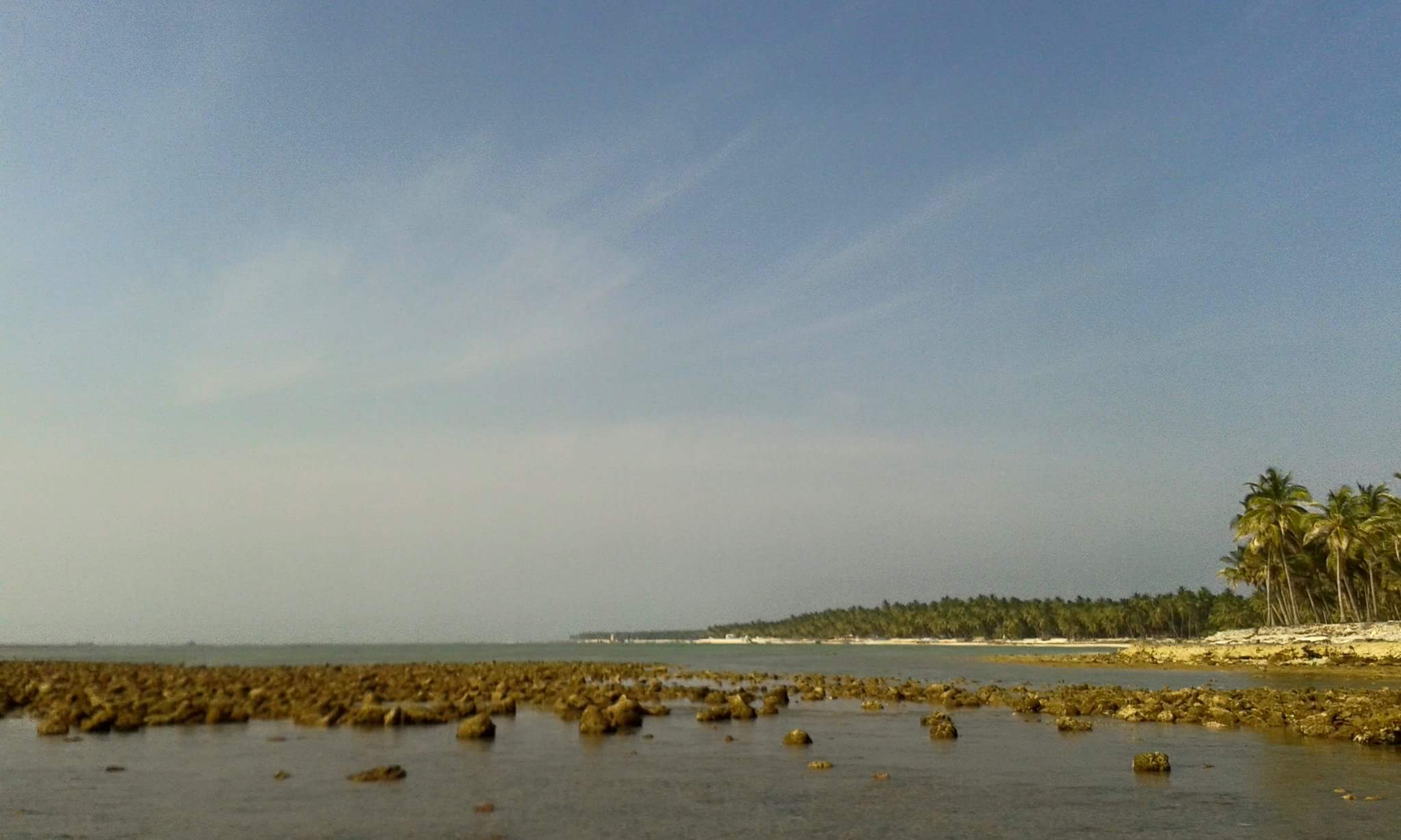
Kiltan island seen from southern extreme point of reef also here is a small channel named Mooni

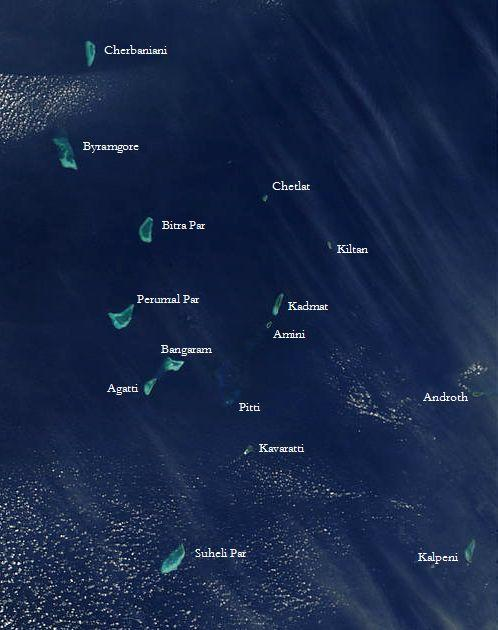
Satellite picture showing the atolls of the Lakshadweep except for Minicoy

Map

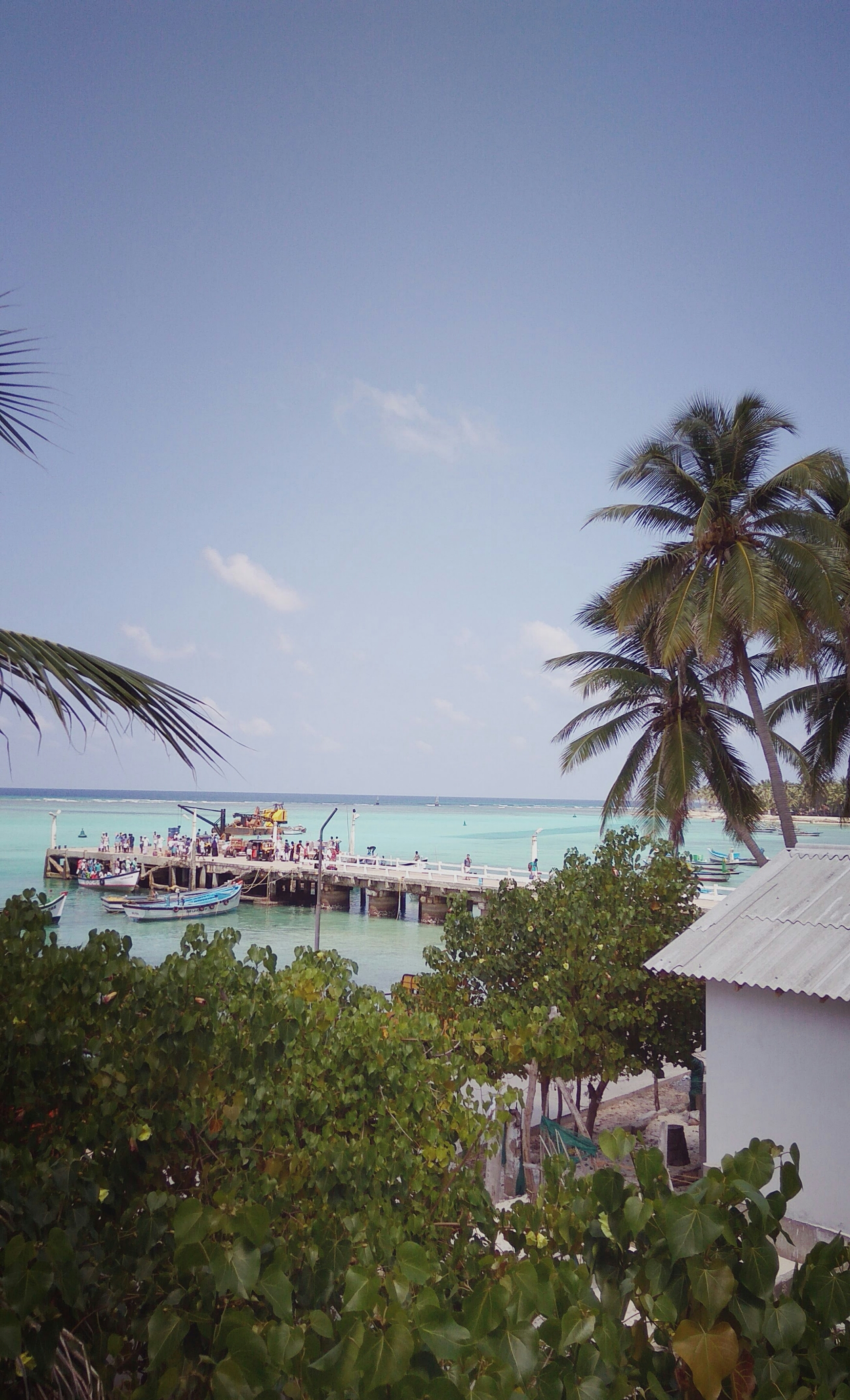
Kiltan jetty

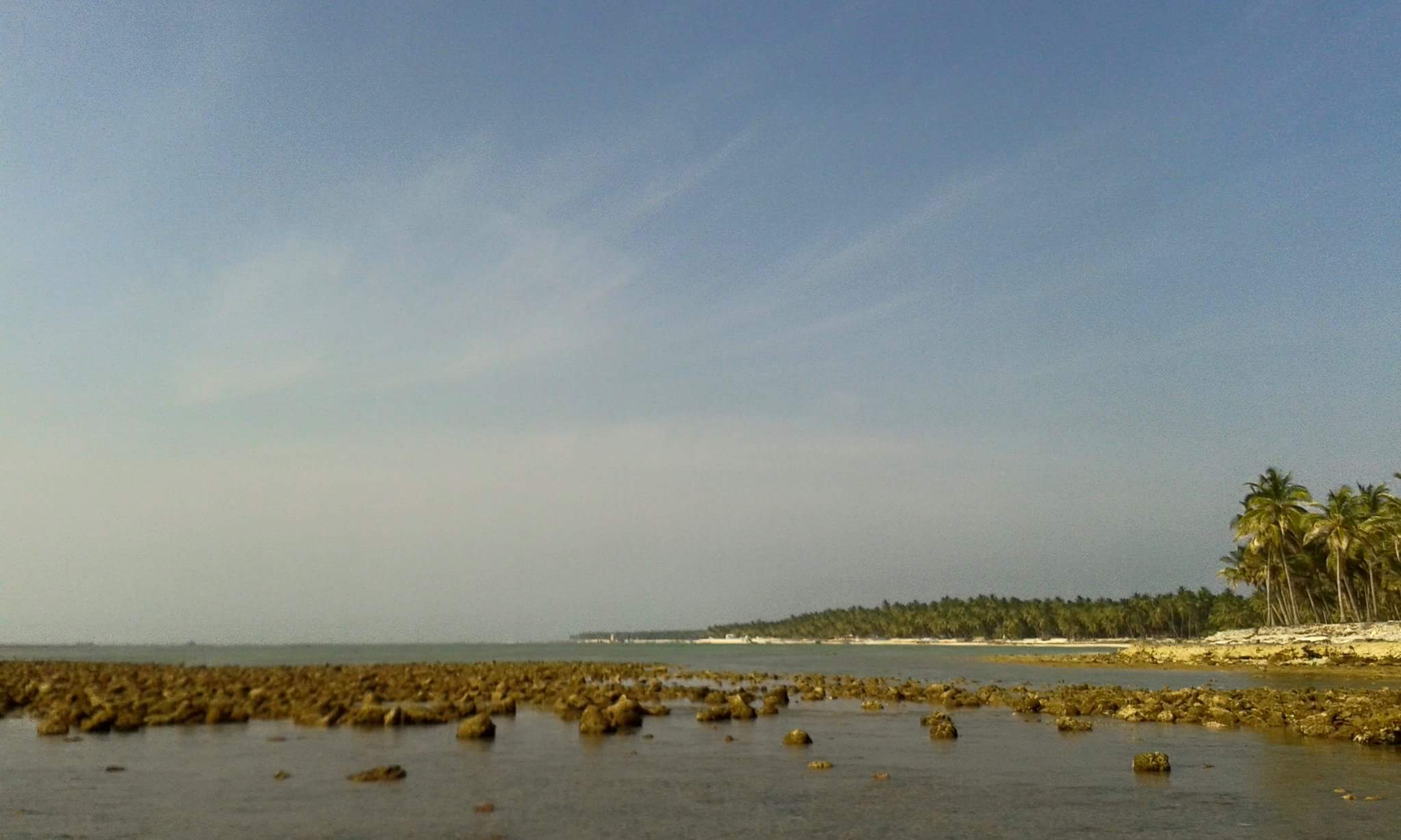
Kiltan island seen from southern extreme point of reef also here is a small channel named Mooni

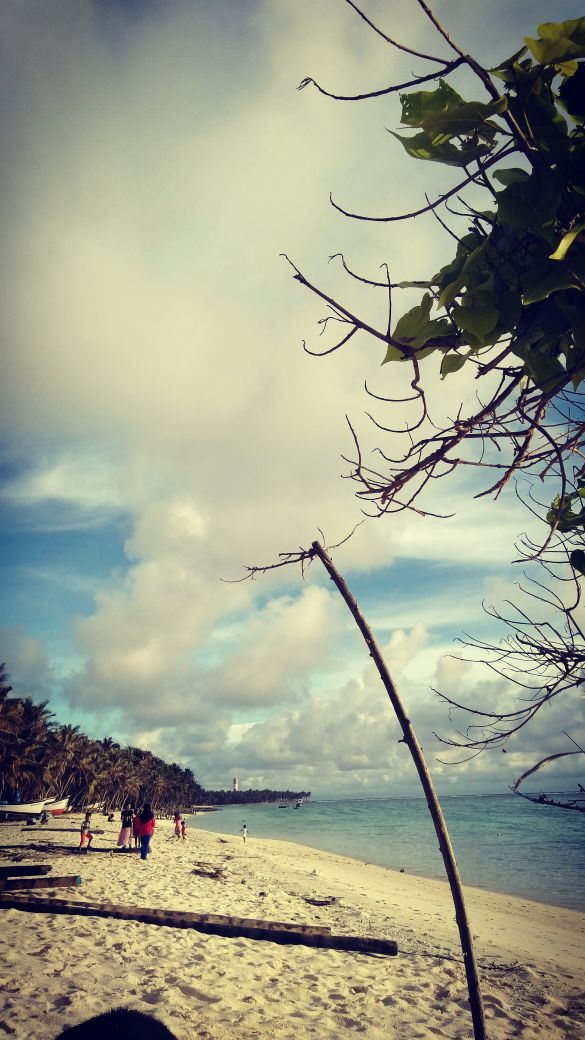
An evening from Cocafulluckyar Kiltan Island
