= Aminidivi =

Aminidivi അമിനിദ്വീപ് Amindivi Islands
- Island subgroup Aminidivi (India)
- Interactive map of Aminidivi അമിനിദ്വീപ്
- Country: India
- State: Lakshadweep
- District: Lakshadweep

Area
  - Total: 9.26 km^{2} (3.58 sq mi)

Languages
  - Official: Malayalam
- Time zone: UTC+5:30 (IST)
- Vehicle registration: LD

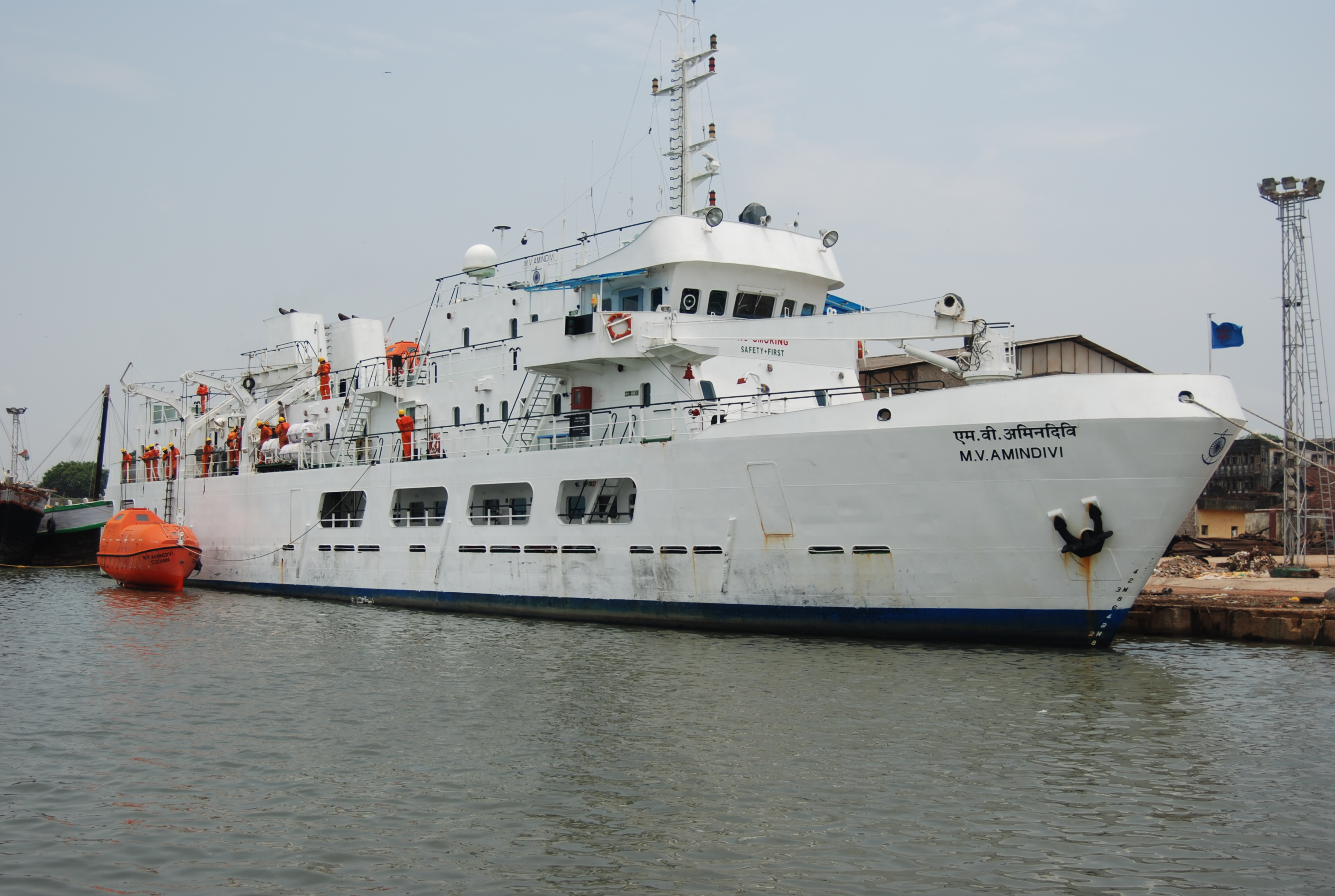
M.V. Amindivi, a passenger ship of the Lakshadweep Islands administration named after the island subgroup

The Aminidivi Islands (Malayalam: [ɐminid̪βʷiːbɨ̆]) are one of the three island subgroups in the Union Territory of Lakshadweep, India. It is the northern group of the Lakshadweep, separated from the Laccadive Islands subgroup roughly by the 11th parallel north. The total land area of the group is 9.26 km^{2}.

Formerly the Union Territory was known as Laccadive, Minicoy, and Amindivi Islands, a name that was changed to Lakshadweep by an act of Parliament in 1973. The Aminidivi group forms a taluka or subdivision. The islands of Amini, Kiltan, Chetlat, Kadmat and Bitra are inhabited. The population numbered 18,876 at the 2001 census and Islam is the main religion of the islanders.

Aminidivi has the highest recorded rainfall in India in a 24-hour period, at 1,168 mm recorded on 2004-05-06.

== Geography ==
Aminidivi consists of atolls with islands, three reefs or atolls with only unvegetated sand cays above the high water mark, and four submerged banks. In addition, there is the island that gives its name to the group, Amini, which is located at 11°06′N 72°45′E at the northwestern end of Pitti Bank, a largely sunken atoll.

Atoll/Reef/Bank (alternate name)	type	Land Area (km^{2})	Lagoon Area km^{2}	No. of islets	Pop. Census 2001	Location
Amindivi Islands
Cora Divh	bank	-	339.45	-	-	13°42′N 72°11′E
Sesostris Bank	bank	-	388.53	-	-	13°08′N 72°00′E
Bassas de Pedro (Munyal Par, Padua Bank)	bank	-	2474.33	-	-	13°07′N 72°25′E
Cherbaniani Reef (Beleapani Reef)	reef	0.01	172.59	2	-	12°18′N 71°53′E
Byramgore Reef (Chereapani)	reef	0.01	57.46	1	-	11°54′N 71°49′E
Chetlat Island	atoll	1.14	1.60	1	2289	11°42′N 72°42′E
Bitrā Island	atoll	0.10	45.61	2	264	11°33′N 72°09′E
Kiltān Island	atoll	2.20	1.76	1	3664	11°29′N 73°00′E
Kadmat Island (Cardamom)	atoll	3.20	37.50	1	5319	11°14′N 72°47′E
Elikalpeni Bank	bank	-	95.91	-	-	11°12′N 73°58′E
Perumal Par	reef	0.01	83.02	1	-	11°10′N 72°04′E
Amini Island^{1)}	atoll	2.59	155.09^{1)}	1	7340	11°06′N 72°45′E

== Climate ==
Climate data for Aminidivi (1991–2020, extremes 1901–2012)
Month	Jan	Feb	Mar	Apr	May	Jun	Jul	Aug	Sep	Oct	Nov	Dec	Year
Record high °C (°F)	36.7 (98.1)	35.7 (96.3)	37.2 (99.0)	37.7 (99.9)	37.5 (99.5)	36.2 (97.2)	33.3 (91.9)	34.4 (93.9)	33.9 (93.0)	36.4 (97.5)	35.0 (95.0)	35.1 (95.2)	37.7 (99.9)
Mean daily maximum °C (°F)	32.2 (90.0)	32.8 (91.0)	33.3 (91.9)	34.0 (93.2)	33.6 (92.5)	30.7 (87.3)	29.8 (85.6)	29.8 (85.6)	30.4 (86.7)	30.9 (87.6)	31.8 (89.2)	32.0 (89.6)	31.8 (89.2)
Mean daily minimum °C (°F)	23.9 (75.0)	24.5 (76.1)	25.5 (77.9)	26.7 (80.1)	26.9 (80.4)	25.7 (78.3)	25.3 (77.5)	25.3 (77.5)	25.2 (77.4)	25.0 (77.0)	24.7 (76.5)	24.0 (75.2)	25.2 (77.4)
Record low °C (°F)	18.9 (66.0)	19.4 (66.9)	20.0 (68.0)	20.0 (68.0)	16.6 (61.9)	21.1 (70.0)	21.0 (69.8)	20.9 (69.6)	21.3 (70.3)	19.7 (67.5)	18.3 (64.9)	18.9 (66.0)	18.3 (64.9)
Average rainfall mm (inches)	16.3 (0.64)	2.2 (0.09)	1.8 (0.07)	15.5 (0.61)	132.6 (5.22)	360.6 (14.20)	348.8 (13.73)	237.3 (9.34)	176.8 (6.96)	170.1 (6.70)	92.0 (3.62)	55.9 (2.20)	1,610.1 (63.39)
Average rainy days	0.6	0.1	0.2	1.1	5.7	16.6	17.1	13.2	10.8	9.4	5.2	2.6	82.7
Average relative humidity (%) (at 17:30 IST)	68	68	68	69	73	84	86	85	81	79	76	71	76
Source: India Meteorological Department

== History ==
The islands were inhabited from ancient times by people of nearby Kerala to which were added later people of Arab descent. Vasco da Gama visited these islands around 1498. In the mid 16th century all the inhabited islands of the Lakshadweep were conferred as jagir on the ruling family of the Cannanore Kingdom (Arakkal Kingdom) by the Chirakkal or Kolattiri Raja in order to grant protection from the Portuguese.

In the latter quarter of the 18th century the islands of the Amindivi group of the Lakshadweep revolted owing to the rigours of the enforcement of the monopoly of coir rope trade. Following the uprising, the northern islands put themselves under the rule of the Kingdom of Mysore in 1784, then ruled by Tippu Sultan. The southern group of the Cannanore Islands, however, remained loyal to the Arakkal Kingdom.

In 1792, as a consequence of the Third Anglo-Mysore War and the defeat of Tippu Sultan, the Amindivi Islands came under the East India Company rule following the treaty of Srirangapatna. The Amindivi subgroup was then attached to the Kasaragod taluk of South Canara in the Madras Presidency of the British Raj in 1799, hence they also became known as the South Kanara Islands.

== Bibliography ==
- R. H. Ellis, A Short Account of the Laccadive Islands and Minicoy. Government Press, Madras, 1924
- K.P. Ittaman, Amini Islanders: Social Structure and Change, Abhinav Publications, Delhi, 1976, ASIN B0060D0XK8
