= Kadmat Island =

Coral island of the Lakshadweep archipelago in India

Coordinates: 11.223°N 72.776°E

Kadmat Island, situated to the bottom right of the Aminidivi Islands label

Kadmat Island, also known as Cardamom Island, is a coral island belonging to the Amindivi subgroup of islands of the Lakshadweep archipelago in India. Measuring 9.3 kilometres (5.8 mi) in length, the island has a lagoon with a width of 1.5 kilometres (0.93 mi) covering an area of 25 square kilometres (9.7 sq mi). The ecological feature of the island is the coral reef with seagrass, and marine turtles which nestle here. The Ministry of Environment and Forests (India) has notified the island as a marine protected area for ensuring conservation of the island's animal, plant, or other organisms and resources.

The only inhabited village on the island is Kadmat, which had a population of 5,389 according to 2011 census. Fishing is the main economic activity on the island, and agriculture is limited to 5% of the land area. Tourism is legal and the attractions are kayaking, snorkeling and leisure trips by a glass-bottomed boat for scuba diving.

== Geography and climate ==
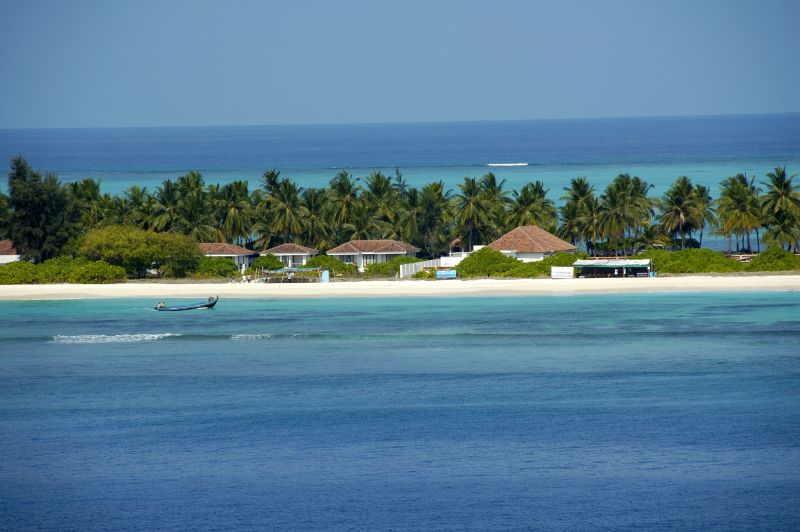
The beach side resort at Kadmat Island

Kadmat Island, which belongs to the township of Kadmat Island of Aminidivi Tehsil. is the central most island of the Lakshadweep archipelago. It is in the shape of a tear drop, with 3.5 square kilometres (1.4 sq mi) area and is located on a coral reef. With a length of 9.3 kilometres (5.8 mi) (Note: Various sources differ in their reporting of the length. A number of sources claim 8 km, while the Geological Survey of Indian states 9.25 kilometres (5.75 mi).) from north to south and a maximum width of 0.57 kilometres (0.35 mi) and it is the longest island in the Amindivi group. Its southern end is the narrowest with a width of about 10 metres (33 ft). The island's topography is about 2.0 to 3 metres (6 ft 7 in to 9 ft 10 in) on the eastern side and 2.0 to 4 metres (6 ft 7 in to 13 ft 1 in) on the western part above the mean sea level. Its surface formation consists of coral conglomerate overlying broken pieces of coral and coral sand.

The lagoon on the western side of the island extends over a maximum width of 2 kilometres (1.2 mi) covering an area of 37 square kilometres (14 sq mi) and the water depth is shallow about 2 to 3 metres (6 ft 7 in to 9 ft 10 in). It has a shore line and has a sandy beach. The reef width is about 50 metres (160 ft). The tidal range lies between 0.6 to 1.6 metres (2 ft 0 in to 5 ft 3 in). The beach on the eastern side of the island has a width of 100 metres (330 ft). At the breaking zone of this beach there is a 100 metres (330 ft) wide coral algae ridge.

Kadmat Island is bounded by Kavaratti Island to its northwest at a distance of 67 kilometres (42 mi). It is 32 kilometres (20 mi) away from Kiltan Island. Amini Island, which marks the northwestern part of the Pitti Bank formation, is 5 kilometres (3.1 mi) to the southwest. Kannur is 292 kilometres (181 mi) away, Kozhikode is 327 kilometres (203 mi) away and Kochi is 407 kilometres (253 mi) away.

There is an airport on nearby Agatti Island, in which flights operate from Cochin. From Agatti, it is a two and half hours boat ride to Kadmat. Ferry services also operate from Cochin on the coast of Kerala but involves a journey of 16 hours.

== Climate and the environment ==
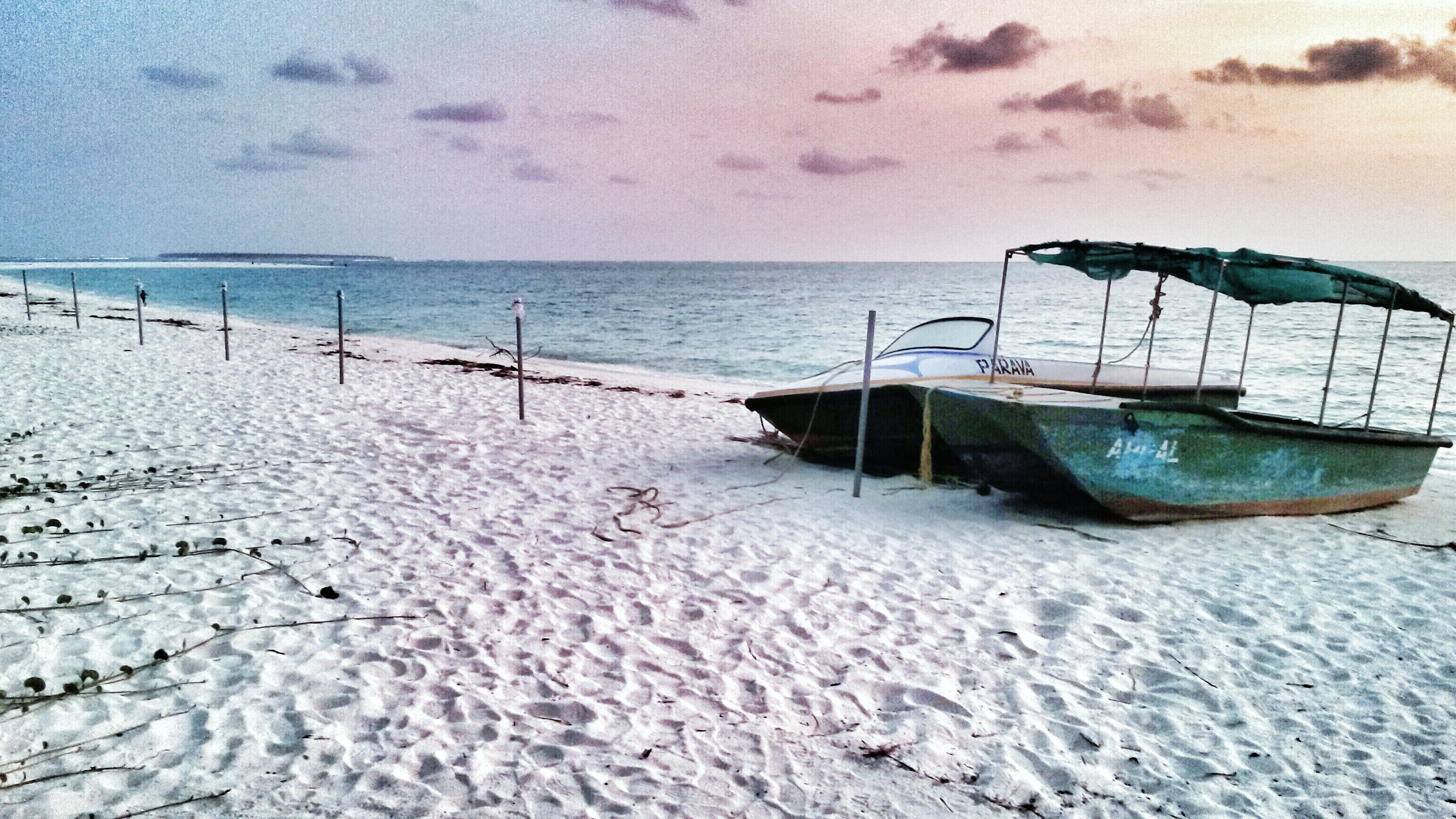
Boats on the beach of Kadmat

The island experiences an average annual temperature in the range of 24.2–34.4 °C (75.6–93.9 °F). Rainfall occurs during the monsoon season from May to September with an average annual rainfall incidence of 1,237 millimetres (48.7 in) as per records of the nearby island of Amini. The maximum rainfall recorded in a day is 241.8 millimetres (9.52 in). Humidity averages at 72.5%.

Ecologically, the island is composed of coral reef with seagrass, and marine turtles which nestle here. Keeping this aspect in view, the Ministry of Environment and Forests (India) has notified the island as a marine protected area to enable conservation of the island's animal, plant, or other type of organism, and other resources. The coral reefs are damaged to the extent of 10% (assessed by IUCN in 1976) due to anthropocentric pressure and also due to climate change. Dredging operation at the entry to the island is causing damage to coral species as the dredged material is dumped into the lagoon. Coral blocks found in the beaches and the coral flats are extracted for building activity on the island. This could cause serious geo-morphological changes of the island in the form of sea erosion of the shores and the beach. Coral bleaching, a natural phenomenon attributed to strong El Niños, which occurred during 1998 due to seawater warming, is reported to have reduced the number of coral species from 45 to 9.

== Demographics ==
Religion in Kadmat Island (2011)
1. Islam (97.7%)
2. Hinduism (1.92%)
3. Christianity (0.24%)
4. Others (0.15%)
5. Not Stated (0.04%)

The island is inhabited mainly by individuals of the Melacceri caste. Kadmat village is the only inhabited village on the island. According to the 2011 census the island had a population of 5,389 consisting of 2,676 males and 2,713 females. Population density is 1,727 per km^{2}. Decennial Growth Rate recorded for the period 2001–2011 was 1.03 percent. In 2001, the literacy rate was 87.88 percent of which male literacy rate was 91.78 and female literacy was 92.53; in both cases much higher than of the Lakshadweep island. Jasari/Jazary is the dominant language of the people of the island and the literacy rate is as high as 90.4%.

The island has a network of roads, several ponds and wells, primary and higher secondary schools, electricity, telephone, health centres and so forth.

In 1960, a hoard of coins were unearthed and examined, revealing that the island has been inhabited since at least 200 AD. Kadmat island is known to have traded with the Romans, as in 1948 a girl found a Roman coin in a quarry on the island.

== Economy ==
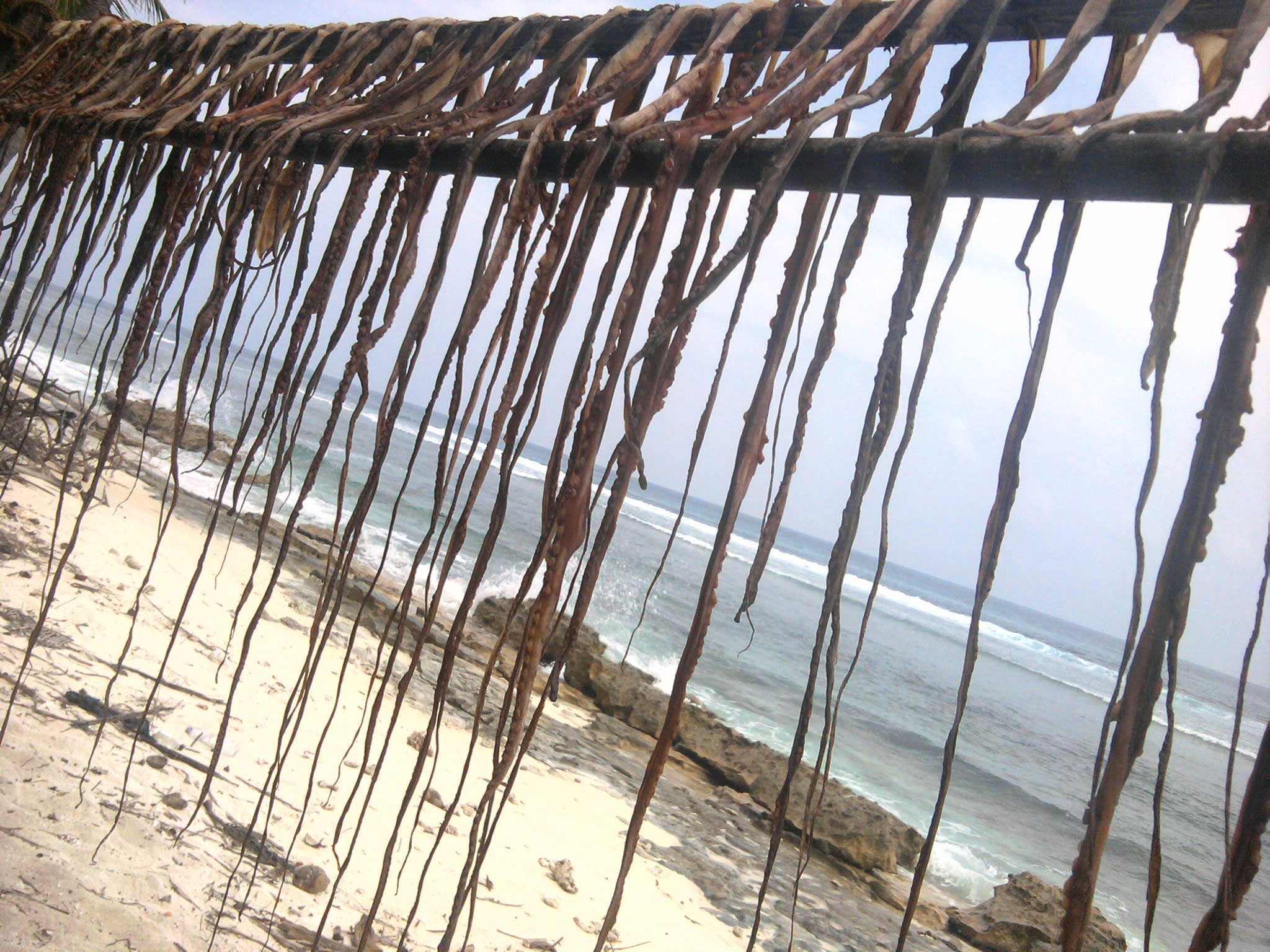
Drying octopus on Kadmat

Fishing is the principal activity of the people of the island. Fishing is done both off shore in the sea and during the monsoon season in the lagoon and reef area. Trawl nets and pole line are used for oceanic tuna fishing. Wooden boats are used for local fishing in the lagoon. Fish species reported include carangids, cephalopods, perches, rainbow sardine, rays, sailfish, sharks, skipjack tuna, and tuna. Agriculture is practised, with about 5% of the land area brought under cultivation. Coconut plantations are common along with associated coir twinning. Crops grown include red grass, groundnut, maize, sweet potato, grains, cereals, millets, papaya, and banana.

Tourism has taken off on the island, though it only has one beach resort for 50 guests. There are kayaking and snorkeling facilities, and leisure trips by a glass-bottomed boat for scuba diving. In 1998 the first Water Sports Institute was established on Kadmat, along with the Laccadives Diving Centre.

== Wildlife ==
The island has three types of habitats: coral reef, seagrass and nesting ground for marine turtles. Zoning of the coral reef is mapped under three zones of reef flat, reef slope and lagoon. Next to the shore line are the fringing reefs where fish species of fin and shell fishes spawn, and are found in abundance. As of 1986, there were 45 coral species in the reef. These are threatened due to human interference and natural causes. Live coral is reported in less than 1% area. There are 9 species of live corals in the lagoon and reef slope area. The species of live corals reported are: Acropora formosa (staghorn coral), Acropora robusta, Acropora, Acropora subglabra, Acropora tortuosa, Acropora vaughani, Favites, Pocillopora verrucosa and Lobophytum Benthic organisms are reported on the reef slope and lagoon area. Macrobenthos are found in the inter-tidal and sub-tidal area. 23 species of polychaetes, 3 species of bivalves, 3 species of crustaceans, and 3 species of gastropods have been recorded.

The seagrass beds, which forms an area of around 13.8 square kilometres (5.3 sq mi) across the island, provide crucial food for turtles and dugongs, with four species of marine turtles reported: Chelonia mydas (green sea turtle), Dermochelys coriacea (leatherback sea turtle), and Eretmochelys imbricata (Hawksbill sea turtle) and Lepidochelys olivacea (Olive Ridley sea turtle). There are 7 species of seagrass reported here, out of 14 found in the Lakshadweep Islands, including the Thalassia hemprichii and Cymodocea rotundata. Seaweeds recorded consist of 34 species, out of which 14 species are of Rhodophyceae, 13 (red algae) are Chlorophyceae (green algae) and 7 species are Phaeophyceae (brown algae). 20 species of Phytoplankton and 19 groups of Zooplankton have been recorded in the reef slope and lagoon area; 33 species of benthic organisms have also been noted in the same vicinity.

== Kadmat Beach ==
Kadmat Beach is one of the prominent features of Kadmat Island. The beach is known for its clear waters and rich marine life, making it a popular destination for water sports like Snorkeling and Scuba diving. Kadmat Beach has also been awarded the prestigious Blue Flag beach certification for its commitment to environmental sustainability and safety standards.

== Bibliography ==
- Athawale, Sanhita (1991). India's Indian Ocean islands: a study in India's Indian Ocean islands, their geographic, demographic, political, and strategic importance. ABC Pub. House. ISBN 978-81-7123-051-8.
- Carlsen, Jack; Butler, Richard (2011). Island Tourism: Towards a Sustainable Perspective. CABI. ISBN 978-1-84593-699-0.
- Sri, Rajaguru (2001). "Critical Habitat Information System (CHIS) on Kadmat Island – Lakshadweep". Institute for Ocean Management, Anna University.
- Green, Edmund Peter; Short, Frederick T. (2003). World Atlas of Seagrasses. University of California Press. ISBN 978-0-520-24047-6.
- Mukerji, Sarit Kumar (1992). Islands of India. Publications Division, Ministry of Information and Broadcasting, Government of India.
- Prakash, T.N.; Nair, L. Sheela; Hameed, T.S. Shahul (17 November 2014). Geomorphology and Physical Oceanography of the Lakshadweep Coral Islands in the Indian Ocean. Springer. ISBN 978-3-319-12367-7.
