= Lakshadweep =

Union territory of India

- Union Territory
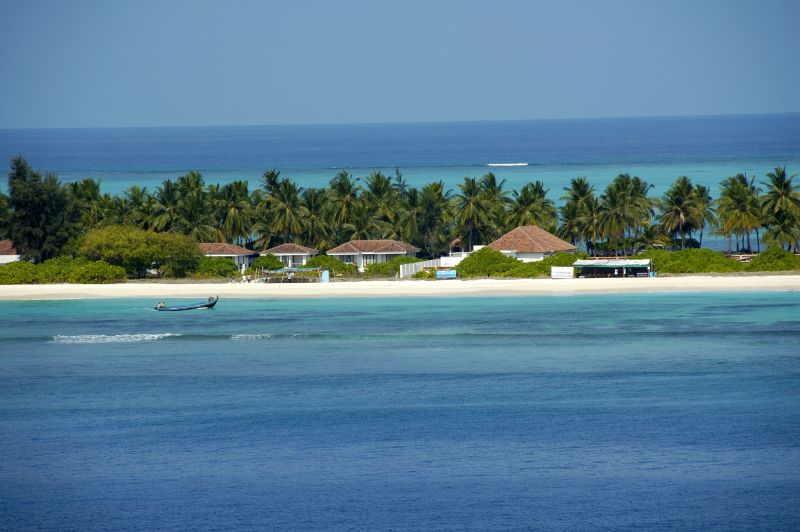
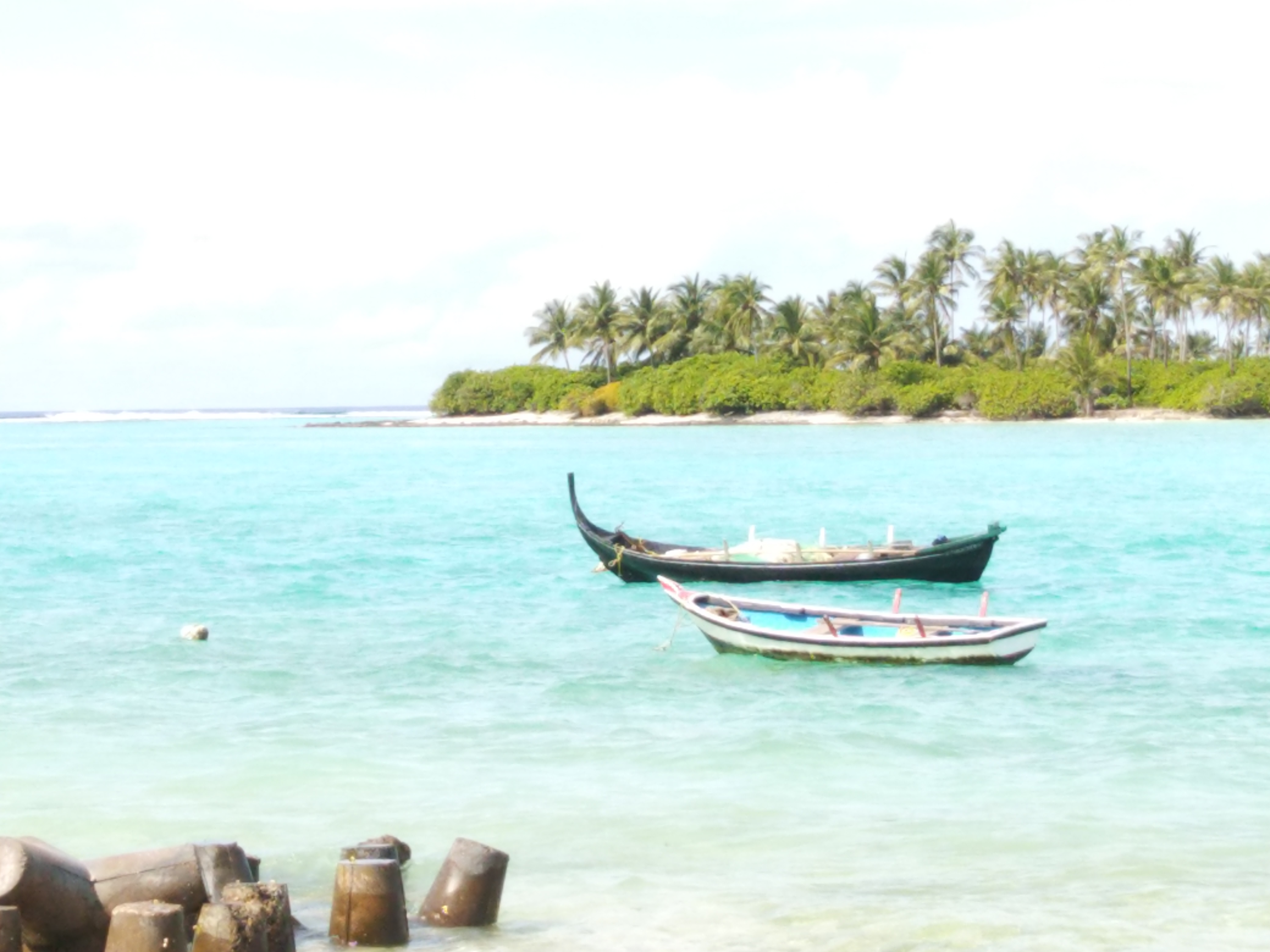
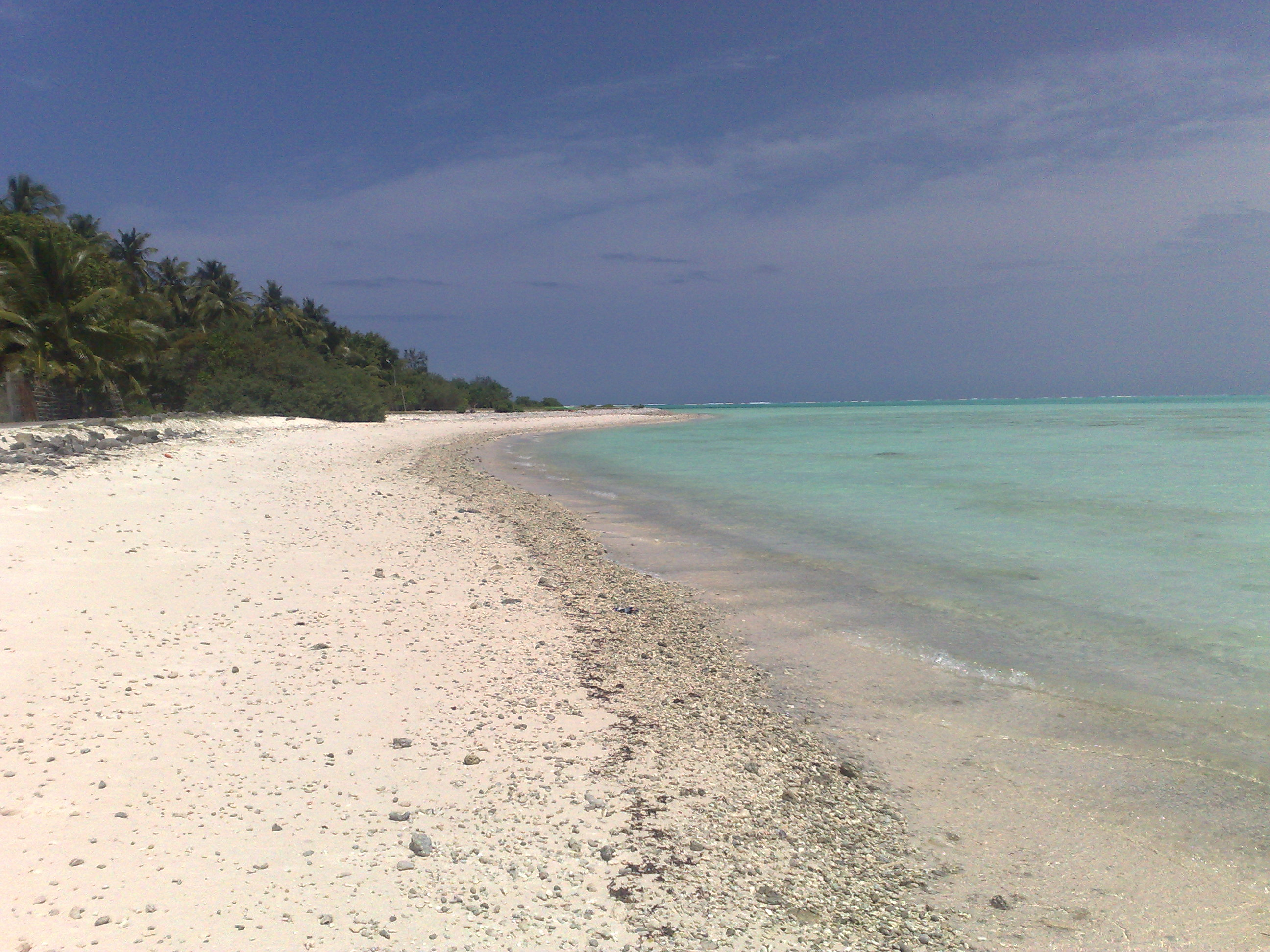
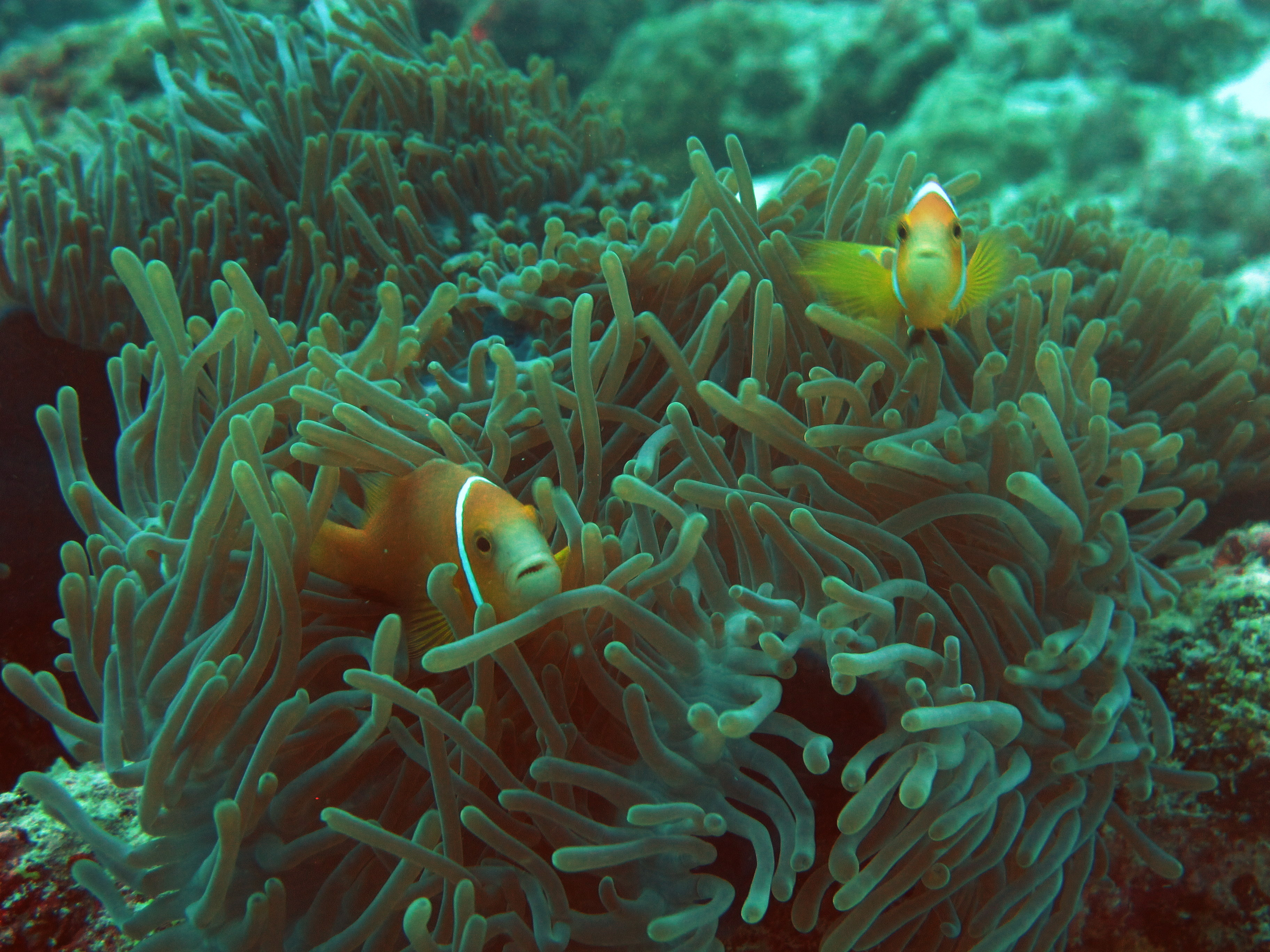
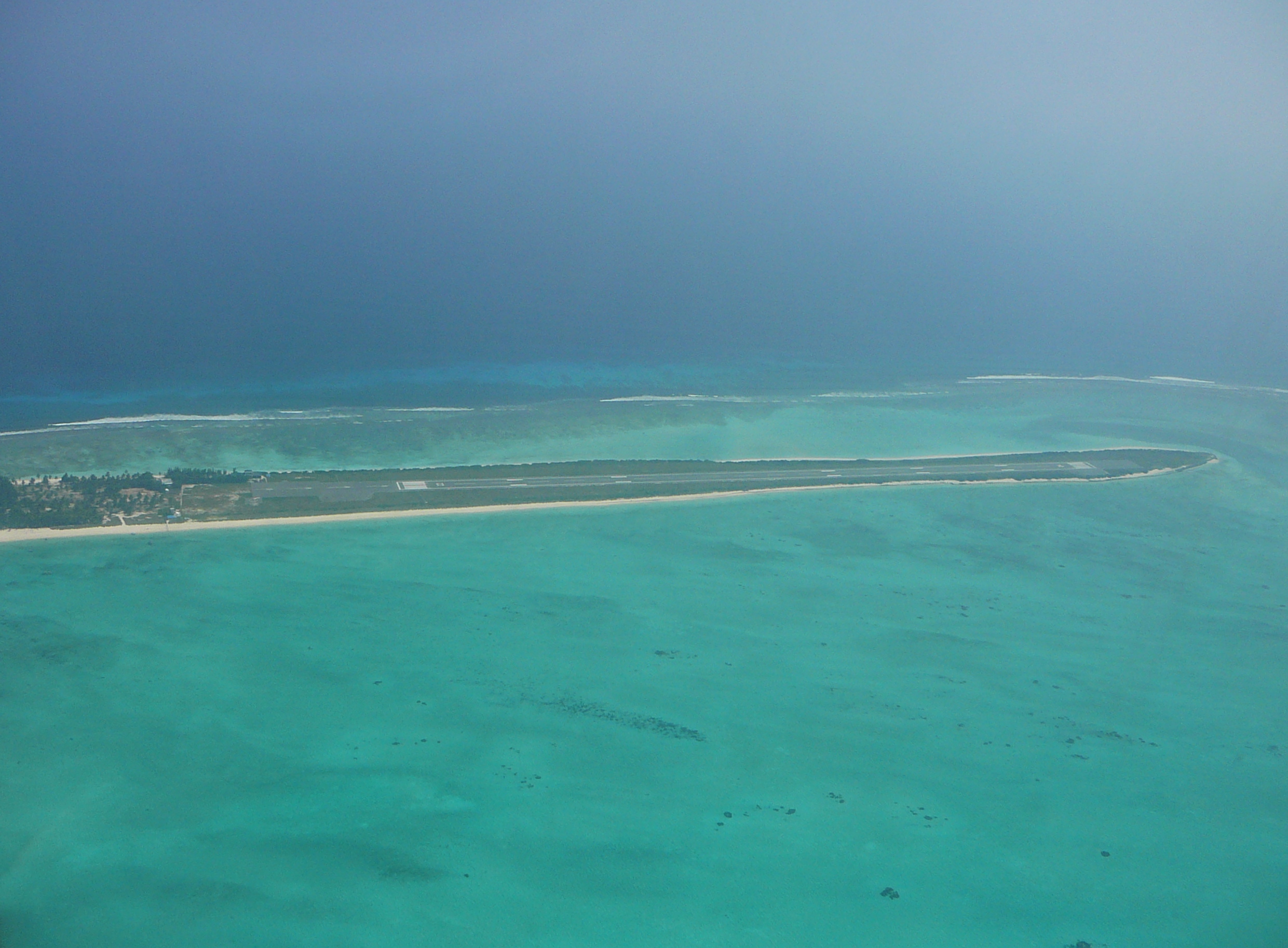
- Kadmat Island Kalpeni Island Minicoy Island Reefs in the Laccadive Sea Airport on Agatti Island

- Emblem of Lakshadweep

- Location of Lakshadweep in India
- Coordinates: 10.57°N 72.64°E
- Country: India
- Region: South India
- Formation: 1 November 1956
- Capital and largest city: Kavaratti

Government
  - Body: Government of Lakshadweep
  - Administrator: Praful Khoda Patel

Area
  - Total: 32.62 km^{2} (12.59 sq mi)
  - Rank: 36th
- Highest elevation (Unnamed point on Agatti Island): 15 m (49 ft)
- Lowest elevation (Arabian Sea and Laccadive Sea): 0 m (0 ft)

Population (2011)
  - Total: 64,473
  - Density: 1,976/km^{2} (5,120/sq mi)

Language
  - Official: English
  - Additional official: Malayalam (Note: The UT is part of Group C region in Official Language Rules, 1976 which uses English as the official language, but notifications and circulars have been published in Malayalam for regulations.)
- Time zone: UTC+05:30 (IST)
- ISO 3166 code: IN-LD
- Vehicle registration: LD
- HDI (2022): ▲0.719 high (7th)
- Literacy (2024): 97.3% (2nd)
- Sex ratio (2011): 946♀/1000 ♂ (1st)
- Website: lakshadweep.gov.in
- Symbols of Lakshadweep
- Bird: Sooty tern
- Fish: Butterfly fish
- Flower: Neelakurinji
- Tree: Bread fruit
- List of union territory symbols

Lakshadweep (Note: Malayalam: [lɐkʂɐd̪βʷiːbɨ̆]) is a union territory of India. It is an archipelago of 36 islands (Note: Though one of the islands—Parali 1 island, part of Bangaram Atoll—has been completely inundated by 2017, official sources maintain the count at 36.) divided into three island subgroups: the Amindivi Islands in the north, the Laccadive Islands (separated from Amindivi roughly by the 11th parallel north), and the atoll of Minicoy to the south of the Nine Degree Channel. The islands are located between the Arabian Sea to the west and the Laccadive Sea to the east, about 220–440 km (140–270 mi) off the Malabar Coast of mainland India.

The islands occupy a total land area of approximately 32.62 km^{2} (12.59 sq mi) with a population of 64,473 as per the 2011 census, spread across the ten inhabited islands. There is a 132 km (82 mi) long coastline with a lagoon area of 4,200 km^{2} (1,600 sq mi), territorial waters of 20,000 km^{2} (7,700 sq mi) and an exclusive economic zone of 400,000 km^{2} (150,000 sq mi). Lakshadweep is the northernmost island group of the exposed undersea mountain range, the Chagos-Lakshadweep Ridge. The entire union territory is administered as a single district, with Kavaratti as its capital.

Archaeological evidence from Kalpeni indicates human settlement in the region from at least 1500 BCE with early references to the islands in the Buddhist Jataka tales from the 3rd century BCE and the Tamil Sangam literature Patiṟṟuppattu. The region was controlled by the Cheras in the Sangam period (3rd century BCE to 3rd century CE) and later by the Pallavas. Islam is presumed to have been brought to the islands in the 7th century with the arrival of Muslims. In the 11th century CE, the region was under the influence of the Chola kingdom and formed a part of the trade route that connected the Middle East with South Asia. It came under the influence of the Portuguese briefly in the late 15th century CE before being ruled by the Arakkal kingdom, who were vassals of the Kolathiri Rajas of Kannur. The region was under the influence of the Mysore kingdom in the late 18th century and was later annexed by the British Empire in 1799 CE. The islands became part of the Dominion of India following the Indian independence in 1947 and were incorporated as a union territory in 1956.

The name Lakshadweep literally means "one hundred thousand islands" in Malayalam and Sanskrit. English is the designated official language, while Jeseri, a dialect of Malayalam, is the widely spoken native language. Dhivehi is the most widely spoken language on Minicoy Island. The region comes under the judicial jurisdiction of the Kerala High Court. Fishing and agriculture are the major occupations in the islands.

== Etymology ==
The name Lakshadweep literally means "one hundred thousand (laksha) islands" in Sanskrit and Malayalam. Laccadives seems to be an anglicization of that given name (also a doublet) during the British Raj. Amindivi derives its name from the Amindivi people, who were the earliest inhabitants of the Amini Island. The native name of Minicoy Island is Maliku, and the given name is the anglicized version derived from the Nicobarese word Minikaa-raajje (meaning "land of the cannibals") as the island was known then in the Andaman and Nicobar.

== History ==
=== Early history ===
The early human migration from Africa to the Andaman Islands through India was thought by scientists to include Lakshadweep because of its location between Africa and the southwestern region of India. However, later genetic studies indicated that the majority of human ancestry in the islands derived from South Asia. Archaeological evidence from Kalpeni indicate the existence of human settlements in the region from at least 1500 BCE. The islands are mentioned in the Buddhist Jataka tales, dated to 3rd century CE. Archeological evidence indicates the spread of Buddhism to the islands during the time of Sanghmitra, the daughter of emperor Ashoka, presumed to have visited the island. Tamil Sangam literature Patiṟṟuppattu mentions that the region was ruled by the Cheras, one of the three kingdoms of ancient Tamilakam, in the Sangam period (3rd century BCE to 3rd century CE).

The islands have been known to sailors since at least 1st century CE, as indicated in the Periplus of the Erythraean Sea. It contains an anonymous reference to the islands off the coast of Damirica as a source of a turtle shell. In 2nd century CE, Greek geographer Ptolemy mentions 1378 islands located opposite to Taprobane (Sri Lanka) with the names of some of the islands given as Kanathara (Kavaratti), Argidion (Agatti), Ammine (Amini), and Monache (Minicoy). The islands later became part of a trade route with the Roman Empire, with archeological evidence from as early as 2nd century CE obtained from Kadamath and Androth islands. Other travelers and historians such as Ammianus Marcellinus (4th century CE), Faxian (5th century CE), and Cosmas (6th century CE) mention the islands in their writings.

=== Middle Ages ===
Local traditions attribute the first settlement on the islands to Cheraman Perumal, the last Chera king of Kerala, though no historical evidence exists apart from the presence of ancient Hindu social stratification. According to local tradition, Islam was brought to the islands by Ubaidullah in 661 CE, whose purported grave is located in the Andrott island. Inscriptions from Vayalur (in Tamil Nadu) indicates a naval battle fought during the reign of Narasimhavarman II (680–720 CE), which resulted in the capture of the territory by the Pallavas of Kanchi in the late 7th century CE. Epigraphs indicate the capture of the region of Kavadi Dvepa (presumably Kavaratti) by the Kadambas in the 10th century CE. In the 11th century CE, the islands came under the rule of the Cholas. Chola inscriptions from Thanjavur, indicate that the region was captured by Rajendra Chola I in 1018-19 CE. In the late 11th century CE, it became part of a small Hindu kingdom before being passed on to the Kingdom of Kannur in early 12th century CE. The islands are mentioned in the writings of travelers Marco Polo and Ibn Battuta in the 13th–14th century CE.

=== European colonization ===
Map of the islands (1877)

In the late 15th century CE, the islands came under the control of the Portuguese as a source of coir for their industries. The native islanders revolted against the Portuguese and expelled them in 1545 CE. In the mid 16th century CE, all inhabited islands were conferred as jagir (land grant) to the ruling family of Kannur by the Chirakkal family of Kolathiri to grant protection from the Portuguese. The Aminidivi islands came under the rule of Tipu Sultan of Mysore Kingdom in 1787 CE and were later annexed to the British Raj in 1799 CE after the Fourth Anglo-Mysore War. The rest of the islands remained under the suzerainty of the Arakkal family in return for a payment of annual tribute to the British. The British took over the administration of these islands in 1908 CE, citing the nonpayment of taxes, and attached it to the Madras Presidency.

=== Post Independence ===
After Indian Independence from colonial British rule in 1947, the islands became part of the Dominion of India, and later came under the administration of the Madras State after the Constitution of India was enacted in 1950. Following the States Reorganisation Act (1956), the islands, which were earlier divided between the South Canara and Malabar districts of the Madras state, were organized into a separate union territory administered by the Government of India. The Laccadive, Minicoy, and Amindivi Islands were collectively renamed as the Lakshadweep islands on 1 November 1973. The headquarters of the union territory remained at Kozhikode until 1964, when the seat of the Administrator was shifted to Kavaratti. The territory has developed into a key Indian naval establishment due to its strategic location near vital shipping lanes from India to the Middle East.

== Geography ==
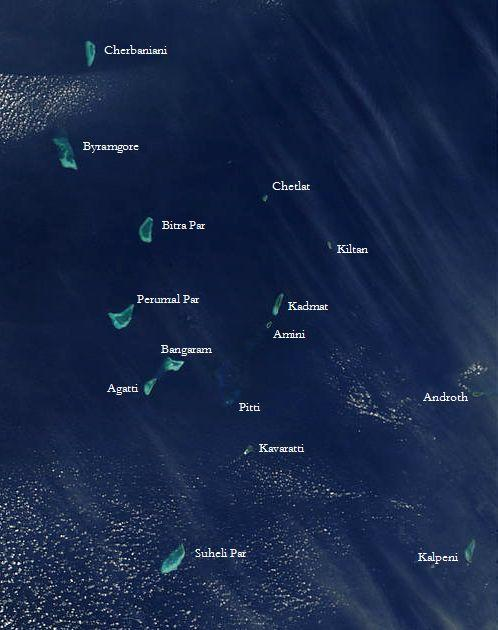
Satellite image showing the atolls of Lakshadweep, except Minicoy

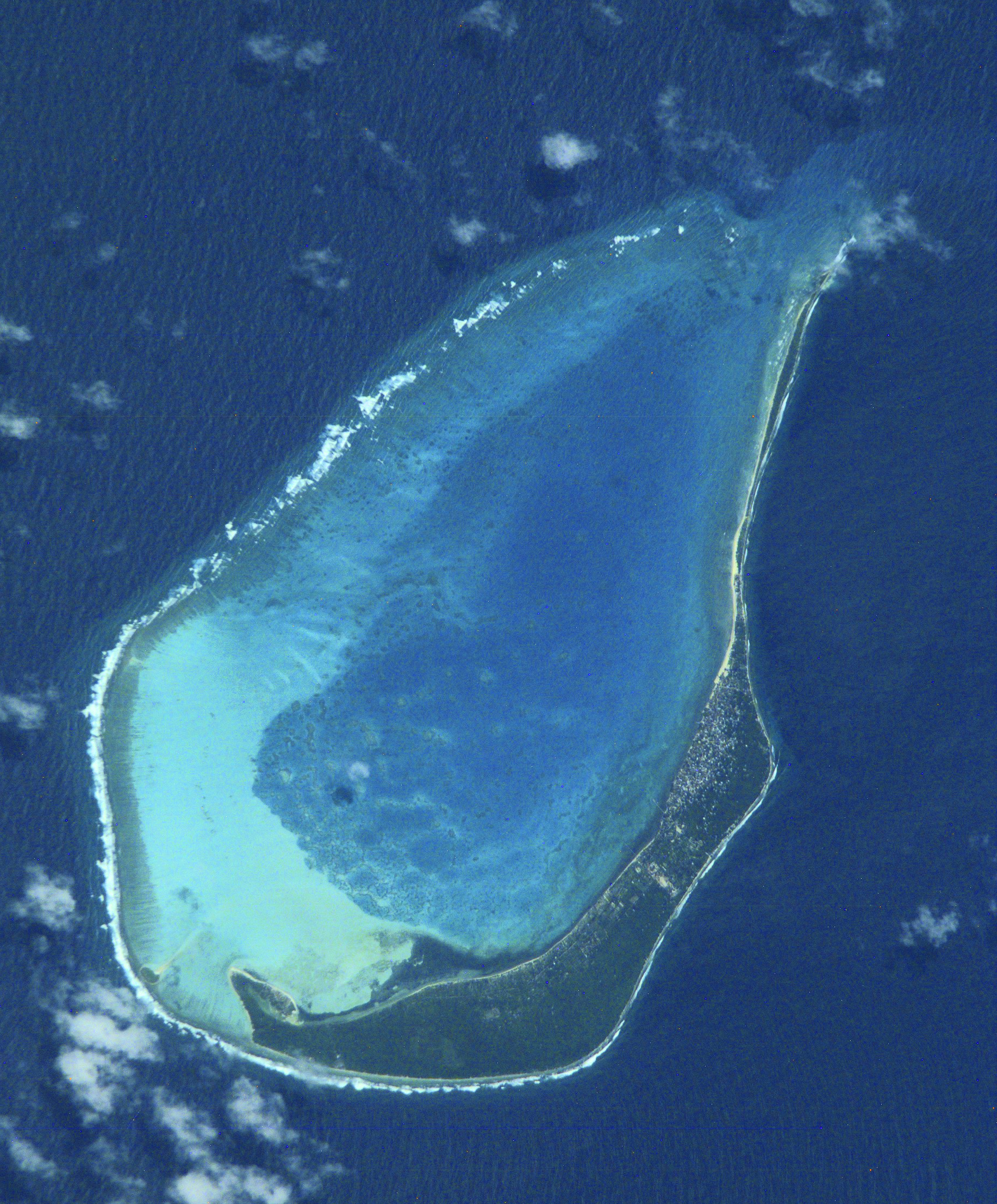
Image of Maliku Atoll with Minicoy island visible

Lakshadweep is an archipelago of 36 islands and islets that includes 12 atolls, three reefs, and five submerged banks. The islands occupy a total land area of approximately 32.62 km^{2} (12.59 sq mi) and only ten of the islands are inhabited. The islands are located between the Arabian Sea to the west and the Laccadive Sea to the east, about 220–440 km (140–270 mi) off the Malabar Coast of mainland India. The territory is divided into three island subgroups: the Amindivi islands in the north, the Laccadive islands in the East (separated from Amindivi by the 11th parallel north), and the atoll of Minicoy to the south of the Nine Degree Channel. The islands have a 132 km (82 mi) long coastline with a lagoon area of 4,200 km^{2} (1,600 sq mi), territorial waters of 20,000 km^{2} (7,700 sq mi), and an exclusive economic zone of 400,000 km^{2} (150,000 sq mi).

Lakshadweep is the northernmost island group of the exposed undersea mountain range, the Chagos-Lakshadweep Ridge. While there are no conclusive theories about the formation of the atolls, Charles Darwin proposed in 1842 CE that the subsidence of a volcanic island resulted in the formation of a fringing reef, which grew upwards with continual subsidence. The individual islands are small, with none of them measuring more than 1 mi (1.6 km) across. Most inhabited islands are situated on the eastern side of Lakshadweep and away from the low-lying lagoons to the West. The soil is generally sandy, derived from coral. According to a 2017 report, the Parali I island of Bangaram atoll has eroded and is completely inundated. Four other islands in the atoll also show various degrees of erosion: Parali II (80%), Thinnakara (14.4%), Parali III (11.4%), and Bangaram (9.9%).

=== Climate ===
The islands have a tropical monsoon climate, bordering on a tropical savanna climate. The weather is warm throughout the year with temperatures ranging from 20 to 32 degree Celsius. While tropical cyclones arising in the Arabian Sea rarely strike the islands due to its smaller size, winds and waves associated with them could alter the features of the islands considerably.

Climate data for Lakshadweep 1981–2010, extremes 1996–2012
Month	Jan	Feb	Mar	Apr	May	Jun	Jul	Aug	Sep	Oct	Nov	Dec	Year
Record high °C (°F)	35.3 (95.5)	35.3 (95.5)	38.0 (100.4)	37.8 (100.0)	37.0 (98.6)	37.8 (100.0)	32.7 (90.9)	34.8 (94.6)	33.3 (91.9)	35.0 (95.0)	35.0 (95.0)	36.3 (97.3)	38.0 (100.4)
Mean daily maximum °C (°F)	31.2 (88.2)	31.5 (88.7)	32.4 (90.3)	33.2 (91.8)	32.8 (91.0)	31.1 (88.0)	30.4 (86.7)	30.5 (86.9)	30.5 (86.9)	30.9 (87.6)	31.4 (88.5)	31.3 (88.3)	31.4 (88.5)
Mean daily minimum °C (°F)	25.8 (78.4)	26.0 (78.8)	27.0 (80.6)	28.1 (82.6)	27.6 (81.7)	25.9 (78.6)	25.7 (78.3)	25.8 (78.4)	25.8 (78.4)	26.1 (79.0)	26.1 (79.0)	25.9 (78.6)	26.3 (79.3)
Record low °C (°F)	22.5 (72.5)	23.5 (74.3)	24.2 (75.6)	23.2 (73.8)	22.1 (71.8)	22.3 (72.1)	22.7 (72.9)	22.5 (72.5)	22.7 (72.9)	22.2 (72.0)	22.1 (71.8)	22.8 (73.0)	22.1 (71.8)
Average rainfall mm (inches)	8.3 (0.33)	2.0 (0.08)	0.5 (0.02)	5.6 (0.22)	85.1 (3.35)	260.5 (10.26)	400.1 (15.75)	395.5 (15.57)	309.6 (12.19)	99.1 (3.90)	27.5 (1.08)	9.1 (0.36)	1,602.9 (63.11)
Average rainy days	2.1	0.9	0.1	0.4	6.5	16.0	16.1	12.5	10.0	9.3	5.5	2.4	79.5
Average relative humidity (%) (at 17:30 IST)	69	68	67	67	72	79	80	78	78	77	75	70	73
Source: India Meteorological Department

=== Flora and fauna ===
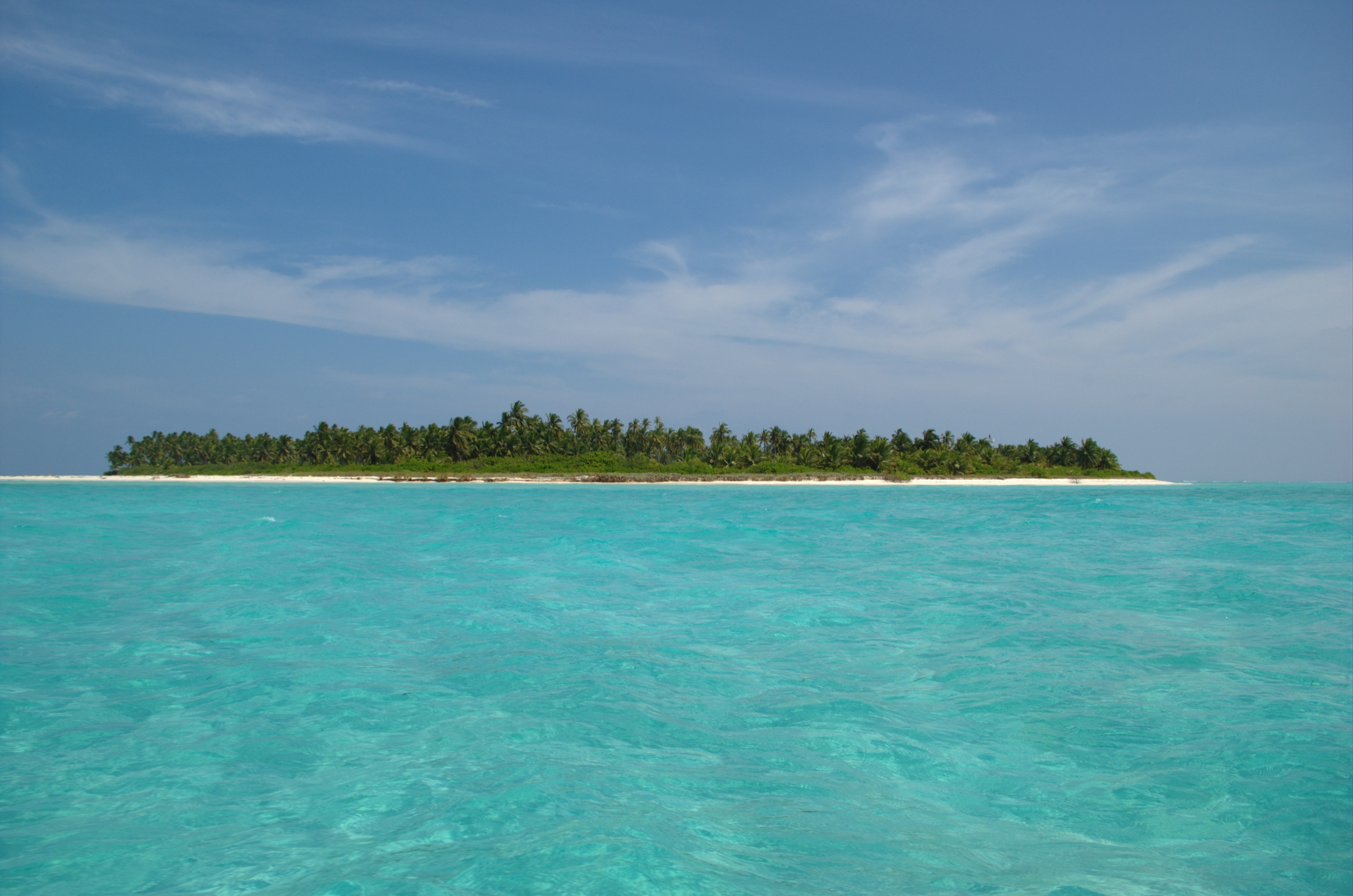
Bangaram Atoll, an uninhabited island, is covered with coconut palms

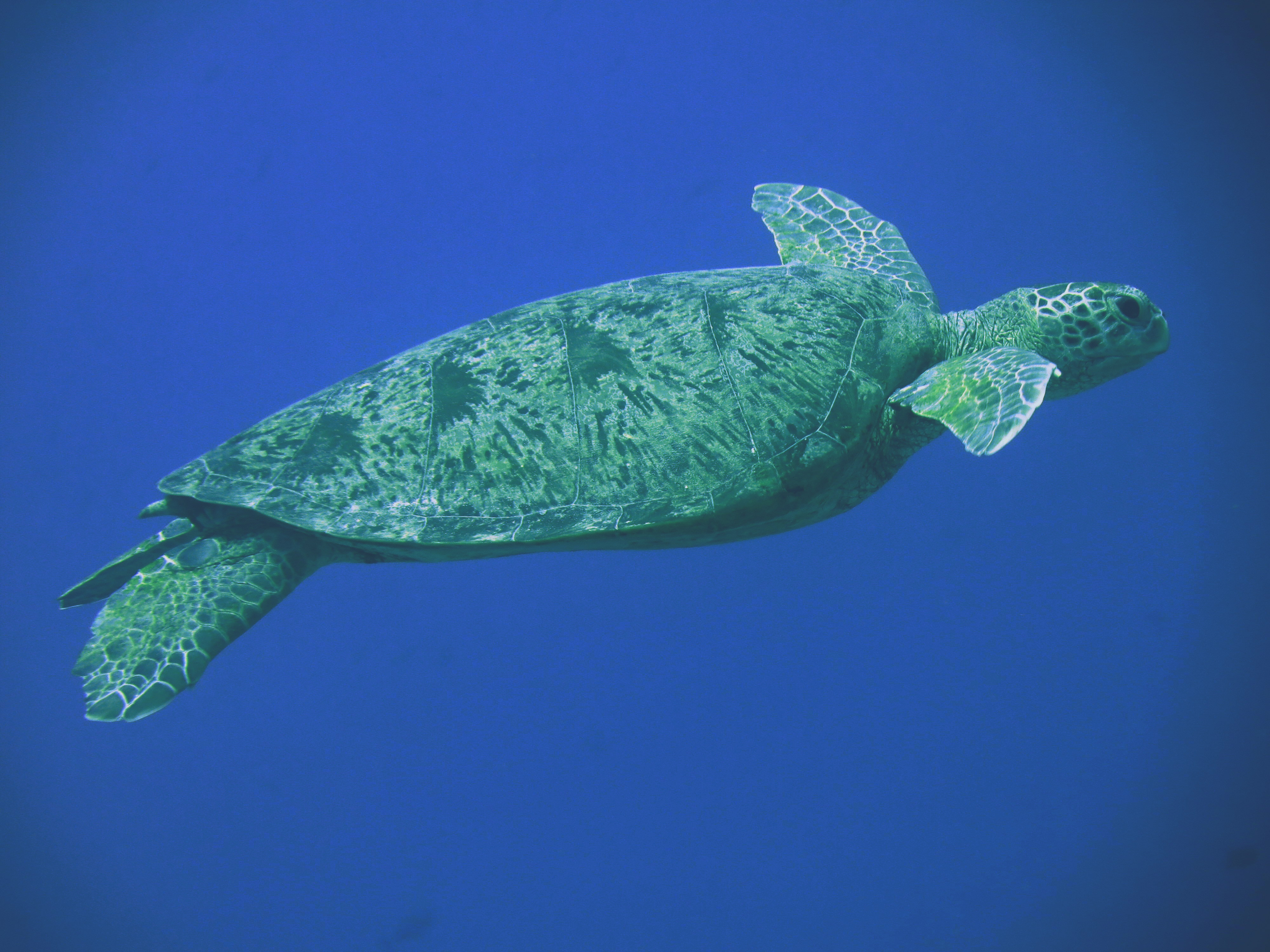
A Green turtle in the Laccadive Sea

Lakshadweep is part of the Maldives-Lakshadweep-Chagos Archipelago tropical moist forests ecoregion. There are no forests on the islands. Nearly 400 species of flowering plants have been documented, including three species of sea grasses Cymodocea isoetifolia, Syringodium isoetifolium and Thalassia hemprichii, other angiosperms such as Pandanus, Heliotropium foertherianum, Tournefortia argentea and Pemphis acidula, fungi, algae, and lichens. The common flora of the atolls include coconut groves and coastal shrubs such as Pemphis acidula, Cordia subcordata, Scaevola taccada, Thespesia populnea, Suriana maritima, Dodonaea viscosa, Guettarda speciosa, and seaweeds such as sea lettuces, Codium, and Hypena.

There are over 600 recorded species of marine fishes, 78 species of corals, 82 species of seaweed, 52 species of crabs, 2 species of lobsters, 48 species of gastropods, and 12 species of bivalves. It is one of the four coral reef regions in India.

Cetacean diversity off the Lakshadweep Islands and in adjacent areas include various whales (e.g., pygmy blue, Bryde's, sperm, orca, pilot whale), and dolphins. The commonly seen are introduced cattle and poultry. Other notable marine fauna include sharks, bonitos, tunas, snappers, flying fish, Manta rays, octopuses, crabs, and turtles. There are 101 species of birds, common amongst them include the brown noddy and sooty tern and water birds such as herons, teals, and gulls. Pitti island is a declared bird sanctuary and an important breeding place for sea turtles and a number of pelagic birds including the brown noddy, lesser crested tern, and greater crested tern.

Symbols of Lakshadweep
Animal	Butterfly fish (Chaetodon falcula)	Bird	Sooty tern (Sterna fuscata)
Tree	Bread fruit (Artocarpus incisa)	Flower	Neelakurinji (Strobilanthes kunthiana)

== Administration and politics ==
Map of Lakshadweep

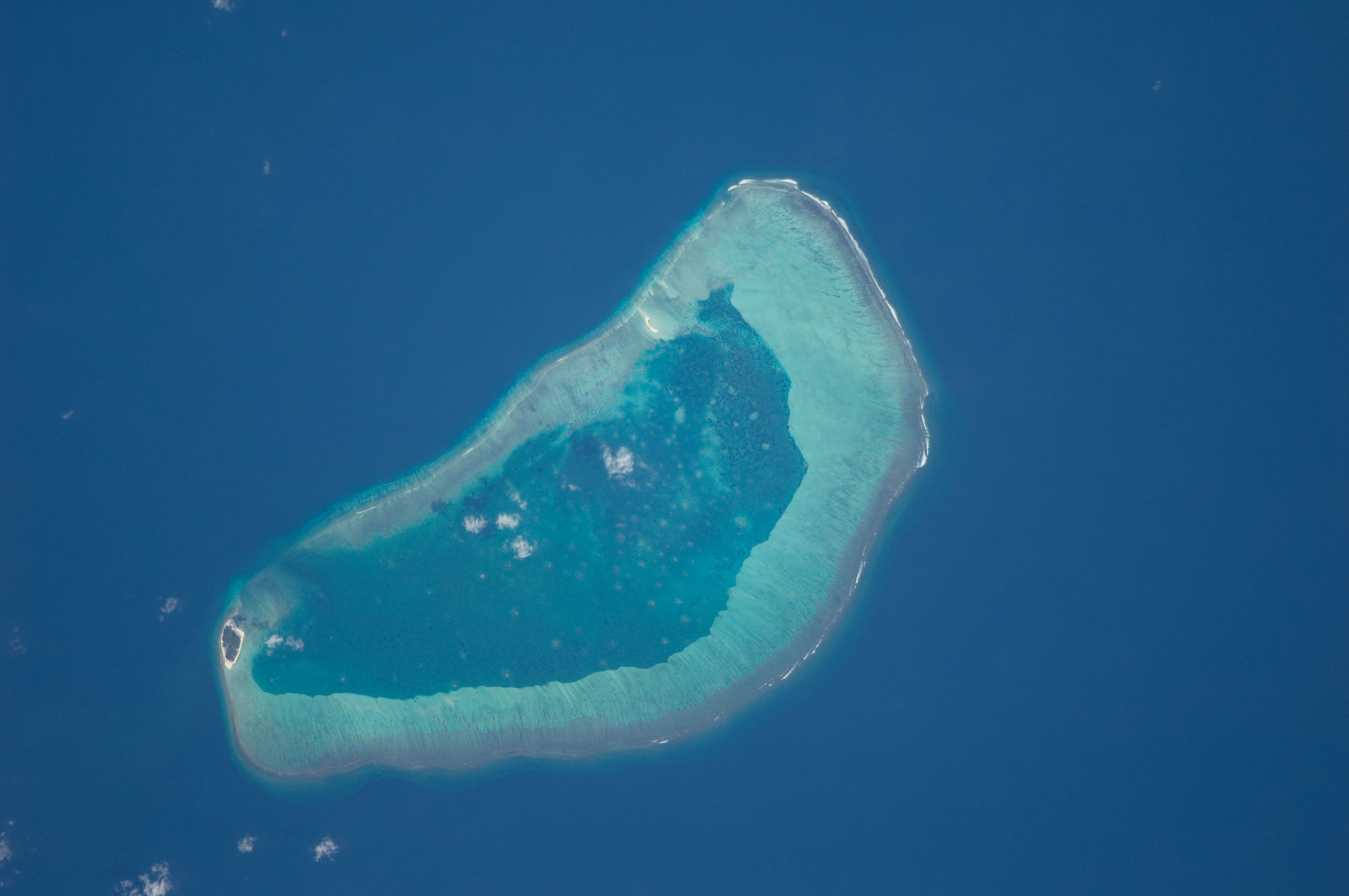
Bitra Island

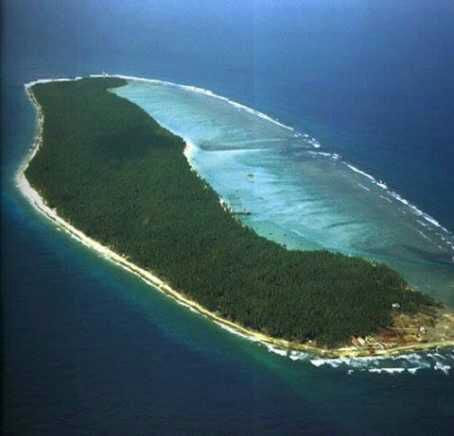
Kadmat Island

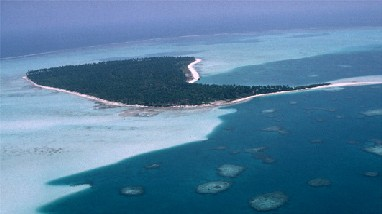
Kavaratti Island

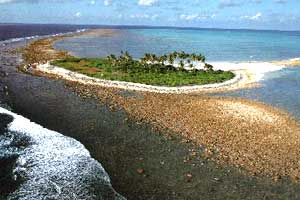
Viringili Island

Lakshadweep is a union territory and is governed by an administrator on behalf of the Government of India. It was established in 1956. The headquarters of the union territory was at Kozhikode, Kerala until 1964, when the seat of the administrator of the islands was shifted to Kavaratti. Since then, the administration secretariat is based in Kavaratti. The islands constitutes a single Indian district. The district collector is in charge of revenue, land settlement and law and order.

The territory is divided into ten administrative sub-divisions headed by sub-divisional officers, except the Minicoy and Agatti islands, which are headed by deputy collectors. The ten inhabited islands have village panchayats consisting of a total of 88 members across islands. These panchayats are combined to form a district panchayat, which has 26 elected members including the chairpersons of the ten village panchayats and the Member of Parliament for Lakshadweep Lok Sabha Constituency. The territory is also divided into five community development blocks: Kavaratti, Amini, Andrott, Minicoy and Kiltan, each administered by block development officers.

The district collector also serves as the district magistrate and development commissioner, and is assisted by an additional district magistrate and ten executive magistrates for enforcement of law and order. The administrator acts as the Inspector General of Police and has command and control of the Lakshadweep Police, which has a sanctioned strength of 349 personnel across nine police stations. The union territory falls under the judicial jurisdiction of the Kerala High Court at Kochi, and has a system of lower courts under its authority. There is a district and sessions court in Kavaratti (established in 1997) and two munsiff courts in Andrott and Amini islands.

The territory elects one member to the lower house of the Indian parliament, the Lok Sabha. Lakshadweep is a reserved constituency for Scheduled Tribes. The constituency is currently represented by Muhammed Hamdulla Sayeed of the Indian National Congress.

List of islands of Lakshadweep
Name	Sub-division	Area (km^{2})	Population (2011)
Aminidivi
Bitra	Bitra	0.10	271
Chetlat	Chetlat	1.174	2,347
Kiltan	Kiltan	1.7	3,946
Kadmat	Kadmat	3.34	5,404
Amini	Amini	2.67	7,661
Laccadive
Andrott	Andrott	4.9	11,191
Agatti	Agatti	3.84	7,556
Kalpati	Agatti	0.085	–
Bangaram	Agatti	0.57	– (Note: Bangaram island has a floating population)
Thinnakkara	Agatti	0.522	–
Parali I	Agatti	0.089	–
Parali II	Agatti	0.089	–
Parali III	Agatti	0.089	–
Kavaratti	Kavaratti	4.22	11,221
Pakshipitti	Kavaratti	0.001	–
Valiyakara	Kavaratti	0.395	–
Cheriyakara	Kavaratti	0.383	–
Kalpeni	Kalpeni	2.79	4,419
Pitti I	Kalpeni	0.028	–
Pitti II	Kalpeni	0.028	–
Cheriyam	Kalpeni	0.537	–
Kodithala	Kalpeni	0.0027	–
Thilakam I	Kalpeni	0.055	–
Thilakam II	Kalpeni	0.055	–
Thilakam III	Kalpeni	0.055	–
Minicoy
Minicoy	Minicoy	4.801	10,447
Viringili	Minicoy	0.025	–
Total		32.69 (Note: the sum of area of individual islands does not add up to the total area, as there are other smaller islets, reefs and banks which form part of the archipelago)	64,473

== Demographics ==
According to the 2011 census, Lakshadweep has a population of 64,473, consisting of 33,123 (51.3%) males and 31,350 (48.7%) females, and had a sex ratio of 946 females per 1,000 males in 2011. It also recorded the highest sex ratio at birth amongst Indian territories as per the National Family Health Survey (NFHS) in 2021. As per the 2011 census, there were a total of 11,574 households and about 50,332 (78%) of the population lived in urban areas. As per the NSO survey in 2017, the literacy rate was 92.28%, the second highest amongst all Indian territories. As per the NFHS, the fertility rate was 1.4, significantly below the national average of 2.0.

=== Religion and ethnicity ===
Religion in Lakshadweep (2011)
Religion	Percent
Islam	96.58%
Hinduism	2.77%
Christianity	0.49%
Others	0.16%

Islam (96.6%) is the major religion of people of the islands with Sunni Islam being the predominant denomination, followed by Hinduism (2.8%) and Christianity (0.5%). Most settlers of the islands are descendants of migrants from the Malabar coast of Southwest India and are ethnically similar to the Mappilas of Kerala. According to local tradition, Islam was brought to the islands by Ubaidullah in 661 CE. Although Islam is the predominant religion currently, the earliest settlers were probably Hindus, evidenced by the current social stratification and matrilineal kinship system in Lakshadweep. The southernmost island of Minicoy is populated by the Mahls, an ethnic group also resident in the Maldives.

=== Languages ===
Languages of Lakshadweep (2011)
Language	Percent
Malayalam (Jeseri)	84.17%
Dhivehi (Mahl)	14.44%
Others	1.39%

English is the official language of the union territory. Jeseri (also known as Dweep Basha), a dialect of Malayalam, is widely spoken language in the Amindivi and Laccadive islands. Mahl, a dialect of Dhivehi, is spoken in Minicoy. There are minor variations of the same dialect across islands.

Malayalam, written in the Malayalam script, was introduced as the primary language of Lakshadweep during the British Raj. This policy has been continued since independence, with Malayalam serving as a link language on all islands, including Minicoy. Previously, a type of Arabic script, known as the Ponnani or Arabi Malayalam script, was used as the writing system.

== Economy ==
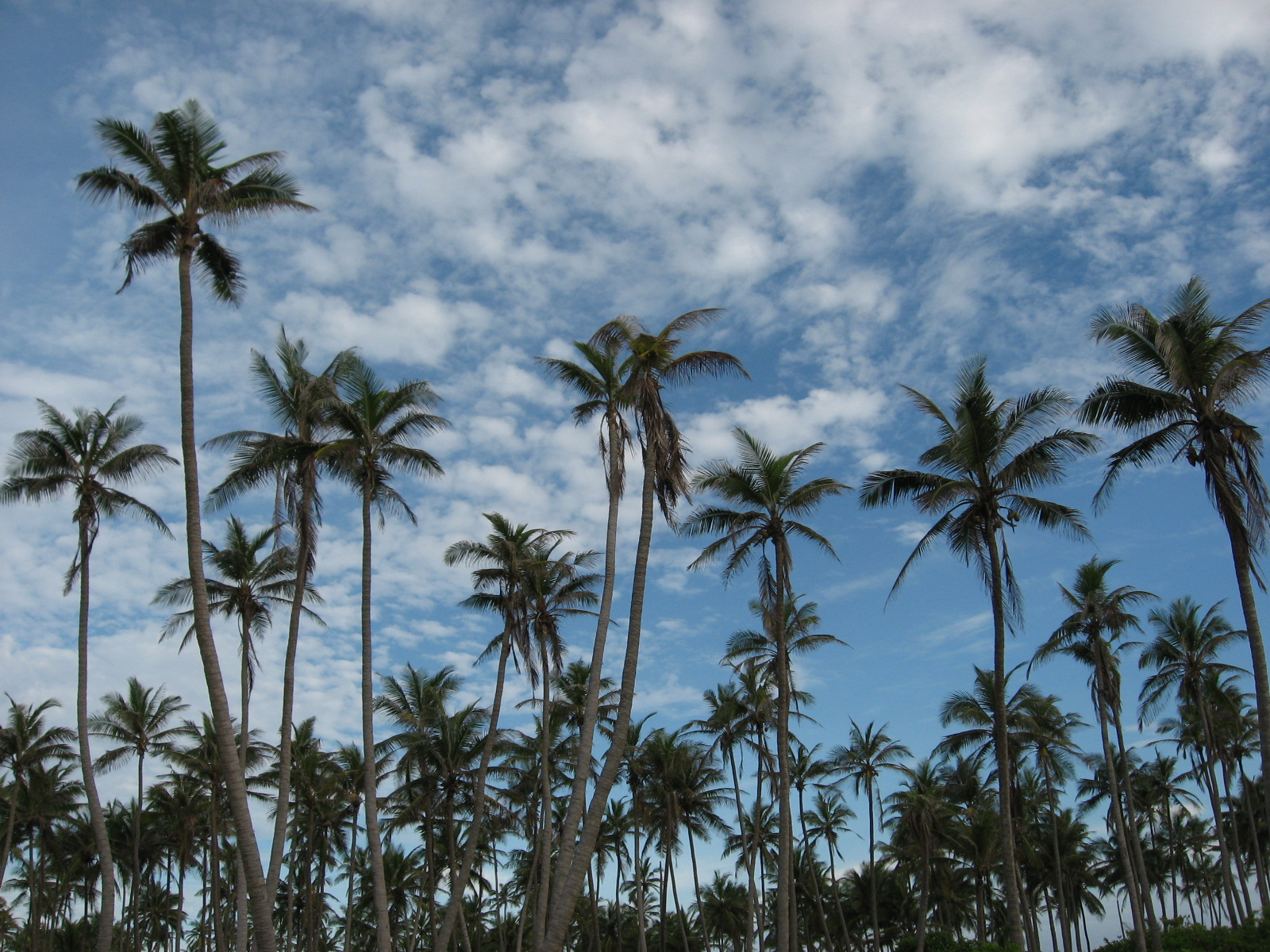
Coconut palms on the islands are commercially important

The economy is dependent on agriculture, fishery, and tourism. As of 2013, there were 72 registered micro and small industries majorly involved in the public sector, and the manufacture of food products and furniture. With a minimal arable land of 2.58 hectares, the only major agriculture produce is coconuts. While rice and other crops were cultivated earlier in low-lying water logged lands called "thottams", it was discontinued due to ecological limitations. The major exports are coconut products such as coir and fishes. The government runs five coir factories, five production demonstration centers, and seven curling units that produce coir fiber, yarn and mats.

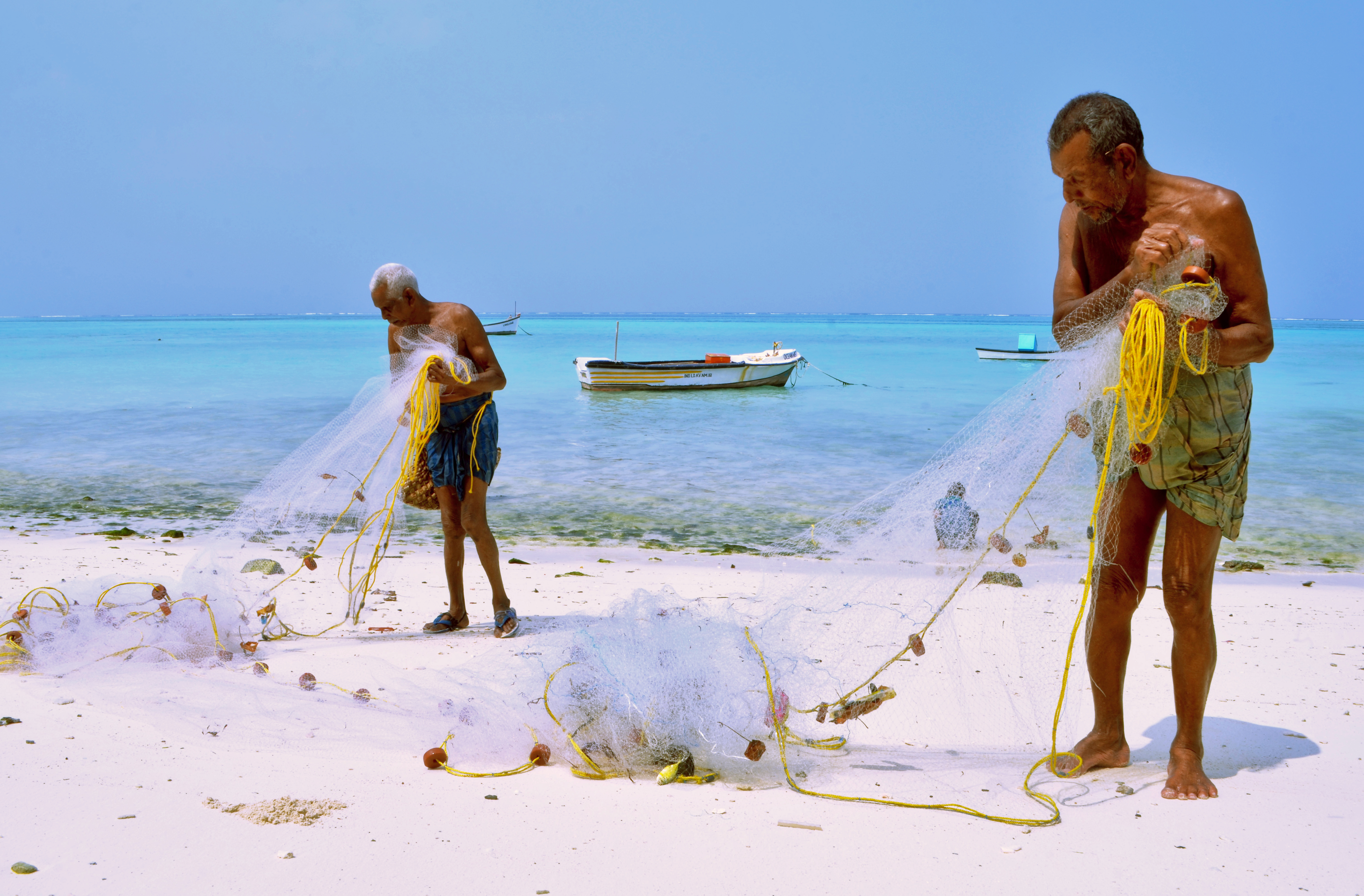
Fishermen on the beach at Kavaratti

With a vast lagoon area and an exclusive economic zone of 400,000 km^{2} (150,000 sq mi), fishing is a major industry. The estimated annual production is 21,016 tonnes of which 60% is tuna and related fishes. About 60% of the total production is converted to dried products and 40% is allocated for local consumption. Commercial fishing is concentrated around 11 islands with skipjack tuna and yellowfin tuna being the only commercial varieties. The government runs a tuna canning factory in the islands. Fishing is carried out using mechanized fishing boats, traditional country crafts, and country crafts fitted with outboard motors.

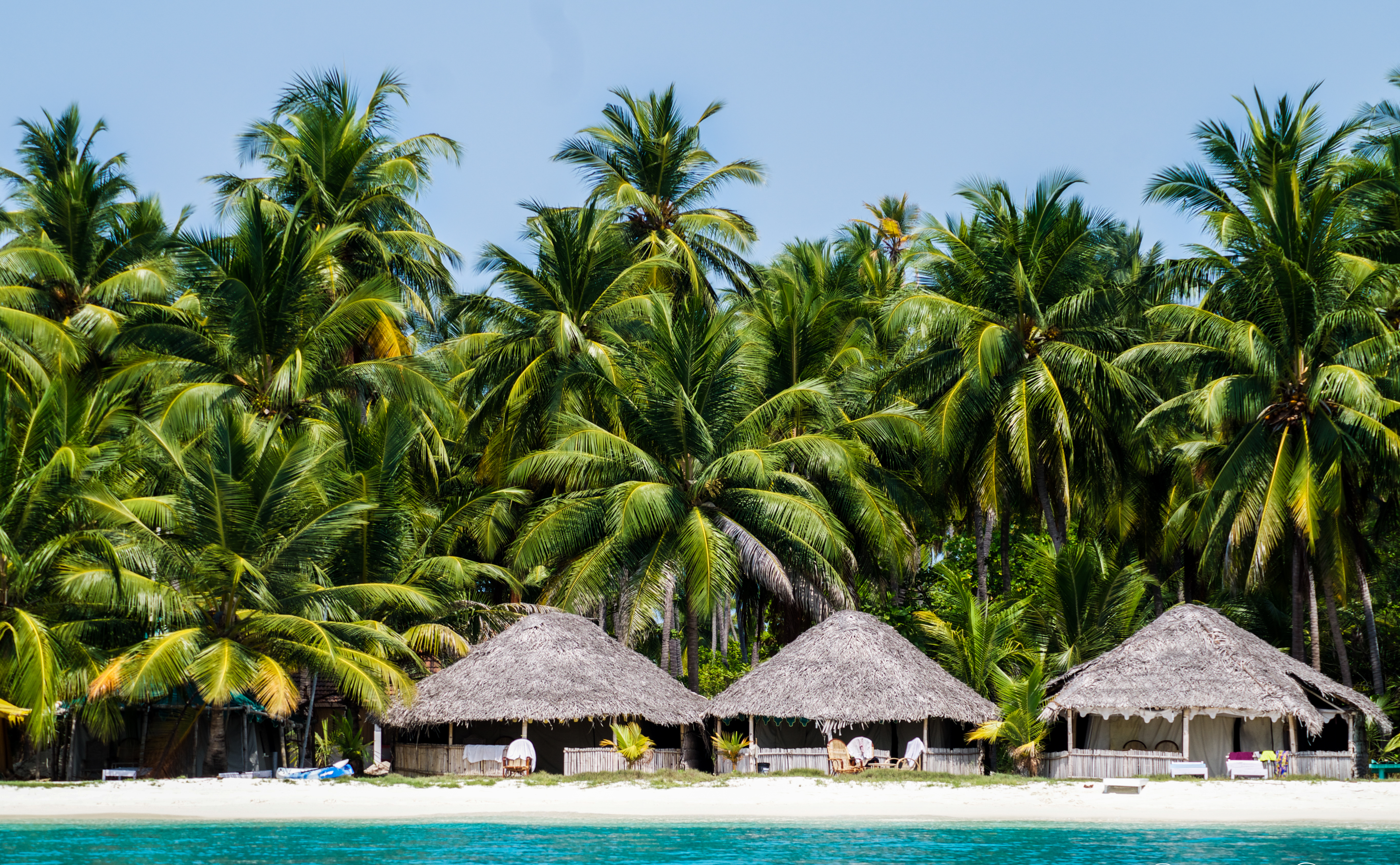
Bangaram Atoll is being promoted as a tourist destination

Tourism in Lakshadweep began in 1974, when the Bangaram atoll was opened for international tourism. According to government statistics, 10,435 domestic tourists and 1,313 foreign tourists visited the islands in 2018. The government is promoting tourism as a means to increase the income of the local population, with Bangaram and Kadmat islands being promoted as potential tourist destinations. To promote tourism, activities such as scuba diving, wind surfing, snorkelling, surfing, kayaking, canoeing, water skiing, sportfishing, yachting and night sea voyages have been established. Tourists require permission to visit Lakshadweep and foreign nationals are not permitted to visit certain islands. According to the current alcohol laws of India, alcoholic beverage consumption is not permitted on the islands, except on Bangaram. In 2024, the government proposed further programmes to improve infrastructure and promote tourism. The potential negative effects of tourism on the environment and ecosystem of the islands are a subject of debate.

== Infrastructure ==
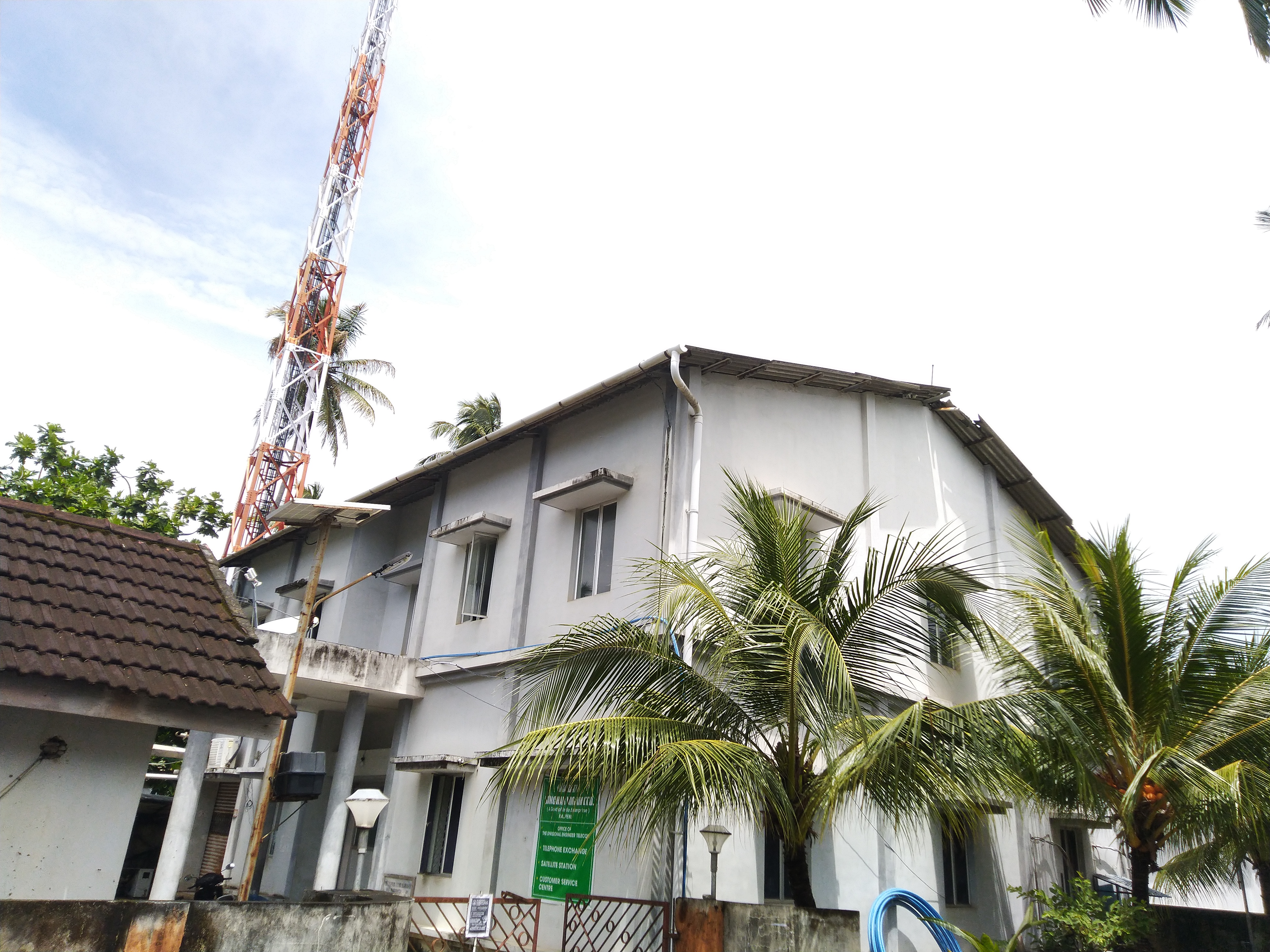
There is limited mobile communication in the islands. Pictured is the office of state-owned BSNL in Kalpeni

There is no single power grid that connects Lakshadweep; independent power houses cater to the power requirements of the islands. Minicoy was the first island to be electrified in 1962, followed by Kavaratti in 1964 and others later, with Bitra being the last island to be electrified in 1982. Two diesel generators were established in 1962, which generate about 51.6 Kilo Watts of power. As of 2012, the islands have 41 diesel generators and 12 solar photovoltaic systems with a total installed capacity of 18.5 Mega Watts. In January 2024, a solar power plant was commissioned to augment the power generation capacity.

The world's first ever experimental low-temperature thermal desalination plant opened in Kavaratti in 2005, with a projected daily production capacity of 100,000 litres of potable water from seawater. The plant utilises the temperature difference between warm surface seawater and much colder seawater at about 500 m (1,600 ft) depth to generate potable water as well as energy. The technology was developed at the National Institute of Ocean Technology and the government has announced plans to build three more such plants.

Mobile communication service is provided by state-owned BSNL across all inhabited islands and Airtel in Kavratti and Agatti islands. In 2020, the government announced a project to install under-sea fiber optic cable for high-speed mobile and internet connectivity between Kochi and 11 islands of Lakshadweep, which was inaugurated in January 2024. Post offices run by India Post provide mail service.

Lakshadweep is served by four hospitals with 200 beds, four primary health centers, and 14 sub-health centers operated by the government.

== Transportation ==
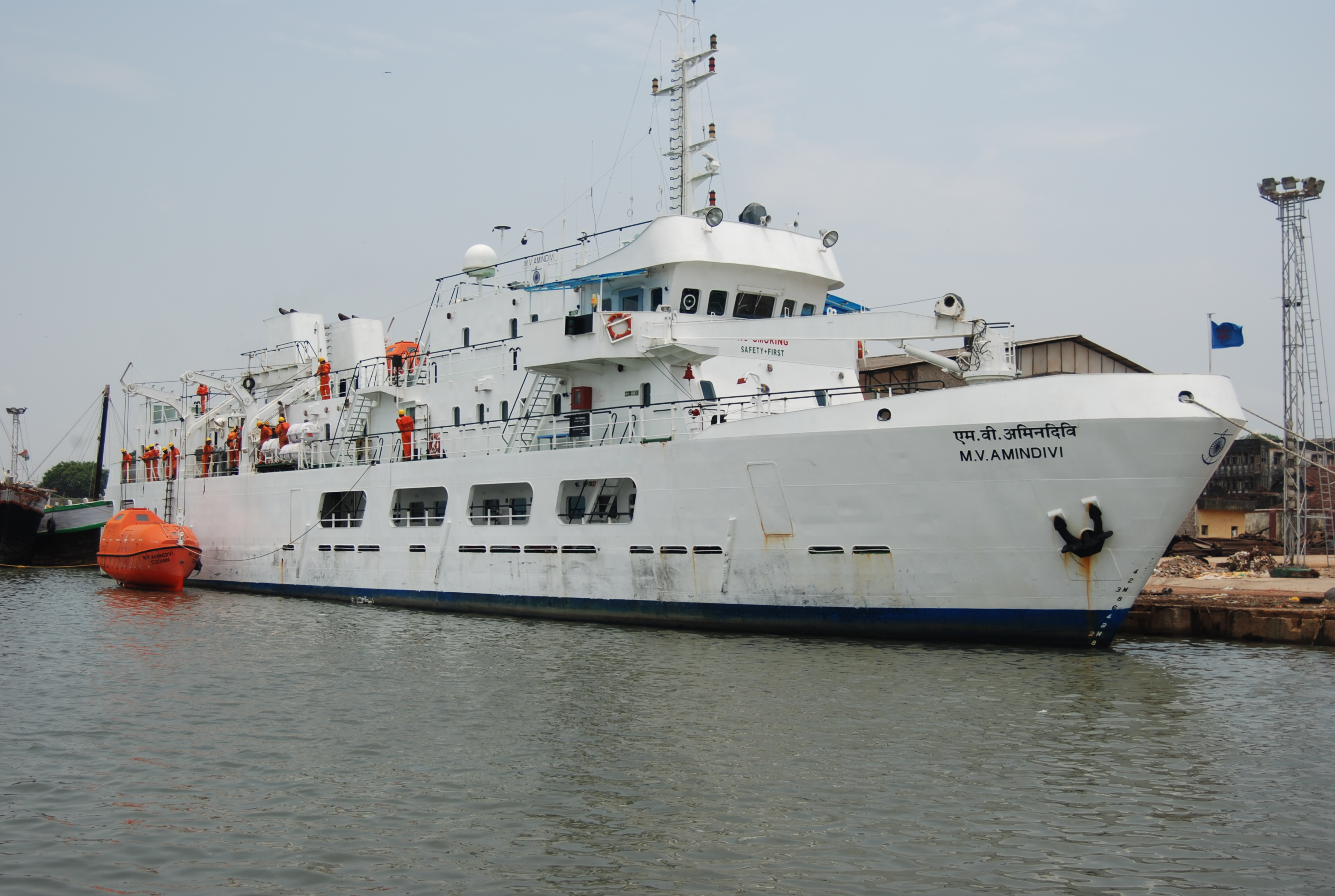
Passenger ship MV Amindivi

The only airport in the territory is Agatti Airport on Agatti Island. The 1.2 km (0.75 mi) runway is capable of serving small turboprop aircraft. The government announced a plan in early 2024 to extend the runway to enable it to handle larger narrow body aircraft and expand the infrastructure to convert the airport into dual-use for civilian and military purposes. The construction of a greenfield airport at Minicoy Island was also proposed. Two helicopters are presently operated by Pawan Hans and are utilised for passenger transport and emergency medical evacuation from the islands.

As of 2019, there are 228 km (142 mi) of paved roads and no railway in the territory. Additional roads have been planned, including a peripheral road at Kavaratti and beach front roads at Kadamath and Agatti islands.

As of 2023, seven ships operate passenger services between Kochi and the islands, with seasonal boat/ferry services available between islands. In 2024, the government unveiled a plan to develop three ports at Androth, Kalpeni and Kadamath islands as a part of the Sagar Mala project. The ten inhabited island each have a minor port. There are fifteen lighthouses on the islands, with the Minicoy Island Lighthouse (built in 1885) being the first modern lighthouse.

The Indian Navy operates the INS Dweeprakshak naval base under the Southern Naval Command, commissioned in 2012.

== Education ==
The first public school was opened in Amini in 1904, followed by the establishment of elementary schools at Kiltan in 1911 and Kadmat in 1925. The first high schools were established in the 1960s in Amini and Kalpeni. As of 2023, there are 50 schools catering to 8,350 students. There are four government colleges affiliated to Pondicherry University and two colleges and three university centers affiliated to Calicut University in the territory.

== See also ==
- Coral reefs in India
- Andaman and Nicobar Islands
