= Amini, India =

Census town in the Union Territory of Lakshadweep, India

Amini
- Location within India

Geography
- Location: Arabian Sea
- Coordinates: 11.123°N 72.724°E
- Archipelago: Lakshadweep
- Adjacent to: Indian Ocean
- Total islands: 1
- Major islands: Amini
- Area: 2.71 km^{2} (1.05 sq mi)
- Length: 2.8 km (1.74 mi)
- Width: 1.3 km (0.81 mi)
- Coastline: 7 km (4.3 mi)
- Highest elevation: 2 m (7 ft)

Administration
- India
- Territory: Union territory of Lakshadweep
- District: Lakshadweep
- Island group: Aminidivi
- Tehsils of India: Aminidivi
- Subdivisions of India: Amini Island
- Largest settlement: Amini (pop. 6500)

Demographics
- Population: 7843 (2014)
- Pop. density: 2,895/km^{2} (7498/sq mi)
- Ethnic groups: Malayali, Mahls

Additional information
- Time zone: IST (UTC+5:30)
- PIN: 682552
- Telephone code: 04891
- ISO code: IN-LD-00
- Official website: www.lakshadweep.gov.in
- Literacy: 71%
- Avg. summer temperature: 32.0 °C (89.6 °F)
- Avg. winter temperature: 28.0 °C (82.4 °F)
- Sex ratio: 0.9948♂/♀

Amini is a census town in the Union Territory of Lakshadweep, India. It is also the name of the island where the town stands and of the atoll that contains that island. It lies 407 km (253 mi) west of the city of Kochi.

== History ==
Amini Island was one of the first islands in the archipelago to be inhabited. The artisans on this island are known for making walking sticks out of coconut shells and tortoise shells as well as carved stone and coral motifs.

== Geography ==
The channel between Amini Island and Cardamom Island is safe and deep, but depths of less than 10 meters project 0.5 mile south from the south tip of the reefs surrounding Cardamom Island. Amini Island Light is shown on the south point of the island. Amini Island, the most important of the Amindivi Islands, is oval, with the long axis oriented northeast–southwest. It is 2.8 km long and up to 1.3 km wide, yielding a land area of 2.71 km^{2} (1.05 sq mi). It is fringed by a reef 0.3 to 0.6 km wide.

=== Demographics ===
Amini village is in the middle of the west coast of the Island. A raised stone platform jetty, with steps leading to the beach, is in front of the village. There is a post office and a hospital at the village. The small village of Hujrapali is on the east coast. As of the 2011 India census, the island of Amini had a population of 7,657. Males constitute 50% of the population and females 50%. Amini has an average literacy rate of 71%, higher than the national average of 59.5%, with 55% of the males and 45% of females literate. 15% of the population is under 6 years of age.

== Pitti Bank ==
Amini Island lies at the northeastern extremity of Pitti Bank, 42 km from the small, uninhabited Pitti Island (not to be confused with Pitti Islet of Kalpeni Atoll), which is located at the opposite southwestern extremity of the bank. Pitti Bank, also oriented along a northeast–southwest axis, is 49 km long, in the northern part from 2 to 7 km wide and in the southern part up to 18 km wide. Pitti Bank may be considered a largely submerged and sunken atoll, with an estimated lagoon area of 415 km^{2} (160 sq mi), with just the two islands Amini and Pitti remaining at its opposite ends. Kadmat island, although just 5 km northeast of Amini Island, is separated from it by a deep channel and thus forms a separate geographical unit.

== Administration ==
The bank belongs to the township of Amini Island of Aminidivi Tehsil.

== Image gallery ==
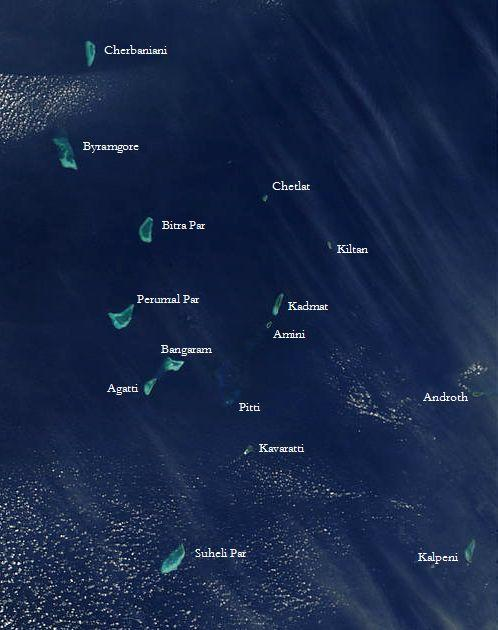
Satellite picture showing the atolls of the Lakshadweep except for Minicoy

Map
