= List of airports in Lakshadweep =

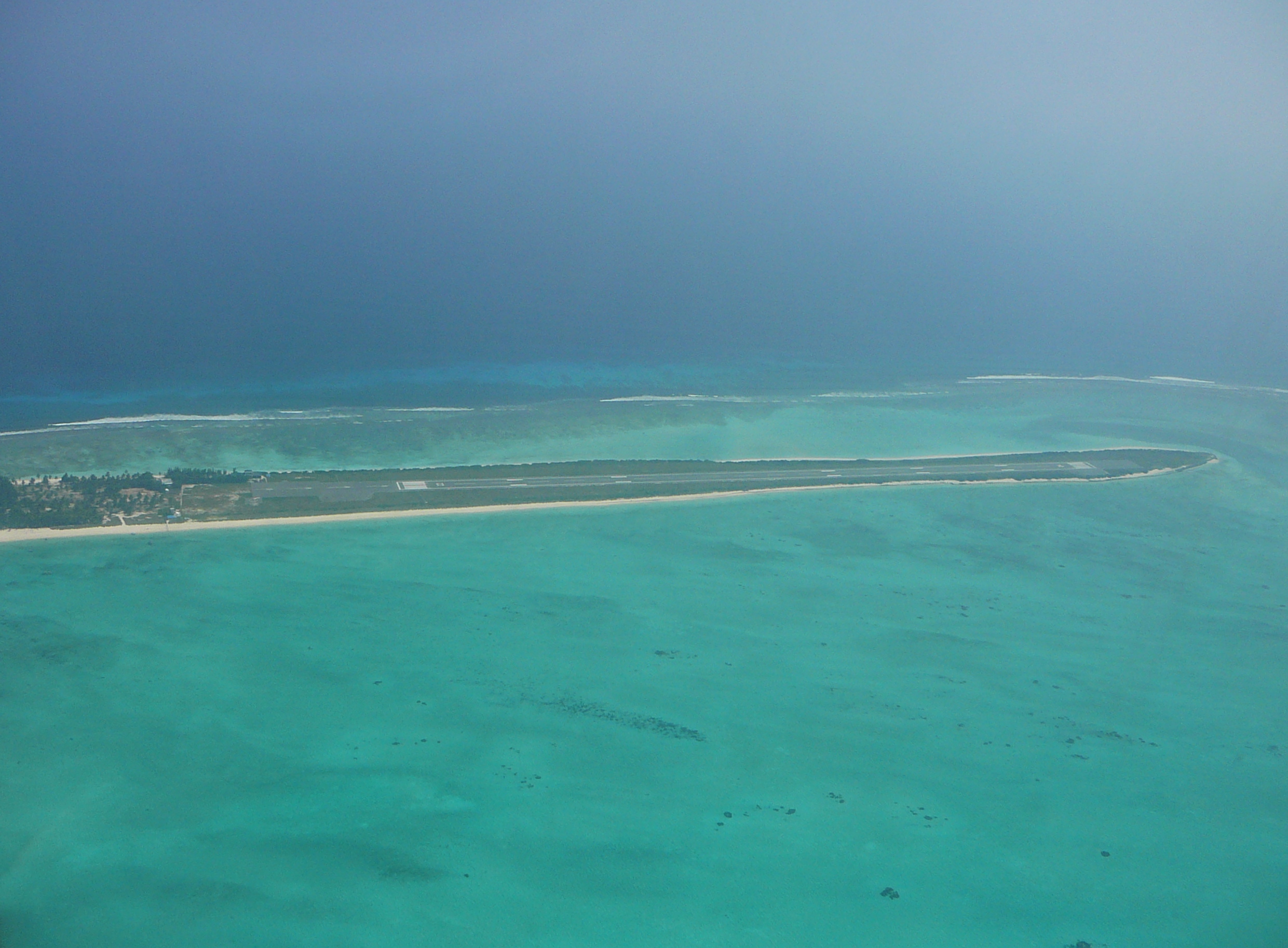
Agatti Airport

The Indian union territory of Lakshadweep has only one operational airport named Agatti Airport on the island of Agatti. Under the Government of India's UDAN scheme, the Agatti Airport is proposed to be expanded. Also, two water aerodromes at Minicoy and Kavaratti are proposed to be developed for tourism purposes. There is a proposal to build an airstrip at Minicoy for commercial and defence purposes. The Government of India has planned to build a joint airport both for military and civilian purposes at Minicoy Island.

== List ==
The list includes the airports in Lakshadweep with their respective ICAO and IATA codes.

List of airports in Lakshadweep
Sl. no.	Location in Lakshadweep	Airport name	ICAO	IATA	Operator	Category	Role
1	Agatti	Agatti Airport	VOAT	AGX	Airports Authority of India	Domestic	Commercial
2	Minicoy	Minicoy Airport	—	—	Not Confirmed	Domestic (Planned)	Commercial/Military
