= Kalpati =

Island in Lakshadweep, India

Kalpatti Island
- Location within India

Geography
- Location: Arabian Sea
- Coordinates: 10.813°N 72.167°E
- Archipelago: Lakshadweep
- Adjacent to: Indian Ocean
- Total islands: 1
- Major islands: Kalpatti
- Area: 0.085 km^{2} (0.033 sq mi)
- Length: 0.4 km (0.25 mi)
- Width: 0.25 km (0.155 mi)
- Coastline: 1.5 km (0.93 mi)
- Highest elevation: 1 m (3 ft)

Administration
- India
- Territory: Union territory of Lakshadweep
- District: Lakshadweep
- Island group: Laccadive Islands
- Tehsils of India: Kavaratti
- Subdivisions of India: Agatti Island
- Largest settlement: (None)

Demographics
- Population: 0 (2017)
- Pop. density: 0/km^{2} (0/sq mi)
- Ethnic groups: (None)

Additional information
- Time zone: IST (UTC+5:30)
- PIN: 68255x
- Telephone code: 0489x
- ISO code: IN-LD-06
- Official website: www.lakshadweep.gov.in
- Avg. summer temperature: 32.0 °C (89.6 °F)
- Avg. winter temperature: 28.0 °C (82.4 °F)
- Sex ratio: 0♂/♀

Kalpatti Island is an uninhabited island of Agatti atoll in Lakshadweep, India. There were plans to extend the runway of the airport on the nearby Agatti Island to Kalpati Island to accommodate jet aircraft. The plans were rejected on environmental grounds because the proposed runway extension would have passed a turtle colony.

== Administration ==
The island belongs to the township of Agatti Island of Kavaratti Tehsil.

== Image gallery ==
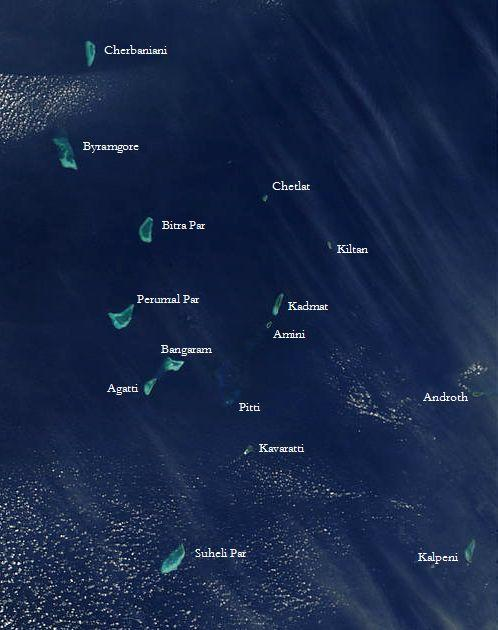
Satellite picture showing the atolls of the Lakshadweep except for Minicoy

Map

== See also ==
- Agatti Aerodrome
