= Bangaram Atoll =

Atoll in the Union Territory of Lakshadweep, India

- Location within India

Geography
- Location: Arabian Sea
- Coordinates: 10.95°N 72.29°E
- Type: Atoll
- Archipelago: Lakshadweep
- Adjacent to: Indian Ocean
- Total islands: 6
- Major islands: Bangaram; Thinnakara; Pirli 1; Pirli 2; Pirli 3; South Bangaram
- Area: 1.234 km^{2} (0.476 sq mi)
- Length: 1.22 km (0.758 mi)
- Width: 0.7 km (0.43 mi)
- Coastline: 3.9 km (2.42 mi)
- Highest elevation: 1 m (3 ft)

Administration
- India
- Territory: Union territory of Lakshadweep
- District: Lakshadweep
- Island group: Laccadive Islands
- Tehsils of India: Kavaratti
- Subdivisions of India: Agatti Island
- Largest settlement: Thinnakara (pop. 30)

Demographics
- Population: 40 (2014)
- Pop. density: 32/km^{2} (83/sq mi)
- Ethnic groups: Malayali, Mahls

Additional information
- Time zone: IST (UTC+5:30)
- PIN: 68255x
- Telephone code: 04896
- ISO code: IN-LD-06
- Official website: www.lakshadweep.gov.in

Bangaram is an atoll in the Union Territory of Lakshadweep, India.

== Geography ==
The roughly rectangular atoll is 8.1 km in length with a maximum width of 4.2 km and with a lagoon area of 36 km^{2} (14 sq mi). It is located over 352 km (219 mi) off Kannur, 382 km (237 mi) off Kozhikode, 400 km (250 mi) off Kochi, and 525 km (326 mi) from Kollam Port in the Indian Ocean.

Bangaram atoll is about 7 km (4.3 mi) northeast of the island of Agatti and 25 km (16 mi) to the southeast of Perumal Par, in the western Lakshadweep archipelago at 10°56′N 72°17′E. Bangaram atoll is connected to the reef of Agatti through a shallow submarine ridge.

=== Islands ===
- Bangaram Island, the largest island in the atoll, with a land surface of 0.623 km^{2} (0.241 sq mi), is located at 10.94°N 72.286°E. There is a long brackish pond in the center of the island fringed by screwpine and coconut palms.
- South Bangaram Cay, the smallest island in the atoll, with a land surface of 0.001 km^{2} (0.00039 sq mi) is located at 10.933°N 72.278°E. It is a small sand cay.
- Thinnakara, another large island in the atoll, has a land surface of 0.522 km^{2} (0.202 sq mi) . It is located 1.5 miles (2.4 km) East-Northeast of Bangaram island, at the edge of the lagoon basin 10.945°N 72.315°E.
- Parali 1, Parali 2 and Parali 3 are three small islets at the eastern fringe of the reef 10.955°N 72.33°E. The Islets have a total land surface of 0.089 km^{2} (0.034 sq mi) Parali 1 was washed away in 2017.

== Demographics ==
Bangaram Island, the main island in the atoll, has a small population of 10. Bangaram Island Resort was located on the east coast of this island. Thinnakara, has a construction camp (~30) for the new resort being built on its west coast.

== Administration ==
The island belongs to the township of Agatti Island of Kavaratti Tehsil.

== Tourism ==
The Bangaram Island Beach Resort opened to tourism in 1974, but the lack of commercial flights made access difficult. Tourism took off after the Agatti Aerodrome on the nearby Agatti island was commissioned and regular commercial flights from Kochi were established. The resort had 60 cottages. Current alcohol regulations in Lakshadweep allow consumption of alcoholic drinks only on Bangaram Atoll.

The new Thinnakara is owned by locals from Agatti. It will offer numerous adventure activities, including scuba diving, snorkelling, deep sea fishing beside white sand beaches, a calm lagoon and a sparkling, clear coral reef.

== Flora and fauna ==
The Atoll is popular for its serene setting. Numerous species of tropical birds are found on the island.

== Image gallery ==
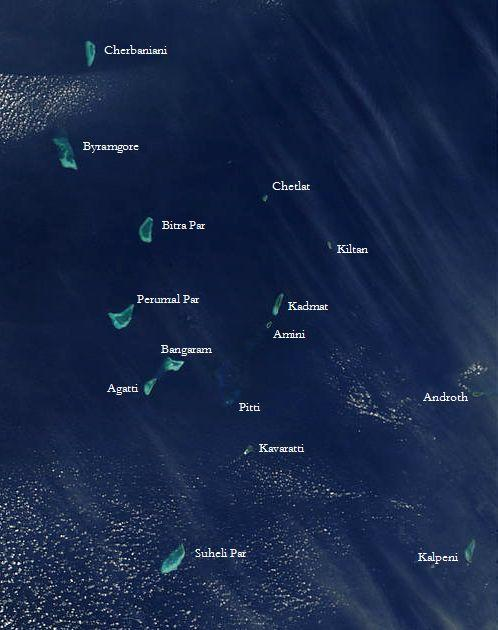
Satellite picture showing the atolls of the Lakshadweep except for Minicoy

Map

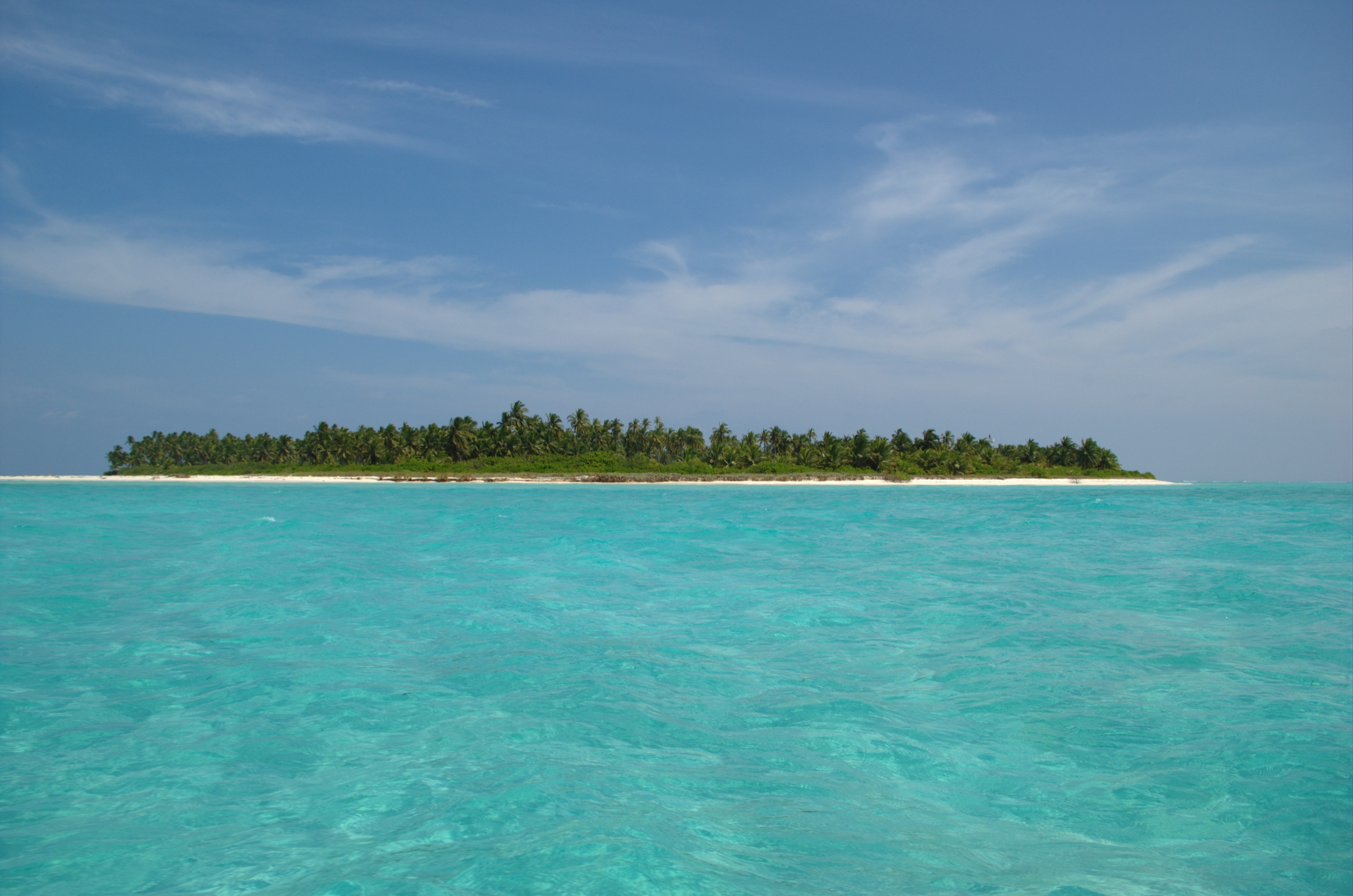
One of the islands of Bangaram Atoll

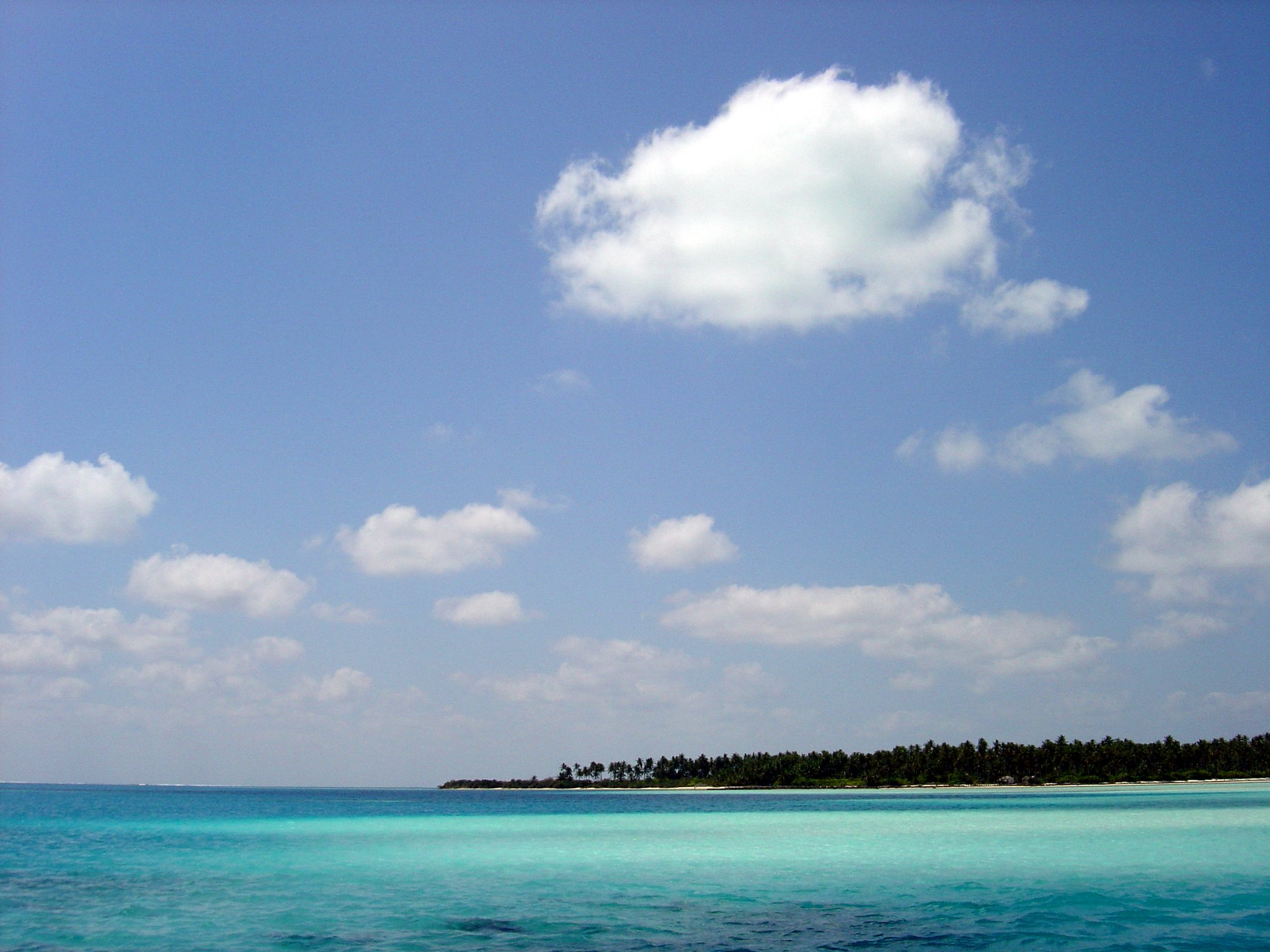
View of the lagoon off Bangaram Island

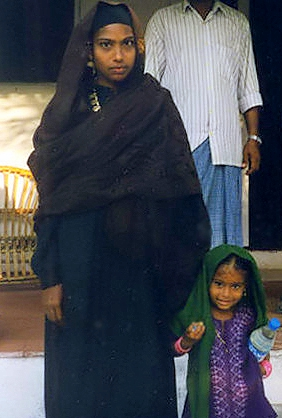
Bangaram resident mother with child
