= Cochin International Airport =

Airport in Kochi, Kerala, India

Cochin International Airport കൊച്ചി അന്താരാഷ്ട്ര വിമാനത്താവളം (Malayalam)

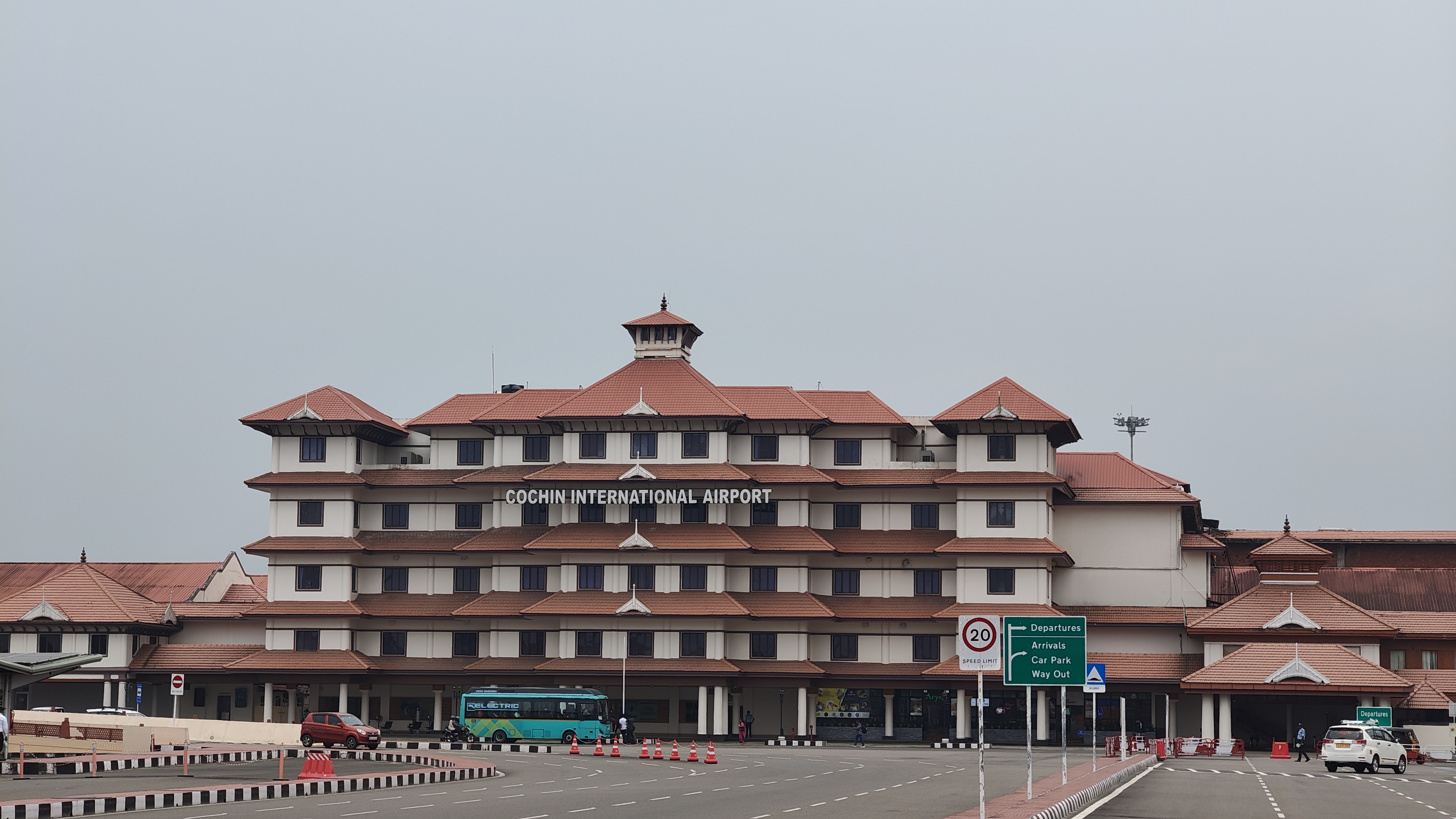
- Airport domestic terminal
- IATA: COK; ICAO: VOCI

Summary
- Airport type: Public-private partnership (PPP)
- Owner/Operator: Cochin International Airport Limited (CIAL) (68.58%); Government of Kerala (32.42%)
- Serves: Kochi
- Location: Nedumbassery, Kochi, Kerala, India
- Opened: 25 May 1999; 27 years ago
- Focus city for: Air India
- Operating base for: Air India Express; IndiGo
- Elevation AMSL: 9 m (30 ft)
- Coordinates: 10°09′12.00″N 76°23′17.39″E
- Website: www.cial.aero

Map
- Location within Kerala Location within India

Runways
Direction	Length		Surface
Direction	m	ft	Surface
09/27	3,445	11,302	Asphalt

Helipads
Number	Length		Surface
Number	m	ft	Surface
H1	19	63	Asphalt

Statistics (April 2025 - March 2026)
- Passengers: 1,13,02,552 (▲1.5%)
- Aircraft movements: 71,722 (▼0.5%)
- Cargo tonnage: 68,074.6 (▲9.8%)
- Source: AAI

Cochin International Airport (IATA: COK, ICAO: VOCI), also known as Kochi International Airport, is an international airport serving the city and metropolitan area of Kochi, Kerala, India. Located at Nedumbassery within the Ernakulam district, about 25 km (16 mi) northeast of the city centre, it is the busiest and largest airport in Kerala, catering to more than 63% of the total air passenger traffic in Kerala as of 2025. It is the fifth-busiest airport in India in terms of international traffic, and the eighth-busiest overall.

In fiscal year 2025–26, the airport handled more than 11 million passengers with a total of 73,134 aircraft movements. As of 2025, the airport is served by over 25 airline companies, carrying passengers to over 30 international destinations and over 25 domestic destinations. The airport operates three passenger terminals, one cargo terminal, and one business terminal, with a total area of over 225,000 square metres (2,421,880 sq ft).

In 2015, the airport became the world's first fully solar powered airport with the inauguration of a dedicated solar plant. For this entrepreneurial vision, the airport won the coveted Champions of the Earth award in 2018, the highest environmental honour instituted by the United Nations. The airport is also the first of its kind to be developed under a public–private partnership (PPP) model in India, having been funded by nearly 10,000 non-resident Indians from 32 countries. The airport was named "Best Airport in Asia-Pacific" in 2020 (5 to 15 million passengers per year) by Airports Council International.

== History ==
Cochin airport began as an airstrip on Willingdon Island, built in 1936 by the Kingdom of Cochin, intended for transporting officials involved in the development of the Cochin Port. The Kingdom of Cochin allowed the British, who ruled India at the time, to convert the airstrip into a military airport for use by the Indian Navy during World War II. The Royal Navy chose it as a strategic site for their headquarters in Southern India and as an air station cum landing craft and seaplane base. The military facility hosted naval fighter planes and was intended to thwart possible Japanese air raids. A small naval unit set up operations just two days before the outbreak of World War II.

After India achieved dominion status and the merger of the Kingdom of Cochin with India, the Indian Navy operated the airport, INS Garuda, though it permitted civilian aircraft to use the facility. The Gulf economic boom of the 1980s made it necessary to develop international connections to Kochi in the interests of expatriates working in the Middle East.

Flights previously operated to London's Gatwick and Heathrow airports from the airport by Air India, but as of October 2025 these flights remain suspended. Airlines such as British Airways have been reported to be prospective carriers in resuming the Kochi-London route, though they have yet to materialise services.

== Construction ==
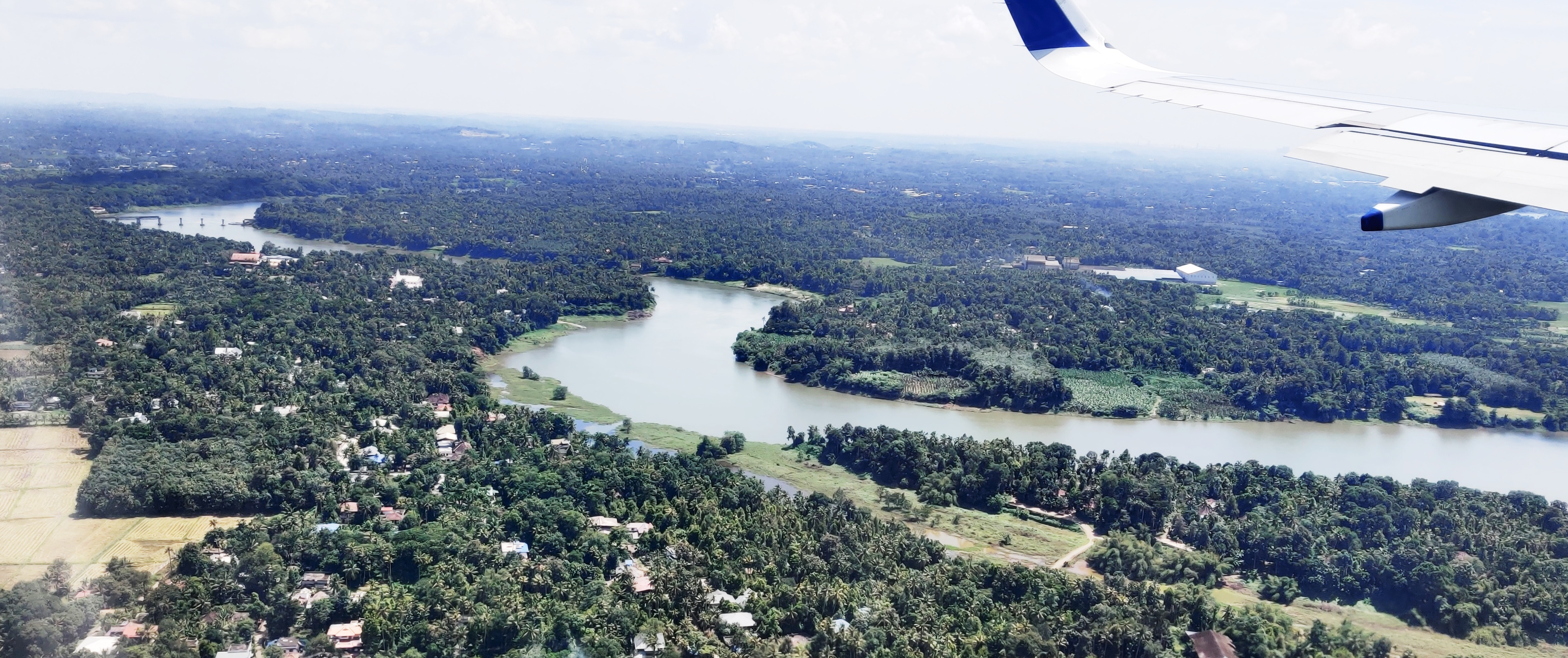
The airport was constructed right by the Periyar river, seen from a landing plane.

The original proposal for the airport outlined an estimated cost of ₹1 billion (US$11 million) and an expected date of commission in 1997. Approval was granted in May 1993. The funding was envisaged to be from interest-free loans from non-resident Indians working abroad, donations from industrial undertakings, exporters, cooperative societies and loans from the state government. A body called the Cochin International Airport Society, under the chairmanship of the Chief Minister of Kerala K. Karunakaran, was registered in July 1993 to execute the project. To better fund mobilisation, as well as an administrative convenience, a public limited company under the name Cochin International Airport Ltd. (CIAL) was registered in March 1994 with an authorised capital of ₹900 million (US$9.6 million).

In 1996, E. K. Nayanar took over as chairman of the CIAL project. The construction picked up momentum during this period and Nayanar ensured that the airport project received special attention from the State Government and gave his unstinting support to CIAL. By 1997, substantial land was taken into CIAL possession through negotiated settlements. A total of 491 ha (1,213 acres) of land was acquired for the construction of the airport. Approximately 2,300 landowners and 872 families were resettled under a rehabilitation package. Major electric lines and an irrigation canal had to be diverted. The facility was formally inaugurated by the then President of India, K. R. Narayanan on 25 May 1999 and the first commercial service began on 10 June 1999. The operations from the old naval airport were moved to CIAL on 1 July 1999.

=== Expansion ===
==== Phase 3 ====
Work on the third phase was intended to accommodate 5 million passenger movements annually and was started in 2007. The third phase involved the commissioning of a central block, connecting the domestic and international terminals and enlarging the airside area to accommodate more gates and waiting areas along with increased shopping areas. This increased the built-up area by another 29,700 m^{2} (320,000 sq ft). The airside area of the international arrivals and departures blocks were integrated and glass walls were installed to allow for more natural light. The runway was re-surfaced in 2008. The number of parking areas was increased from 15 to 24, including three dedicated for cargo airlines. The third phase also completed the expansion of the cargo village and a second aircraft taxiway to the MRO facility.

==== Phase 4 ====
The fourth phase of expansion was originally planned to upgrade the domestic terminal, which has remained untouched in the past three phases.

As per the revised plans, the international terminal is to face a major renovation before being converted completely into a domestic terminal, while a new state-of-the-art international terminal is coming up. As per the new plans announced by the board of directors in September 2011, the new international terminal would come up on the eastern side of the existing structure. The built-up space of the new terminal would be 140,000 m^{2} (1,500,000 sq ft) having segregated departures and arrivals at different levels. The new terminal with an elevation featuring Kerala temple architecture will have all the latest features of international standards. Construction major Larsen & Toubro is building the facility, which is expected to be ready within 30 months. The two-level terminal will have provisions for 112 check-in counters, with in-line baggage screening facilities, 100 immigration counters, 3,716 square metres (40,000 sq ft) of duty-free shops at departure and arrival lounges, 19 boarding gates, 15 aerobridges, six baggage conveyor belts and a fully covered alighting and boarding area.

== Management ==
Cochin International Airport is the first in India to be built by a public-private partnership and is owned by a public limited company called Cochin International Airport Limited, better known as CIAL, created by the Government of Kerala in 1994. The Government of Kerala holds a 33.36% stake, making it the single largest investor in the project. Indian government companies like Air India, BPCL and AAI hold an 8.74% stake, while foreign companies like Abu Dhabi based Lulu Group International, the Oman-based Galfar Group, UAE based Majeed Bukatara Trading holds a 5.42% stake. Indian companies hold 8.57% stake, while scheduled commercial banks like Federal Bank, SBI and Canara Bank hold 5.91%. The remaining 38.03% stake is held by more than 10,000 personal investors from 29 countries, mostly non-resident Indians.

The company has decided to go for a public offering and give 10 million shares to HUDCO as part of a debt settlement, which would to lead HUDCO having a 3.37% stake in the company and a reduction of the stake of other holders.

The chief minister of Kerala is the ex-officio chairman of CIAL.

== Terminals ==
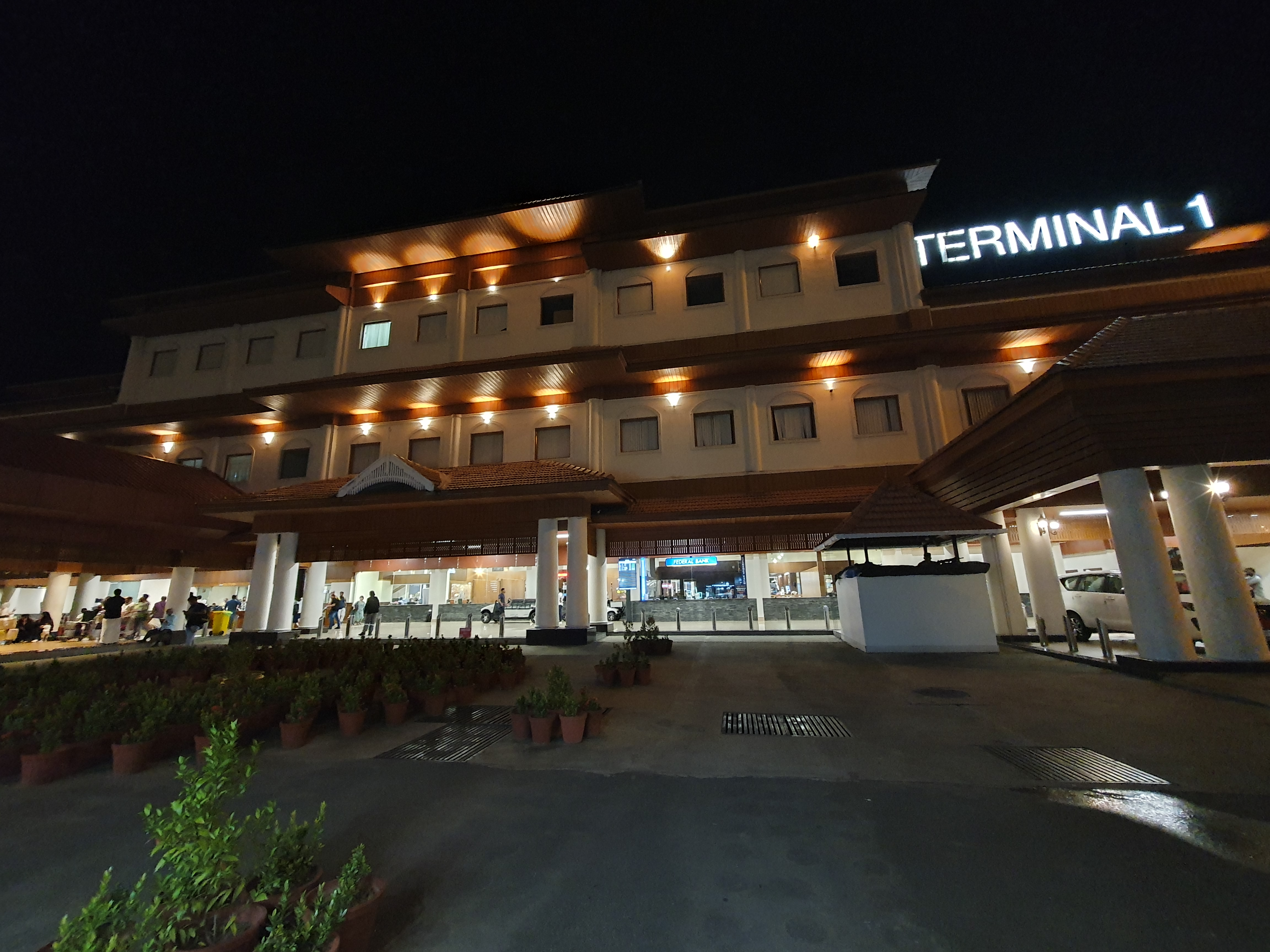
Terminal 1 at CIAL

Cochin International Airport has three main terminals: two domestic and one international. There is also a cargo terminal.

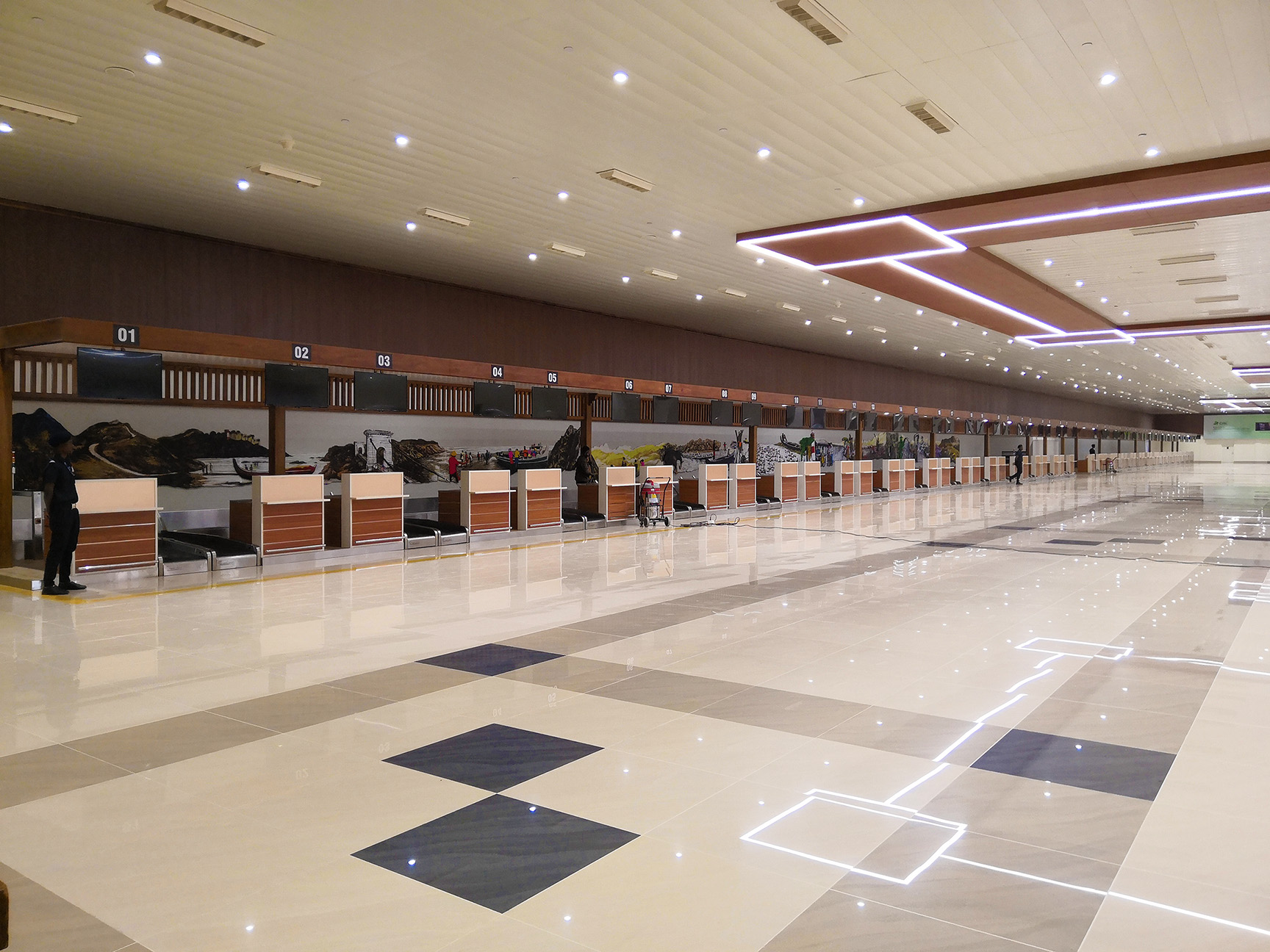
Check-in counters at Terminal 1

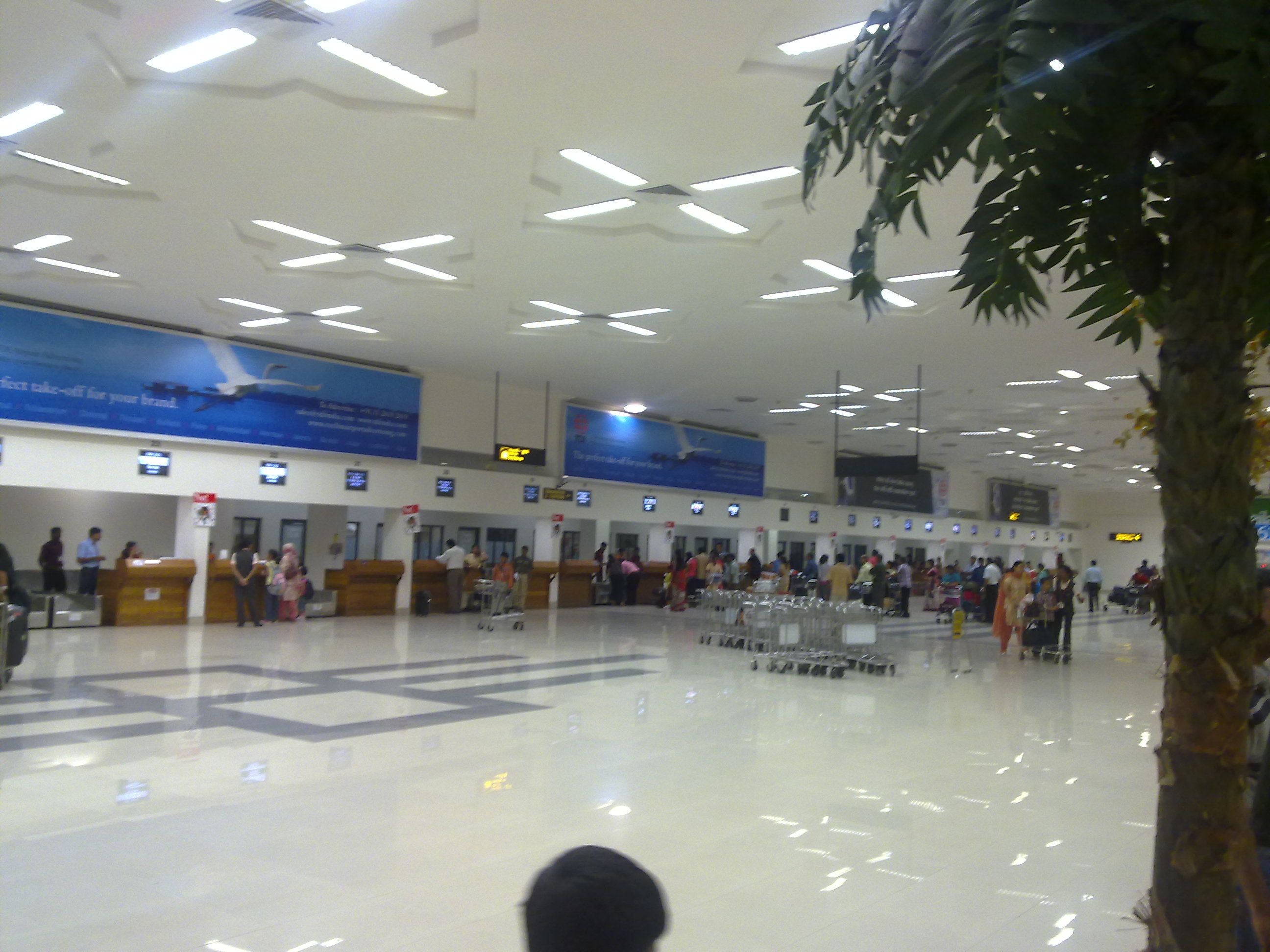
Check-in counters at the former Terminal 2

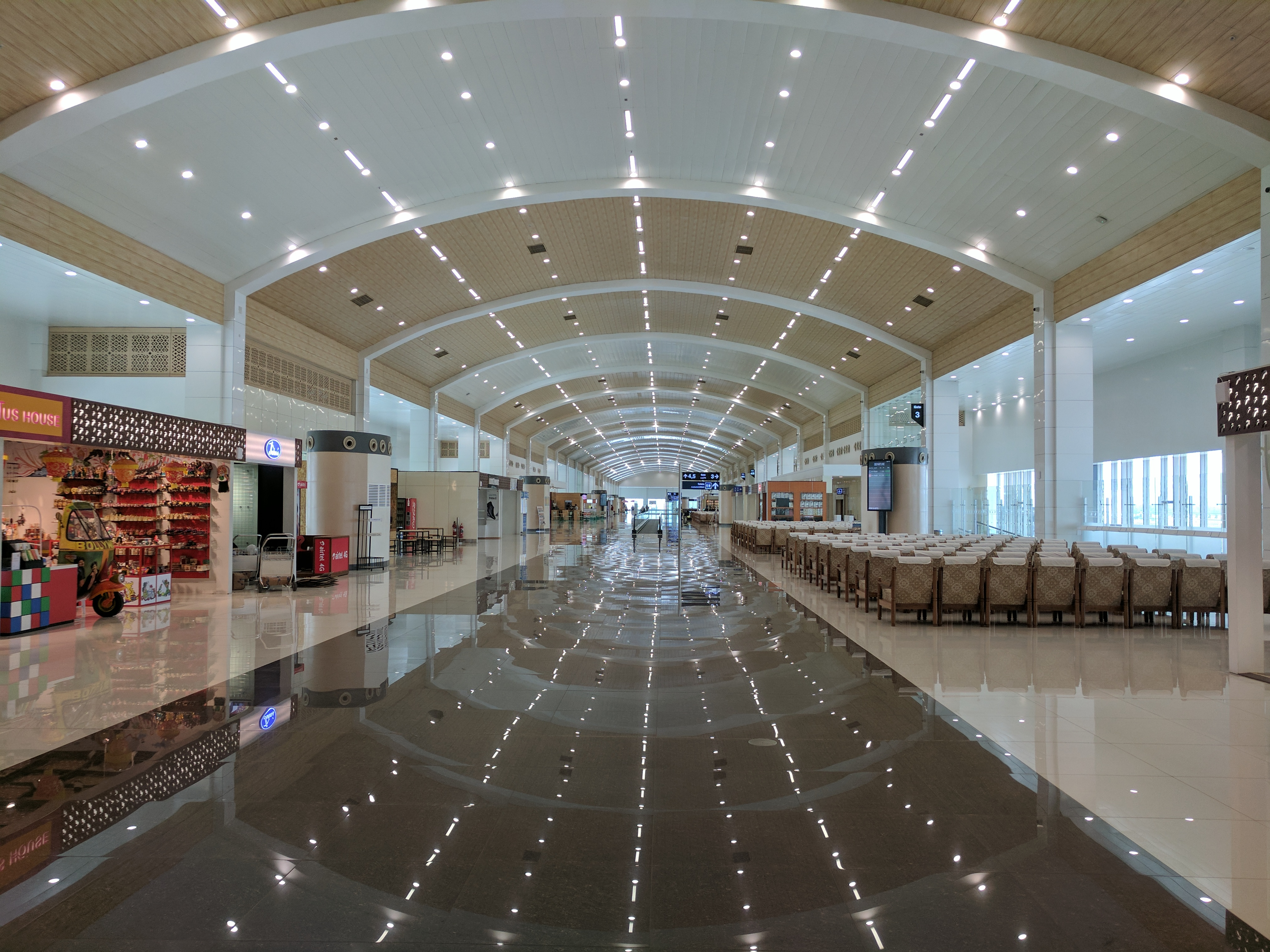
Terminal 3 airside departures area

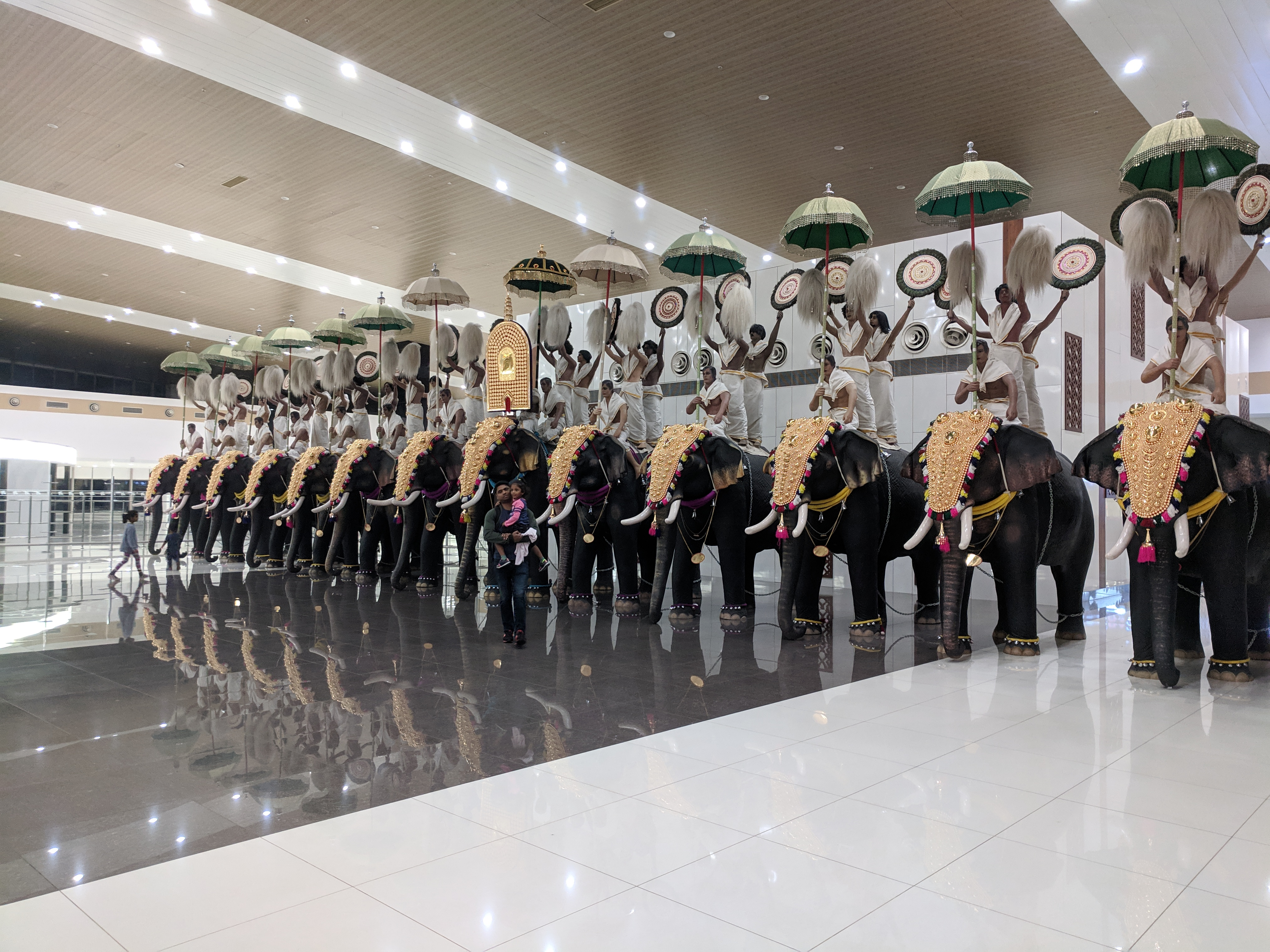
Inside the Terminal 3 landside departures area, with statues depicting the Thrissur Pooram festival

=== Terminal 1 (domestic) ===
Terminal 1 was formerly the international terminal until the operations were shifted to the new international Terminal 3. The terminal underwent a massive upgrade and renovation after that, which took its total handling capacity to 4,000 passengers per hour which is 5 times the previous capacity. The renovated Terminal 1 was opened to travellers on 12 December 2018.

With a total built-up area of 55,742 m^{2} (600,000 sq ft), Terminal 1 has 56 check-in counters, seven aerobridges and a conveyor belt system to transfer baggage from 12 flights at a time. It is also equipped with six reserve lounges, an art area, a food court, an executive lounge, and a 4,645-square-metre (50,000 sq ft) shopping area. The terminal has a solar carport facility that can generate 2.4 MW of power and can house 1,400 cars. Together with the solar carport at the International Terminal 3, it can generate 5.1 MW of power which is the largest carport in the world.

=== Terminal 2 (executive) ===
Terminal 2 has an area of 10,000 m^{2} (110,000 sq ft) and is designed to handle up to 400 passengers at peak times. The departure hall has 26 common use terminal equipment (CUTE) enabled check-in counters, including six premium check-in counters, and four self-check-in counters. It has six security gates and a common waiting area that can accommodate 400 passengers at a time. There is also a family lounge and a premium lounge for business class passengers and a food court is housed in the waiting area, while a restaurant operates in entry lobby. There are four remote gates facility available for domestic passengers. The arrivals hall has two baggage carousels.

=== Terminal 3 (international) ===
The new international Terminal 3 was opened to travellers in March 2017. The theme of the terminal is inspired by Thrissur Pooram and is built in the traditional Kerala architecture style. 15 life-size fibre elephants wearing traditional costumes welcome the travellers at the departure facility area. The terminal has five entry gates, 84 check-in counters and 80 immigration counters. It is equipped with 10 escalators, 21 elevators, and three moving walkways. The terminal has a solar carport facility with a capacity of generating 2.7 MW power, and can provide a parking facility for 1,400 cars. Along with the solar carport at the domestic Terminal 1, it is the largest solar carport in the world, with a total capacity of 5.1 MW of power and a parking facility for 2,800 cars.

With a total area of more than 150,000 m^{2} (1,614,587 sq ft), the terminal is built over four levels. The ground level handles arrivals. With a total ground area of around 41,156 m^{2} (442,999 sq ft), it has 10 customs counters, three bank counters, a shopping complex for the passengers and the general public, a VIP lounge, arrival duty-free shops and a baggage claim area. The second level (5.5 metres above ground level) also handles arrivals and is equipped with 30 immigration counters, 10 e-T-Visa counters, five health check counters, and two moving walkways. The third level (10.5 metres above ground level) is the departure facility area. It has a 20,836 m^{2} (224,277 sq ft) check-in area, three check-in islands having a total of 84 counters, 40 emigration counters, an 800-square-metre (8,611 sq ft) departure duty-free shop, three VIP reserved lounges, airline offices, two prayer rooms, and a moving walkway. The fourth level (15.5 metres above ground level) is the departure security hold area. With an area of more than 8,674 m^{2} (93,366 sq ft), it has a food court, restaurant, three airline executive lounges, smoking lounge, bar and reclining area.

With the commissioning of Terminal 3, Cochin International Airport became India's 4th largest airport after Delhi, Mumbai, and Kolkata, with a total built up area of more than 213,677 m^{2} (2,300,000 sq ft) for commercial operations.

=== Cargo centre ===
Cochin Airport has a dedicated cargo centre on the eastern side of the complex. The cargo centre is one of the largest facilities in India with a total floor space of 11,000 m^{2} (120,000 sq ft) in 20 hectares (50 acres) of land.An extended cargo warehouse was also inaugurated on the airport premises on 1 January 2026, raising the annual goods movement from 75,000 tonnes to 125,000 tonnes per year. There are three complexes in the cargo village:

- The Centre for Dry Cargo (CDC), with an area of 4,600 m^{2} (50,000 sq ft), has a dedicated warehousing facility and air-customs inspection facility for both import and export.
- The Centre for Perishable Cargo (CPC) is the largest dedicated cold storage centre for perishable goods in India. It has a floor area of about 2,000 m^{2} (22,000 sq ft) and can handle approximately 25,000 tonnes of cargo. It was commissioned in 2008 at a cost of ₹380 million (US$4.1 million) jointly by CIAL, the Government of India through the Agricultural and Food Promotion Export Development Authority (APEDA), and the Government of Kerala.
- The Transshipment Cargo Complex is a dedicated warehouse allocated for transshipment cargo. The import and export cargo from the customs warehouses in the catchment area, as well as from airports like Chennai, Bangalore, and Coimbatore, are handled and stored at this centre for export.
- Additional facilities to support the three main cargo complexes include two X-ray machines and explosive trace detection machines, a dedicated dangerous goods room, two refrigeration rooms maintained between +2 °C to +8 °C, a radioactivecCargo room, and a high-value goods room.

An exclusive domestic cargo complex has also been constructed for private domestic logistics firms and India Post services.

=== Business jet terminal ===
According to CIAL, it is now only the fourth airport in India with a terminal for business jets. The terminal is expected to provide customised services to charter and private jets.

==== 0484 Aero Lounge ====
Cochin International Airport Limited (CIAL) unveiled India's largest aero lounge on 1 September 2024. The facility, spanning 50,000 square feet, offers a range of amenities including guest rooms, boardrooms, conference halls, co-working spaces, and a lounge accessible to both passengers and visitors. the Kerala Aviation Summit was hosted there on 25 and 26 August 2025.

== Infrastructure ==
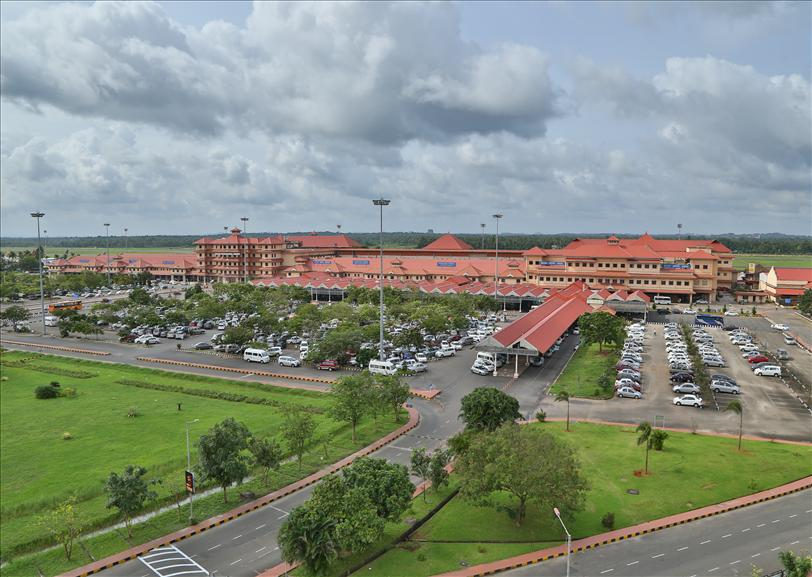
Terminal 1 and parking area

=== Air traffic control ===
The air traffic control (ATC) tower is 60 m (200 ft) tall. Cochin ATC controls flights below an altitude of 7,800 m (25,500 ft). The airport has two instrument landing systems (ILS) using distance measuring equipment (DME) which enable flights to land from both sides of the runway even in rough weather conditions. CIAL is the only airport in the country besides the airport in metros to have such a facility. The ATC uses Doppler VHF omni range I and II.

Large-scale upgrades such as the latest AIRCON 2100 air traffic control automation system were also introduced.

=== Airport surveillance radar ===
The Airports Authority of India has installed an advanced airport surveillance radar (ASR) as well as monopulse secondary surveillance radar (MSSR). In addition, a surface movement radar was installed for effective monitoring of flights on the runway and in parking bays.

=== Runway ===
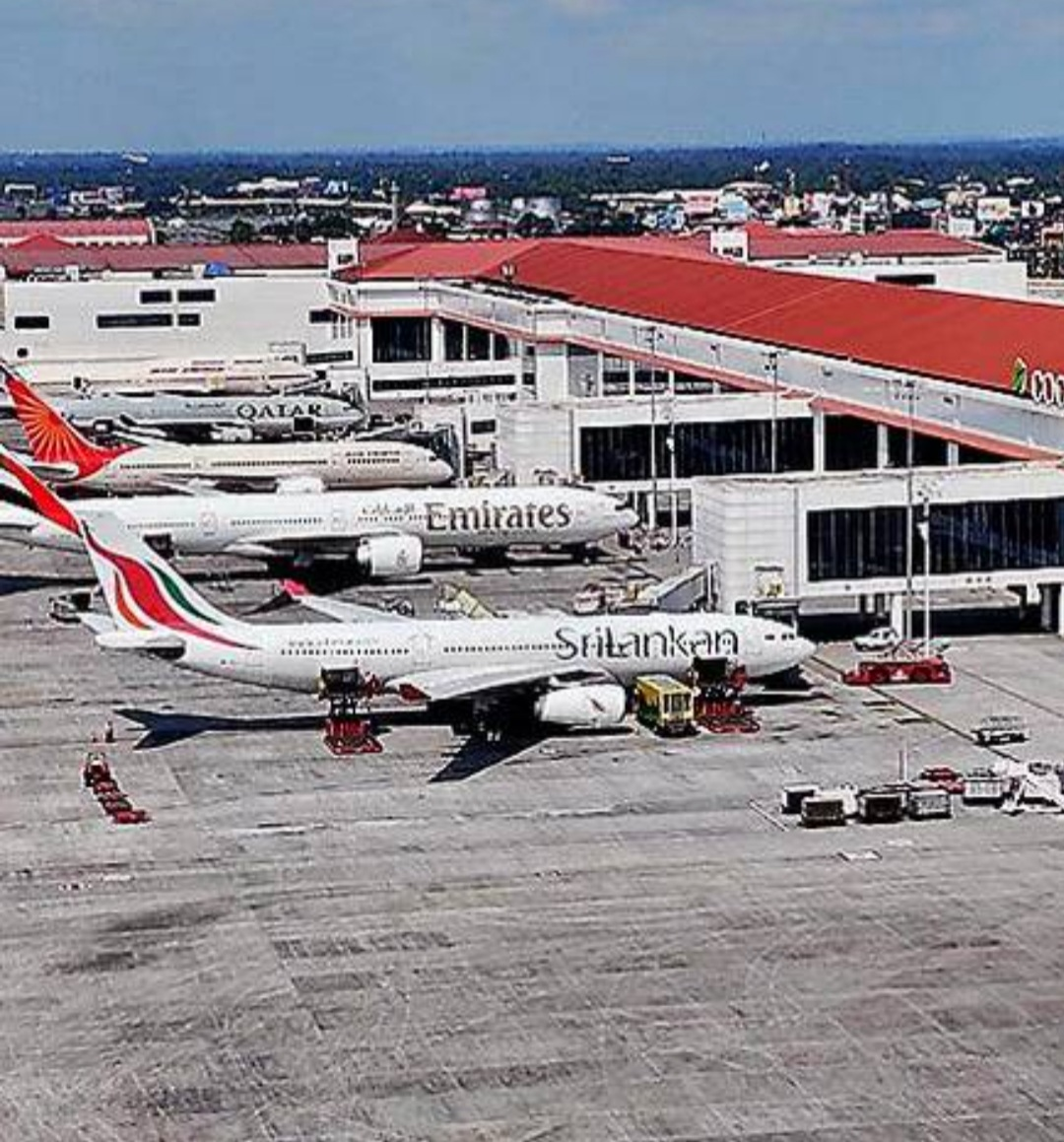
Apron area of Terminal 3 of the airport, with planes from SriLankan Airlines, Emirates, Qatar Airways and Air India

Cochin International Airport has one 3,445-metre-long runway oriented as 27/09, which can handle Code E planes. It has a full-length parallel taxiway of 3,445 m (11,302 ft). The 807 m × 125 m (2,648 ft × 410 ft) apron comprising 16 stands can accommodate five wide-bodied and eight-narrow bodied aircraft. The runway is spread over the panchayat areas of Nedumbassery, Sreemoolanagaram and Kanjoor.

Cochin Airport has one helipad for dedicated use of helicopters, meant for air-taxi purposes. Plans for constructing a heliport are underway.

=== MRO hangar ===
Cochin International Aviation Services Ltd. (CIASL), a wholly owned subsidiary of CIAL, operates two narrow body hangars at Kochi Airport. A new large MRO facility is planned to be built by June 2026 along with large covered parking areas for planes.

=== Naval Air Enclave ===
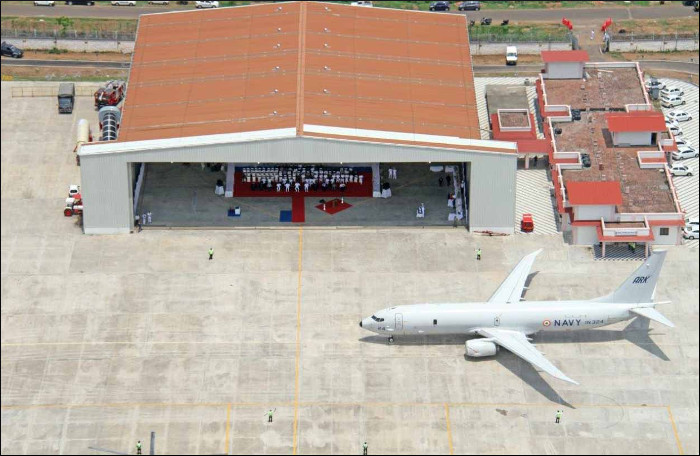
Naval Air Enclave at the airport

Construction began in 2013 on 4 hectares (10 acres) of Navy-owned land at the airport.

=== Indian Coast Guard Air Enclave ===
The facility comprises two hangars to accommodate the Chetak helicopter squadron, and the Dornier squadron along with advanced light helicopters are expected to be based here. The Air Enclave would have a 50m taxi link to the runway at CIAL and would consist of aircraft hangars, technical areas and administrative buildings.

== Airlines and destinations ==
=== Passenger ===
Airlines	Destinations
Air Arabia	Abu Dhabi, Sharjah
Air India	Delhi, Mumbai
Air India Express	Abu Dhabi, Bahrain, Bangkok–Suvarnabhumi, Bengaluru, Bhubaneswar, Doha, Dubai–International, Hyderabad, Kuwait City, Muscat, Pune, Ras Al Khaimah, Salalah, Sharjah, Thiruvananthapuram
AirAsia	Kuala Lumpur–International
Akasa Air	Bengaluru, Dammam, Dubai–International, Jeddah, Kuwait City, Mumbai–Navi
Alliance Air	Salem
Batik Air Malaysia	Kuala Lumpur–International
Emirates	Dubai–International
Etihad Airways	Abu Dhabi
Flydubai	Dubai–International
Flynas	Riyadh
Fly91	Agatti
Gulf Air	Bahrain
IndiGo	Abu Dhabi, Agatti, Ahmedabad, Bahrain, Bengaluru, Chennai, Doha, Dubai–International, Fujairah, Goa–Dabolim, Hyderabad, Kannur, Kolkata, Kozhikode, Kuwait City, Malé, Mumbai–Navi, Mumbai-Shivaji, Muscat, Pune, Thiruvananthapuram
Jazeera Airways	Kuwait City
Kuwait Airways	Kuwait City
Malaysia Airlines	Kuala Lumpur–International
Maldivian	Malé; Seasonal: Hanimaadhoo
Oman Air	Muscat
Qatar Airways	Doha
Saudia	Jeddah, Riyadh
Singapore Airlines	Singapore
SpiceJet	Chennai, Dubai–International, Fujairah
SriLankan Airlines	Colombo–Bandaranaike
Thai AirAsia	Bangkok–Don Mueang, Phuket
Thai Lion Air	Bangkok–Don Mueang
VietJet Air	Ho Chi Minh City

=== Cargo ===
Airlines	Destinations
Afcom	Dubai–Al Maktoum
Emirates SkyCargo	Dubai–International
Etihad Cargo	Abu Dhabi
IndiGo Cargo	Sharjah
Oman Air Cargo	Muscat
Qatar Airways Cargo	Doha
Saudia Cargo	Riyadh
Singapore Airlines Cargo	Singapore
SpiceXpress	Sharjah

== Statistics ==
=== Busiest routes ===
Top 10 busiest routes by peak daily flight frequencies – Cochin International Airport (May 2026)
Rank	Airport	Frequencies (arrivals/departures)	Airlines
1	Bengaluru	13	Air India Express, Akasa Air, Alliance Air, IndiGo
2	Mumbai-Shivaji	13	Air India, Akasa Air, IndiGo
3	Delhi	10	Air India, IndiGo
4	Abu Dhabi	9	Air Arabia, Air India Express, Akasa Air, Etihad Airways, IndiGo
5	Hyderabad	7	Air India Express, IndiGo
6	Chennai	5	IndiGo, SpiceJet
7	Dubai	4	Air India Express, Emirates, Flydubai, IndiGo, SpiceJet
8	Agatti	3	Alliance Air, Fly91, IndiGo
9	Muscat	3	Air India Express, Akasa Air, Oman Air
10	Kuala Lumpur	4	AirAsia, Batik Air Malaysia, Malaysia Airlines

== Security ==
Security management training is provided by CIAL's Aviation Academy and personnel are employed by the company as security agents – deployed in baggage screening rooms, entry gates, the general cargo area and the lounge areas. CIAL ASW employs Army-trained sniffer dogs to check for explosives in baggage areas, the only Indian airport to have such a facility. CIAL has introduced three state-of-the-art ION scanning detectors that can identify small amounts of material, down to nanograms, of explosives.

The airport is under the direct protection of the Kochi City Police, who have a station outside the terminal. CISF maintains two armed squadrons and one bomb detection and disposal squad. CISF has a command centre 250 metres outside the terminal, with an intelligence division and mobilisation cell. The air customs division operates a narcotics detection squad in the terminal. The CIAL ASWs are working on installing a fully automated perimeter intrusion detection system that will detect any possible violation, using sensors that will provide critical time for the security forces to react. Phase one of the intrusion prevention system is in place with barricades, automatic retractable bollards, surveillance cameras, parking gate management systems and the introduction of biometric ID cards for staff.

The immigration department is handled by Kerala Police, Special Branch officials trained by the Bureau of Immigration.

The airport company also has a high-end robotic security system capable of remote-handling of explosive devices and fire-fighting and hostage situations. The system is operational from September 2014, making CIAL the first in South India to have such a facility. It comprises safety robots developed by Canada-based Pedsco Ltd. and Threat Containment Vessel (TCV) and sophisticated luggage containment vehicle – both developed by Nabco, USA. The main equipment of the system is a threat containment vessel (TCV) carried by robots, which is capable of containing a blast of minimum 8 kg of TNT or equivalent quantity of explosive, triggered by suspected luggage including chemicals, radioactive materials and bombs. The container is reusable as it withstands repeated detonations and size of the TCV can be adjusted with the size of the suspected baggage. In addition to TCV, the technology also comprises a remote mobile Investigator (RMI)-9WT, which is a multi-purpose six-wheel vehicle with removable tracks for step climbing capability. Using fixed arm extenders, the robot can be configured for different applications such as under car searches and second-store window access.

== Education and training ==
Since 2008, CIAL has been the first airport to venture into providing higher education in aviation management and technical areas to overcome the shortage of skilled manpower in the aviation industry.

CIAL Aviation Academy provides two-year management degrees in aviation and airport management, operations, economics, finance and human resources, along with short-term aviation oriented vocational diplomas. The academy also trains technical manpower required for airport operations. Air India Express has its temporary stewards grooming and training centre in the facility.

Aviation Security Training Institute – The Aviation Security Training Institute (ASTI), envisioned by the Bureau of Civil Aviation Security has been inaugurated in February 2014. The institute has state-of-the-art facilities like X-ray simulators (21), explosive model room, two classrooms with LCD projectors and other training infrastructures. Explosive model rooms display different types of switch mechanism to trigger explosion. Library consists of CDs, catering to International Civil Aviation With the establishment of ASTI in Kochi, employees and management personnel from Mangalore, Kozhikode, Coimbatore, Trichy, Madurai and Thiruvananthapuram airports can take training here. Employees of the proposed Kannur international airport are also likely to be trained here.

== Ground transportation ==
CIAL is located between National Highway 544 (NH 544), one of the main highways of South India, and the Main Central Road (MC Road), one of the main state highways of Kerala. An expressway is planned from erstwhile NH 49 (now part NH85) to the MC Road to facilitate faster transport.

=== Railway station ===
A Railway station is being constructed near the airport. This station shall serve high capacity express trains from both North and Central Kerala.

=== Metro services ===
Kochi Metro Rail Limited (KMRL) is planning to extend the Kochi Metro network to the airport. KMRL currently services feeder buses connecting the airport to the metro network at Aluva Metro station. As of October 2026, a Kochi Airport Metro station has been proposed to be built on the land in front of the Taj Hotel, between the international and domestic terminals. The Station shall be connected to the Airport via Escalators. Around 20 cents of CIAL land have been earmarked for the Station. It has been proposed as an elevated station rather than an underground station.

=== Air-taxi services ===
Cochin airport has dedicated air-taxi services for passengers to travel to major pilgrim destinations in Kerala as well as to cities like Thiruvananthapuram and in northern Kerala like Kozhikode. In association with Bharat Airways, it provides scheduled air-taxi services to Sabarimala.

== CIAL Aerotropolis ==
One of the main projects for the future of the airport was the CIAL Aerotropolis, or Airport City, with a total area of 202 hectares (500 acres).

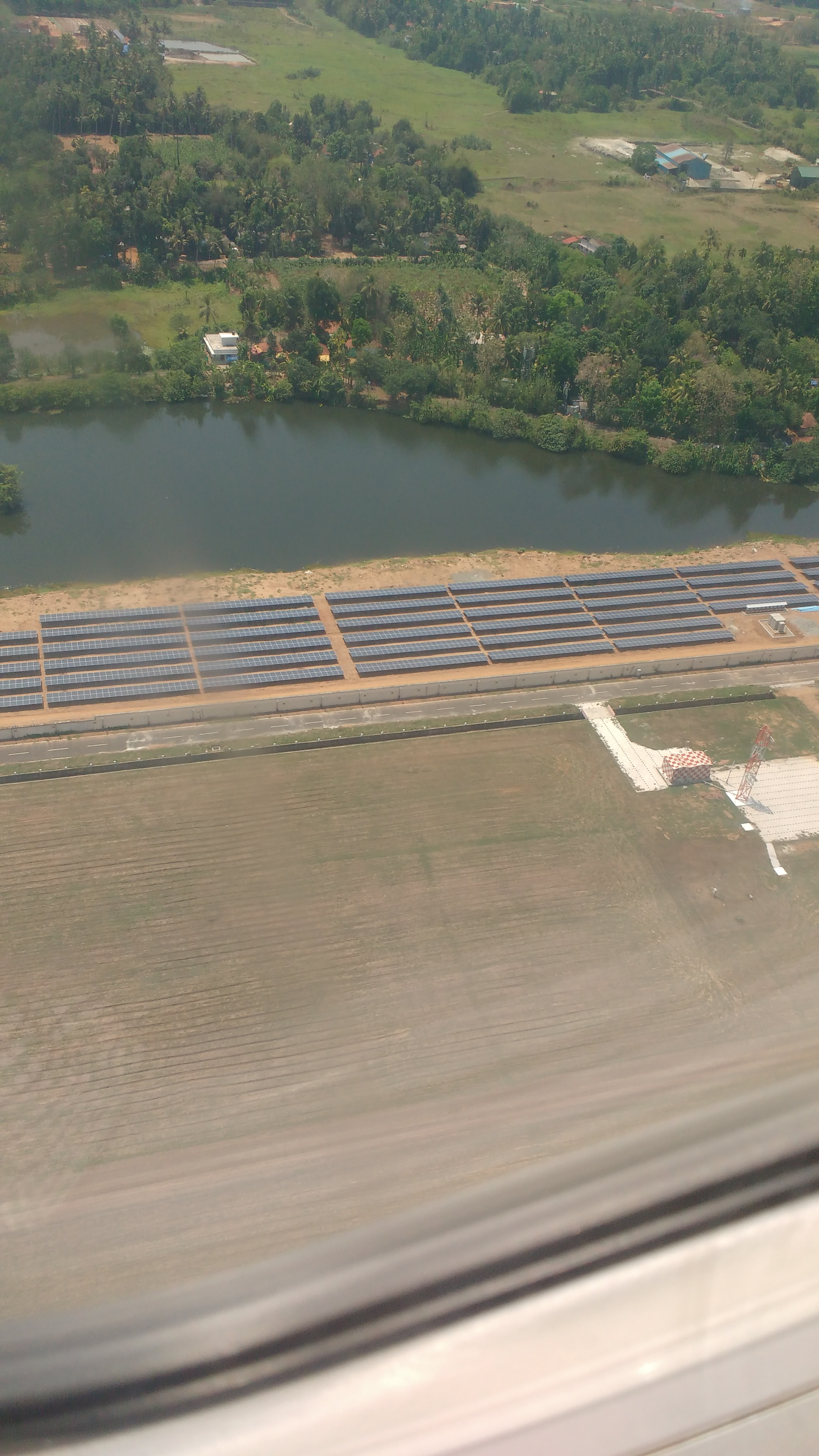
Part of the airport's solar power plant

=== Manufacturing and business zone ===
The master plan envisages the creation of a special economic zone (SEZ) for aircraft-allied industries, especially spare parts and OEM manufacturing units, an airline research and development centre, workshops and service zones. An information technology park, with dedicated airline support technology, design and development centres, is also proposed. An integrated logistics centre and central container freight station are planned at the cargo village.

=== CIAL solar power project ===
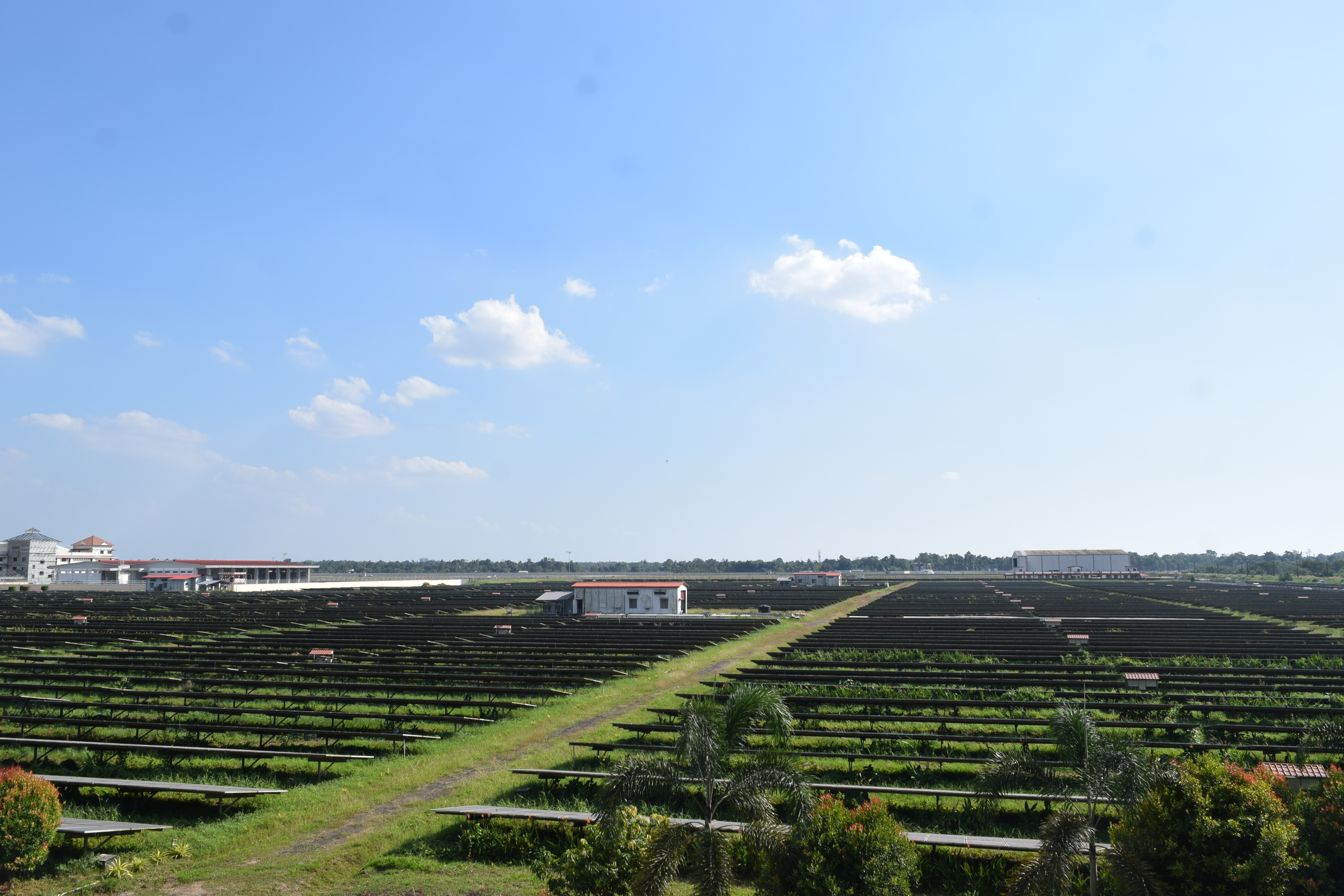
Solar power plant

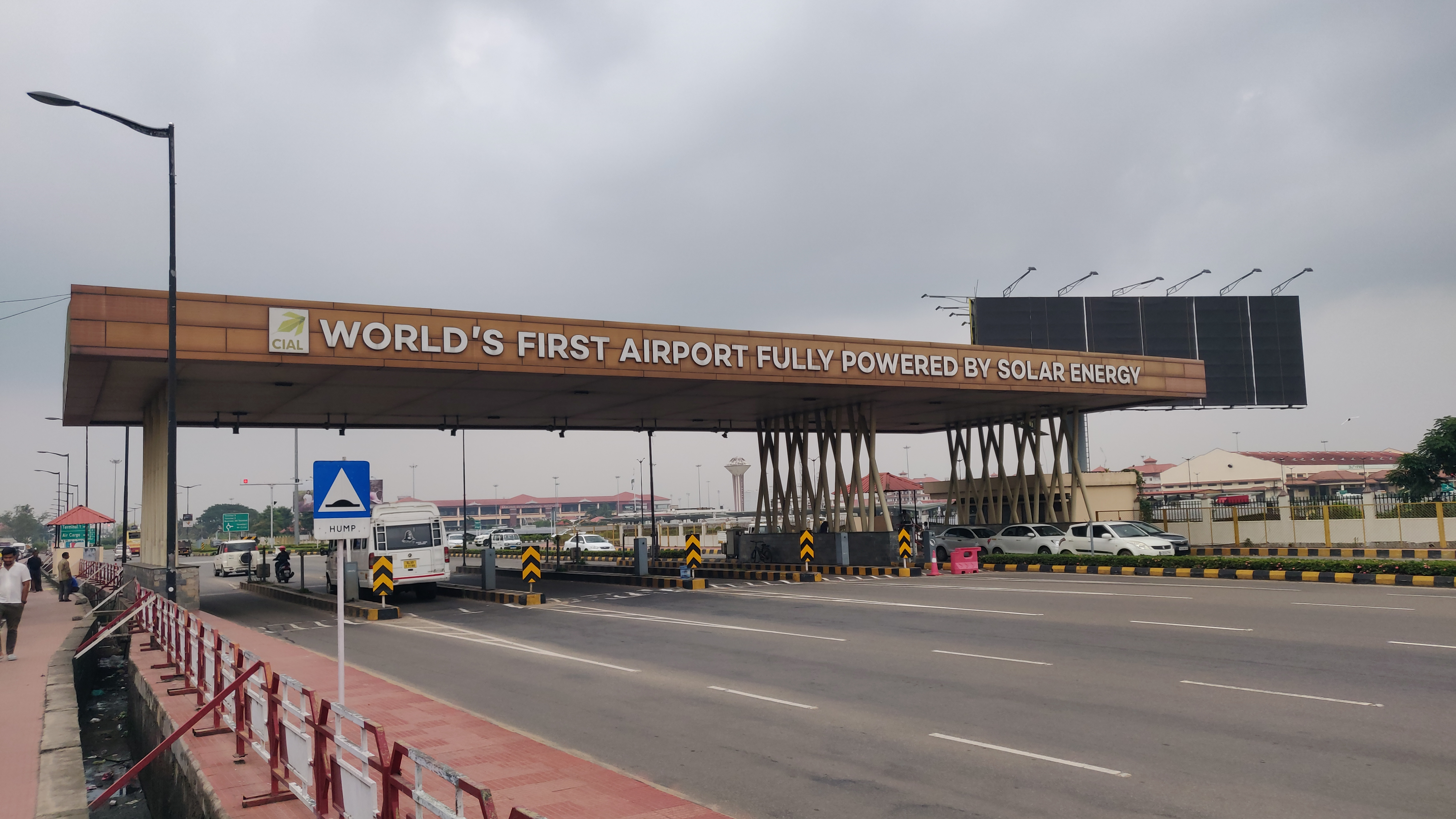
Board at entrance

The CIAL Solar Power Project is a 15 megawatt (MW) photovoltaic (PV) power station built by CIAL. Cochin International Airport became the first fully solar-powered airport in the world with the commissioning of the plant.

The plant comprises 46,150 solar panels laid across 18 ha (45 acres) near the international cargo complex, and was installed by the German-based Bosch. It is capable of generating 50,000 units of electricity daily, and is equipped with a supervisory control and data acquisition system (SCADA), through which remote monitoring is carried out. The project components include PV modules of 265 watt-peak (W_{p}) capacity manufactured by Renesola, and inverters of 1 MW capacity manufactured by ABB India.

The plant is coupled with a 1.1 MW solar plant that was commissioned in 2013, the first megawatt scale installation of a solar PV system in Kerala. This plant was installed by Emvee Photovoltaic Power Pvt. Ltd., consisting of 4,000 monocrystalline modules of 250 W_{p} and 33 string inverters of 30 kW capacity each.

CIAL has doubled solar production to 28.8 MW of power production within 2 years as part an ambitious plan to expand solar power, with three major projects under construction. The first came up over a 3.4 km-long (2.1 mi) canal close to the airport, the second was through development of India's first solar carport roof utility plan and the third will use ground level panels on open space near the airport.

== Accidents and incidents ==
- On 30 July 1998, Indian Airlines Flight 503, a Dornier Do 228 from Agatti, crashed into a building after takeoff, killing all six people on board and three more people in the building.
- On 29 August 2011, Gulf Air Flight GF 270, an Airbus A320 from Bahrain, carrying 137 passengers skidded off the runway at 3:55 am during its descent. The reason for the crash is suspected to be the heavy rain at the time. The aircraft had been said to have slipped off the runway and landed nose first. The aircraft broke one of its wings while landing and stalled air traffic for hours. Passengers after the crash, in chaos, were reported to have jumped from the aircraft through emergency exit doors even before stairways were brought into place. The crash caused seven minor injuries and two serious injuries due to the chaos that followed.

=== 2018 Kerala floods ===
As a consequence of the 2018 Kerala floods, the airport was closed between 14–29 August 2018. Water in the Periyar, which flows 500 metres (1,640 ft) away from the airport, rose to 1,433 mm (4.7 ft) during these days. The runway and other facilities were non-functional due to excessive flooding and inclement weather. Flights to Kochi were diverted to and were operating from other airports in the state like Thiruvananthapuram and Kozhikode. From 20 August 2018, INS Garuda (a naval airbase in Kochi) was used as a civilian airport for small aircraft operations to neighbouring cities like Bangalore, Chennai, and Coimbatore. The airport reopened on 29 August 2018, 14:00 Indian Standard Time (UTC+05:30). It suffered an estimated loss of ₹3 billion (US$32 million) during the closed period.

=== 2019 Kerala floods ===
As a consequence of the 2019 Kerala floods, water flooding the runway led to a temporary suspension of airport operations, from 8 August 2019 to 12:00 Indian Standard Time on 11 August 2019.

== Awards and accolades ==
Cochin International Airport achieved major international recognition in 2015 when it became the first fully solar-powered airport in the world. In 2017, it also became the first airport in the world to implement a solar carport, a parking bay with rooftop solar panels. The airport was selected as "the best non-metro airport in India" in 2016 by the Air Passengers Association of India. The airport has also won numerous awards for energy conservation, productivity and infrastructure. In July 2018, the airport was selected for the Champion of the Earth award, the highest environmental honour instituted by the United Nations.
