= Pitti =

Uninhabited coral islet in India

Nickname: Pakshipitti
- Location within India

Geography
- Location: Arabian Sea
- Coordinates: 10°46′31″N 72°32′03″E
- Type: Islet
- Archipelago: Lakshadweep
- Adjacent to: Indian Ocean
- Total islands: 1
- Area: 0.036 km^{2} (0.014 sq mi)
- Coastline: 0.7 km (0.43 mi)
- Highest elevation: 2 m (7 ft)

Administration
- India
- Territory: Union territory of Lakshadweep
- District: Lakshadweep
- Island group: Laccadive Islands
- Tehsils of India: Kavaratti
- Subdivisions of India: Kavaratti

Demographics
- Population: 0 (2014)
- Pop. density: 0/km^{2} (0/sq mi)
- Ethnic groups: Malayali, Mahls

Additional information
- Time zone: IST (UTC+5:30)
- ISO code: IN-LD-05
- Official website: www.lakshadweep.gov.in
- Avg. summer temperature: 32.0 °C (89.6 °F)
- Avg. winter temperature: 28.0 °C (82.4 °F)

Pitti, also known as Pakshipitti (pakshi meaning "bird" in Malayalam, Kannada, Telugu and Tamil), is an uninhabited coral islet in the Union Territory of Lakshadweep, India.

== Geography ==
It is located at 10°46′N 72°32′E about 24 km to the north of Kavaratti, 37 km to the east of Agatti and 42.5 km to the south-southwest of Amini Island. The island is low and arid and, lacking adequate anchorage points, of difficult accessibility. There is another island with the same name in Lakshadweep which is part of the Kalpeni Atoll.

Pitti Island is 300 × 200 m and devoid of vegetation. There is a dark rock on the eastern side and several stone cairns.

== Ecology ==
Pitti is an important nesting place for pelagic birds such as the sooty tern (Sterna fuliginosa), the greater crested tern (Sterna bergii) and the brown noddy (Anous stolidus). The birds nest side by side, but not intermixed, on the dry coral rubble. There is a seasonal pattern in the breeding period of the birds. Since it has no protecting reef surrounding it, the islet is periodically rinsed by wave action and there is no accumulation of guano on it.

== Pitti Bank ==
Pitti is located at the southern end of Pitti Bank, a largely submerged atoll, on the same bank as Amini Island. Pitti Bank, also oriented along a northeast–southwest axis, is 49 km long, in the northern part from 2 to 7 km wide and in the southern part up to 18 km wide. The 11th parallel north passes across the bank. Pitti Bank may be considered a largely submerged and sunken atoll, with an estimated lagoon area of 415 km^{2} (160 sq mi), with just the two islands Amini and Pitti remaining at its opposite ends, 42.5 km apart.

== Administration ==
The island belongs to the township of Kavaratti Island of Kavaratti tehsil.
