= Indian Airlines Flight 503 =

1998 air crash

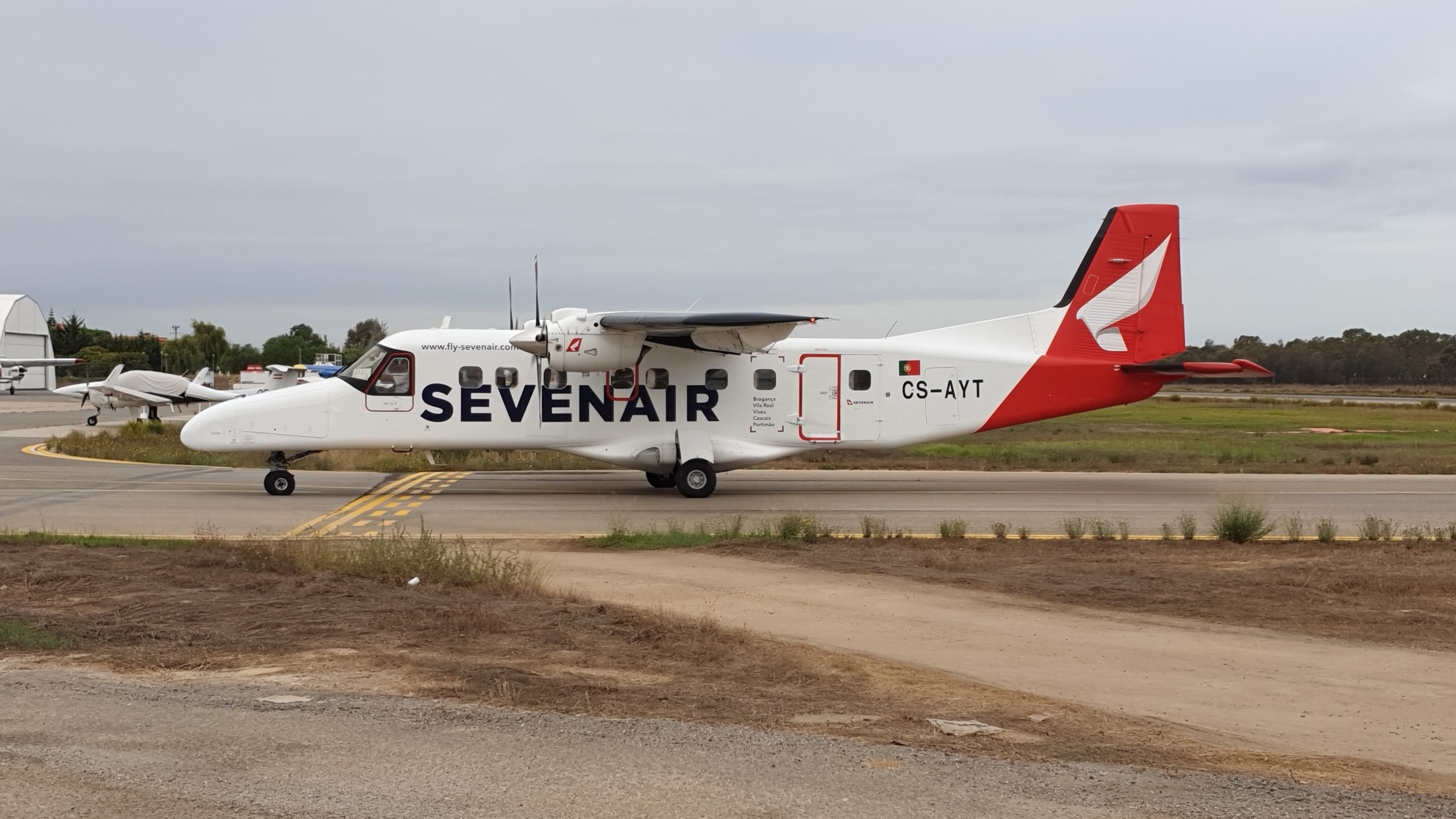
- A Dornier 228 similar to the one involved in the accident

Occurrence
- Date: 30 July 1998
- Summary: Uncommanded pitch-up and stall due to horizontal stabiliser failure caused by improper maintenance
- Site: Near Kochi, Kerala, India
- Total fatalities: 9
- Total injuries: 6 (on ground)

Aircraft
- Aircraft type: HAL Dornier 228
- Operator: Indian Airlines
- IATA flight No.: IC503
- ICAO flight No.: IAC503
- Call sign: INDAIR 503
- Registration: VT-EJW
- Flight origin: Agatti Airport, Agatti, Lakshadweep
- Stopover: Willingdon Island Airport, Kochi, Kerala
- Destination: Thiruvananthapuram International Airport, Thiruvananthapuram, Kerala
- Passengers: 3
- Crew: 3
- Fatalities: 6
- Survivors: 0

Ground casualties
- Ground fatalities: 3
- Ground injuries: 6

Indian Airlines Flight 503 was a scheduled flight operated by Indian Airlines between Agatti and Thiruvananthapuram, with a stopover in Kochi. On 30 July 1998, the Dornier 228 aircraft crashed shortly after takeoff from Kochi killing all six people on board and three people on the ground.

== Aircraft ==
The aircraft involved was a 13-year-old Dornier 228, manufactured in 1986 by Hindustan Aeronautics Limited on licence from Dornier, registered as VT-EJW. The aircraft had previously operated for Vayudoot, however was transferred to Indian Airlines in 1993 to operate the Agatti-Kochi-Thiruvananthapuram route. It had an airworthiness certificate valid until 1999.

== Flight information ==
The flight originated in Agatti, Lakshadweep and was headed for Thiruvananthapuram, Kerala after a stopover at Kochi as Indian Airlines flight 503. Kochi had a naval airport where the Airports Authority of India operated a civil enclave.

The flight was commanded by Captain Shiv Raj Singh with Captain Manish Sharma as co-pilot. The captain had 5,000 hours of flight time on the Dornier while the co-pilot had over 2,000 hours. The only other crew member on board the aircraft was the flight purser, Sajid. There were only three passengers on board the sixteen-seater aircraft, none of whom survived. Three people on the ground were also killed, while six others suffered injuries. The passengers, crew and victims on the ground were all admitted to INHS Sanjivani for treatment.

The aircraft took off from runway 17 of the airport at 11:04am local time. After reaching about 400 feet (122 metres) in its initial climb, it pitched up steeply and entered a stall before banking right, entering an uncontrolled descent and crashing into a workshop building near the naval hangar. The aircraft burst into flames on impact and was destroyed. Crash tenders responded swiftly and four of the victims, alive but critically injured, were moved to a hospital within 15 minutes of the crash.

== Investigation ==
The Directorate General of Civil Aviation ordered an investigation into the accident and a three-member Committee of Inquiry headed by Air Marshal P. Raj Kumar was constituted under the Aircraft Rules, 1937. The Committee in its report made 49 findings and 7 recommendations and stated that "poor aircraft maintenance practices at Short Haul Operations Department had contributed to the accident". It found that the aircraft had pitched up uncontrollably after takeoff and that this was the result of a "sudden uncommanded downward movement of the Trimmable Horizontal Stabilizer leading edge. This was due to partial detachment of its actuator forward bearing support fitting due to non-installation of required hi-lok fasteners." Consequently, the aircraft "stalled, fell to its right and crashed."

Indian Airlines paid ₹76.87 lakh (7,687,000, roughly US$195,000) as compensation to the victims and received ₹5 crore (50,000,000, US$1.27 million) from its insurers towards loss of the aircraft.
