= Wave power in India =

India has a long coastline of 7517 km marked along by numerous estuaries and gulfs which makes it attractive for the development of marine energy projects. India's wave power potential is around 40-60GW. However, compared to the developments in other renewable energy technologies, ocean energy technologies like wave and tidal are in their nascent stages of development in India.

== Resources ==
Wave power depends upon the height of the wave and its period. Primary estimates of wave energy potential along Indian coast is around 5-15 MW/m, so the theoretical estimated potential comes out to be around 40-60 GW. A study by IIT Madras and Credit Rating Information Services of Indian Ltd (CRISIL) have shown that western coast has higher wave power potential compared to eastern coast. They have identified potential locations for wave power development along the west coast of India in Maharashtra, Goa, Karnataka and Kerala. Kanyakumari located at the southern tip of Indian peninsula in the state of Tamilnadu has the highest power owing to the effects of refraction and strong winds. With currently available technologies, amount of power that can be generated using wave energy is much less than the theoretical estimated potential.

The capacity utilization factor for wave energy in India is in the range of 15-20%.

== Vizhinjam wave energy plant ==
Wave energy research in India was initiated in 1983 when the Department of Ocean Development of Government of India provided funds to Indian Institute of Technology, Madras, for carrying out the research. This led to the establishment of a 150 kW Pilot wave energy plant in 1991 at Vizhinjam in Thiruvananthapuram, Kerala.

Vizhinjam wave energy plant was the world's first wave power plant working on oscillating water column (OWC) technology. This technology utilizes the change in levels of water inside caisson as waves approach. As the water level increases in the caisson, the air inside is compressed, which is then used to drive an air turbine. The power generated from this plant, however, varied a lot throughout the year and maximum power was generated only during the monsoon months. After a long duration of being out of use, it was planned to be utilized for powering a Reverse Osmosis Desalination plant in 2004. This project also was not successful and the wave energy plant was finally decommissioned in 2011.

Vizhinjam Wave Power Plant in the background

== Economics ==
Wave energy is amongst the most capital intensive forms of renewable energy. The current cost of wave energy varies between 34 and 63 €c/kWh. According to a study by IIT Madras and CRISIL, wave energy technologies would require about 10 GW of cumulative capacity to become cost competitive.

== Benefits ==
Wave energy is a clean and renewable source of energy. Since waves are always present, wave power is more consistent in electricity generation when compared to renewable energy sources like wind and solar. They can be a good source of energy generation for off grid coastal areas and islands. Wave energy often used to power the desalination plants. Wave energy turbines when combined with offshore breakwaters can help achieve the protection of seashores.

== Challenges ==
There are several challenges that need to be addressed to make electricity generation from wave energy commercially viable. Technological challenges include low turbine efficiencies, high turbine costs, unavailability of grid connections at potential sites, lack of experience and unpredictable environmental conditions. Owing to inadequate data, it is challenging to estimate the impact of wave power generation on marine ecosystem. Moreover, investment in wave power is perceived as risky investment by financial institutions because of high capital cost and lack of operational experience.

== Administration and policy ==
The Ministry of Earth Sciences in Government of India oversees the development of wave energy in India with National Institute of Ocean Technology, Chennai (NIOT) being a participating institution. The ministry envisions development of wave energy to power low-temperature thermal desalination (LTTD) plants and to meet the lighting requirements of small islands.

India's government has set a target of achieving 40% cumulative electrical power capacity from non-fossil fuel resources by 2030. It plans to enhance the renewable power installed capacity to 175 GW by the end of 2022 which includes 60 GW from wind power, 100 GW from solar power, 10 GW from biomass power and 5 GW from small hydropower. There is however no specific target for wave power capacity enhancement.

== Sources ==
1. Bajpai, Neeraj (2017). "India takes giant leap on Green Energy Targets". Press Information Bureau | Government of India.
2. Study on Tidal & Waves Energy in India: Survey on the Potential & Proposition of a Roadmap (PDF). CRISIL. 2014.
3. "Ocean energy". Energy Alternatives India (EAI). 2017.
4. Husain, Majid (2014). Indian And World Geography. Mcgraw Hill Education (India). ISBN 978-9352607785.
