= Muralee Krishna S. =

Indian judge

The Honourable Justice Muralee Krishna S.

Judge of the Kerala High Court
- Incumbent
- Assumed office 30 October 2024
- Nominated by: D. Y. Chandrachud
- Appointed by: Droupadi Murmu

Personal details
- Pronunciation: Muralee Krishna S. മുരളീകൃഷ്ണ എസ്.
- Born: 24 May 1976 (age 50) Kasargod district Kerala
- Spouse: Archana K.
- Education: SDM Law College, Mangalore
- Website: High Court of Kerala

Muralee Krishna Shankaramoole is an Indian judge who is presently serving as a judge of Kerala High Court. The High Court of Kerala is the highest court in the Indian state of Kerala and in the Union Territory of Lakshadweep. The High Court of Kerala is headquartered at Ernakulam, Kochi.

== Early life and education ==
Muralee Krishna completed his schooling from DHSS, Hosdurg, graduation from Nehru Arts and Science College, Kanhangad and obtained graduation in Law from SDM Law College, Mangalore and Post Graduation in Law from Mahatma Gandhi University.

== Career ==
Muralee Krishna enrolled as an advocate and started practice in 1999 at Kasargod District mainly in civil and criminal matters. He was directly recruited from bar as District and Sessions judge in 2014. Served as Additional district and sessions judge, Kozhikode, Palakkad and Manjeri, District and Sessions Courts at Manjeri and Kozhikode and Additional Charge of District and Sessions Court of Kavaratti. He was elevated as additional judge of High Court of Kerala on 30 October 2024 and became permanent judge from 5 October 2026.
