= Laccadive Islands =

Laccadive Islands Kannur Islands
- Island subgroup
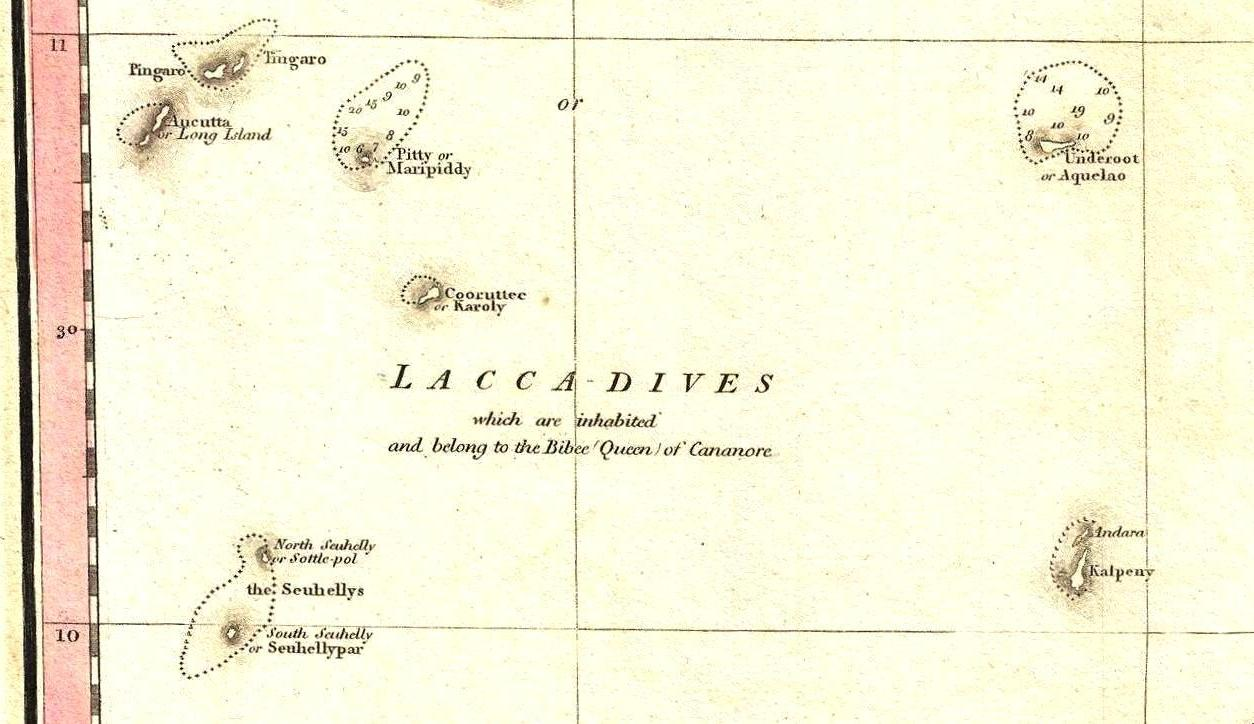
- The Laccadive subgroup on an 1800 map

- Laccadive Islands (India)
- Country: India
- Union Territory: Lakshadweep
- District: Lakshadweep

Area
  - Total: 17.5 km^{2} (6.8 sq mi)

Languages
  - Official: Malayalam
- Time zone: UTC+5:30 (IST)
- Vehicle registration: LD

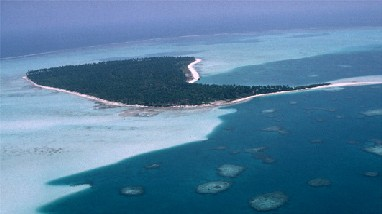
View of Kavaratti, one of the main islands of the subgroup.

The Laccadive Islands (/ˈlækədaɪv, -diːv/ LAK-ə-dyve, -deev) or Kannur Islands (formerly spelled Cannanore, /ˈkænənɔːr/ KAN-ə-nor) are one of the three island subgroups in the Union Territory of Lakshadweep, India. It is the central subgroup of the Lakshadweep, separated from the Amindivi Islands subgroup roughly by the 11th parallel north and from the atoll of Minicoy (Maliku)—far to the south—by the 9 Degree or Mamala Channel.

Formerly the Union Territory of Lakshadweep was known as Laccadive, Minicoy, and Amindivi Islands, a name that was changed to Lakshadweep by an act of Parliament in 1973.

The Laccadive subgroup are also known as the "Kannur/Cannanore Islands" after the coastal town of Kannur. The name originated in the fact that while the northern group of Amindivi had stopped in 1784 being a vassal state of the Kannur Kingdom (Arakkal) in exchange for fealty to Tippu Sultan's Kingdom of Mysore, the southern group remained loyal to Kannur.

== Geography ==
The Laccadive subgroup includes the island of Agatti, with Agatti Aerodrome, the only airport in Lakshadweep, as well as Bangaram Atoll which has a tourist resort in Bangaram, its largest island.

The Laccadive group forms two talukas or subdivisions: Androth, with a population of 15,048 and Kavaratti with 17,193. The islands of Agatti, Androth, Kavaratti and Kalpeni are inhabited. Islam is the main religion of the islanders.

The Laccadive Islands subgroup consists mostly of atolls with islands, as well as part of one submerged bank. The Amindivi and the Laccadive subgroups have a submarine connection between them through Pitti Bank, a largely sunken atoll.

Atoll/Reef/Bank (alternate name)	type	Land Area (km^{2})	Lagoon Area (km^{2})	No. of islets	Pop. Census 2001	Location
Laccadive Islands
Agatti Island (Agatti)	atoll	2.70	4.84	1	8,000	10°50′N 73°41′E
Bangaram Island (Bangaram)	atoll	2.30	4.84	1	61	10°50′N 73°41′E
Pitti Island^{1)}	islet^{1)}	0.01	155.09^{1)}	1	–	10°50′N 72°38′E
Androth Island (Andrott)	atoll	4.90	4.84	1	10,720	10°50′N 73°41′E
Kavaratti Island	atoll	4.22	4.96	1	10,113	10°33′N 72°38′E
Kalpeni Island	atoll	2.79	25.60	7	4,319	10°05′N 73°38′E
Suheli Par	atoll	0.57	78.76	2	–	10°05′N 72°17′E
^{1)} Amini Island and Pitti Island are both on Pitti Bank, a largely sunken atoll with a lagoon area of 155.09 km^{2}

== History ==
In the same manner as the Amindivi Islands further north, the islands of the Laccadive subgroup were settled from ancient times by people of nearby Kerala to which were added later people of Arab descent. Vasco da Gama visited these islands around 1498. In the mid 16th century all the inhabited islands of the Lakshadweep put themselves under the rule of the Arakkal kingdom in order to obtain protection from the Portuguese.

In 1697, the notorious pirate Captain Kidd and his crew brought their ship, the Adventure Galley, to the Laccadive Islands. The undisciplined crew chopped up the local boats for firewood, and raped the local women. When the men retaliated by killing the ship's cooper, the pirates attacked the village and beat up the people who lived there.

Almost 100 years later—in 1784—the Amindivi group of islands rejected the protection of Cannanore and became a vassal state of the Kingdom of Mysore. The southern group, however, remained loyal to the rule of Cannanore.

Following the defeat of Tipu Sultan and the 1792 treaty of Srirangapatam, the southern subgroup was permitted by the East India Company to remain under the rule of the Cannanore Kingdom in exchange for a yearly tribute of 15,000 Rs. Since the tributary payments were often in arrears, the islands were put under direct rule of the British Government, first between 1855 and 1860, and then finally were annexed in 1877 by virtue of the doctrine of lapse, becoming attached to the Malabar District.

== Bibliography ==
- R. H. Ellis, A Short Account of the Laccadive Islands and Minicoy. Government Press, Madras. 1924
