= Low-temperature thermal desalination =

Water purification technique

Low-temperature thermal desalination (LTTD) is a desalination technique which takes advantage of the fact that water evaporates at lower temperatures at low pressures, even as low as ambient temperature. The system uses vacuum pumps to create a low pressure, low-temperature environment in which water evaporates even at a temperature difference of 8 °C (14 °F) between two volumes of water. Cooling water is supplied from deep sea depths of as much as 600 metres (2,000 ft). This cold water is pumped through coils to condense the water vapor. The resulting condensate is purified water. It is often used in regions with limited freshwater resources and access to abundant seawater, particularly in coastal areas and island territories.

== Using waste heat ==
The LTTD process may also take advantage of the temperature gradient available at thermal power plants, where large quantities of warm cooling water are discharged from the plant, reducing the energy input needed to create a temperature gradient. This technique of making use of waste heat is a form of cogeneration. The first documented application of this concept dates back to 1992, with the start-up and successful operation of a seawater distillation plant rated at 500 m^{3}/day (named "Low Temperature Flash", LTF) installed in Piombino power plant (Italy).

== History ==
The principle of LTTD has been known for some time, originally stemming from ocean thermal energy conversion research. Some experiments were conducted in the U.S. and Japan to test low-temperature-driven desalination technology. In Japan, a spray flash evaporation system was developed by Saga University. In the U.S. state of Hawai'i, the Natural Energy Laboratory of Hawaii Authority tested an open-cycle OTEC plant with cogeneration of fresh water and electric energy, using a temperature difference of 20 °C (36 °F) between surface water and water at a depth of around 500 metres (1,600 ft).

== Research in India and pilot plants ==
LTTD was studied by India's National Institute of Ocean Technology (NIOT) from 2004. Their first LTTD plant was opened in 2005 at Kavaratti in the Lakshadweep islands. The plant's capacity is 100,000 litres (22,000 imp gal; 26,000 US gal)/day, at a capital cost of ₹50 million (€922,000). The plant uses deep sea water at a temperature of 7 to 15 °C (45 to 59 °F). In 2007, NIOT opened an experimental floating LTTD plant off the coast of Chennai with a capacity of 1,000,000 litres (220,000 imp gal; 260,000 US gal)/day. A smaller plant was established in 2009 at the North Chennai Thermal Power Station (a coal-fired power plant) to test the concept using power plant cooling water.
