= Kavaratti =

Island capital of Lakshadweep, India

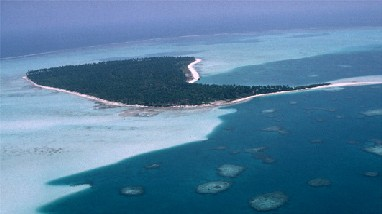
- Kavaratti Island

- Location within India Location within Lakshadweep

Geography
- Location: Arabian Sea
- Coordinates: 10.57°N 72.64°E
- Archipelago: Lakshadweep
- Adjacent to: Indian Ocean
- Total islands: 1
- Major islands: Kavaratti
- Area: 4.22 km^{2} (1.63 sq mi)
- Length: 5.8 km (3.6 mi)
- Width: 1.6 km (0.99 mi)
- Coastline: 6 km (3.7 mi)
- Highest elevation: 5 m (16 ft)

Administration
- India
- Union territory: Lakshadweep
- District: Lakshadweep
- Island group: Laccadive Islands
- Tehsil: Kavaratti
- Largest settlement: Kavaratti

Demographics
- Population: 11,210 (2011)
- Pop. density: 2,920/km^{2} (7560/sq mi)
- Ethnic groups: Malayali, Mahls

Additional information
- Time zone: IST (UTC+5:30)
- PIN: 682555
- Telephone code: 04896
- ISO code: IN-LD-05
- Official website: lakshadweep.nic.in/ISLAND_web/kavaratti/index.htm
- Literacy: 88.6%
- Avg. summer temperature: 35 °C (95 °F)
- Avg. winter temperature: 25 °C (77 °F)
- Sex ratio: 1.227 ♂/♀

Kavaratti (/kʌvəˈrʌti/, Malayalam: [kɐʋɐɾɐt̪ːi]) is an atoll in the Indian Union Territory of Lakshadweep. The census town of Kavaratti, which is the major settlement in the atoll, serves as the capital of Lakshadweep. It is located about 360 km (220 mi) west of the Malabar coast in mainland India.

== Etymology ==
The name Kavaratti might derive from Malayalam or Jeseri indicating a settlement near a lagoon.

== Geography ==
The atoll of Kavaratti lies 360 km (220 mi) off the Malabar coast of mainland India. The island is 5.6 km (3.5 mi) long, and 1.6 km (0.99 mi) wide, and occupies an area of 4.22 km^{2} (1.63 sq mi). It is surrounded by a 6 km (3.7 mi) long lagoon with an area of 4.96 km^{2} (1.92 sq mi). It is located to the east of Agatti and to the west of Andrott islands. The island gently slopes from the west to east, with an average altitude of 2 to 5 m (6 ft 7 in to 16 ft 5 in) on the west and 2 to 3 m (6 ft 7 in to 9 ft 10 in) on the eastern side. The soil is mostly sandy or loamy. Kavaratti has an inland lake in the northern part of the island and numerous small ponds and wells. The island is surrounded by coral reefs that support various marine life.

== Climate ==
Kavaratti has a tropical savanna climate (Köppen Aw). The summer months of March to May are the hottest of the year. The average temperature ranges between 25 to 35 °C (77 to 95 °F) across the year, with a high humidity of 70 to 76 percent.

Kavaratti receives about 1,600 mm (63 in) of rainfall annually mostly from the southwest monsoon from mid of May to September. The sea level often raises during the period, and boats are limited to the lagoon area, which are protected by the reefs surrounding them.

Climate data for Kavaratti
Month	Jan	Feb	Mar	Apr	May	Jun	Jul	Aug	Sep	Oct	Nov	Dec	Year
Mean daily maximum °C (°F)	30.2 (86.4)	30.4 (86.7)	31.1 (88.0)	31.8 (89.2)	31.3 (88.3)	30.4 (86.7)	29.8 (85.6)	29.7 (85.5)	29.8 (85.6)	30.0 (86.0)	30.3 (86.5)	30.3 (86.5)	30.4 (86.7)
Mean daily minimum °C (°F)	23.7 (74.7)	24.1 (75.4)	24.3 (75.7)	26.5 (79.7)	26.1 (79.0)	25.7 (78.3)	25.4 (77.7)	25.1 (77.2)	24.8 (76.6)	24.5 (76.1)	24.3 (75.7)	24.0 (75.2)	24.3 (75.7)
Average rainfall mm (inches)	27.4 (1.08)	25.4 (1.00)	19.8 (0.78)	72.5 (2.85)	212.8 (8.38)	261.3 (10.29)	250.9 (9.88)	202.4 (7.97)	181.9 (7.16)	183.1 (7.21)	133.0 (5.24)	94.8 (3.73)	1,665.3 (65.57)

== Demographics ==
As per the 2011 Census of India, Kavaratti had a population of 11,210 of which 6,171 were males and 5,039 were females, living in 2,246 households. The literacy was 91.59% with a male literacy rate of 95.37%, and female literacy was 86.93%. In Kavaratti, 10.3% of the population were under six years.

The most commonly spoken languages were Malayalam, Mahl, English and the native Jeseri. Islam was the major religion with 92% adherents, with Hinduism being the other significant religion with 7% adherents.

== Administration ==
Kavaratti serves as the capital of Lakshadweep. Lakshadweep is a union territory and is governed by an administrator on behalf of the Government of India. The headquarters of the union territory were at Kozhikode until 1964, when the seat of the administrator of the islands was shifted to Kavaratti. The entire island group constitutes a single Indian district, with headquarters at Kavaratti.

Kavaratti is the headquarters of one of the ten administrative sub-divisions. Village panchayat is the local administrative body of the island. The Kavaratti community development block is administered by a collector-cum-development commissioner, who is in charge of revenue and land settlement, and also serves as a district magistrate. The administrator acts as the Inspector General of Police and has command and control of the Lakshadweep Police, headquartered at Kavaratti, and is responsible for law and order. There is a district and sessions court in Kavaratti (established in 1997).

== Economy ==
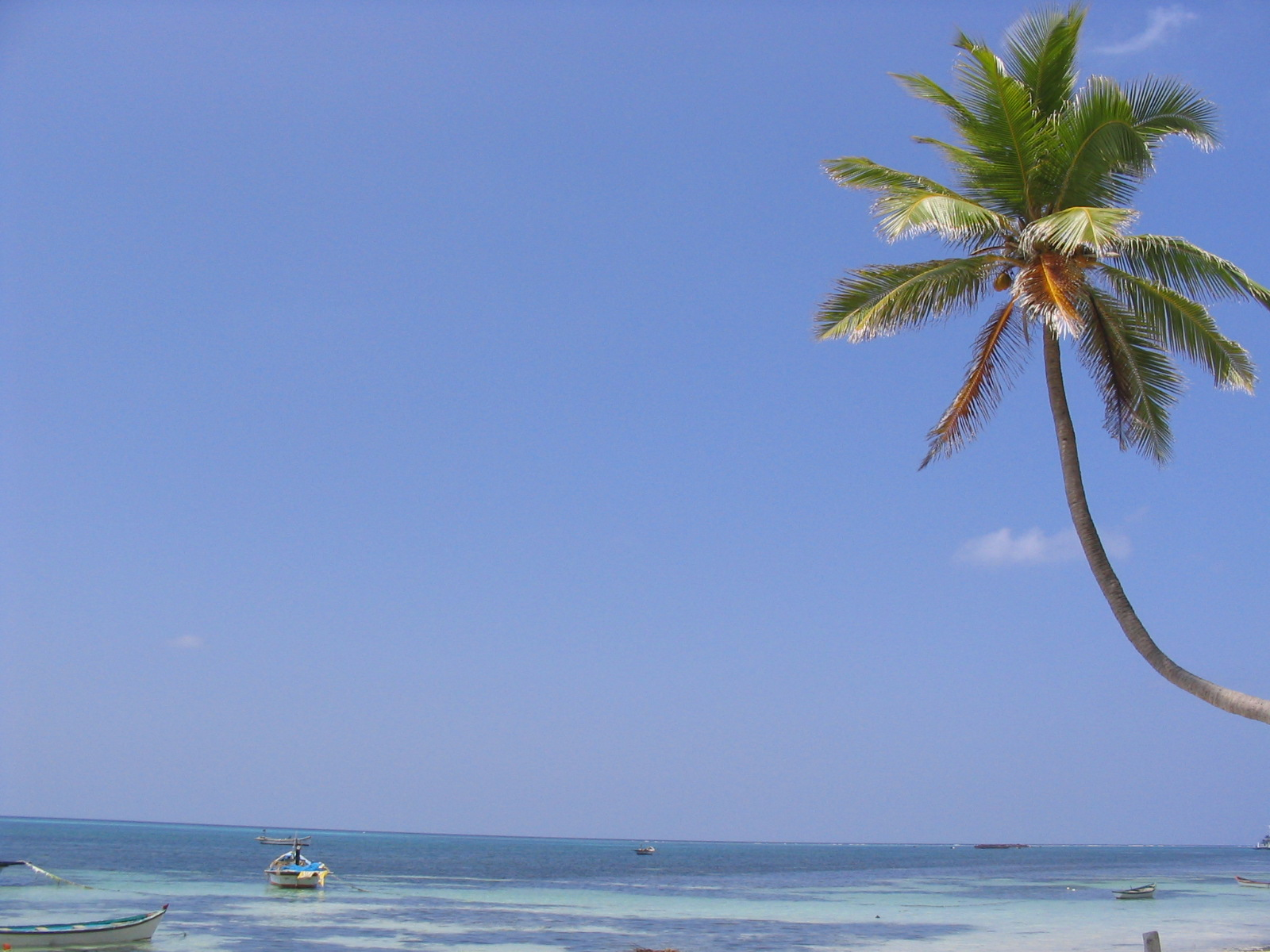
View from a beach at Kavaratti

Tourism is one of the primary economic drivers on the island. The island has white sand beaches, favored by tourists. According to government statistics, there were about 17,759 tourist visits over a nine month period from October 2017 to June 2018, which included 365 foreigners. The government is promoting tourism as a means to increase the income of the local population, with facilities established for various water sports. Tourists require permission to visit the island, and alcoholic beverage consumption is not permitted. In 2024, the government proposed further programmes to improve infrastructure and promote tourism.

The other major industries on the island are fisheries and agriculture. While rice and other crops were cultivated earlier in low-lying water logged lands called "thottams", it was discontinued due to ecological limitations. At present, the only major agriculture produce is coconuts, with various coconut fibre (coir) producing units located in Kavaratti. Tuna forms the major part of the fish produce, with an annual production of over 700 tonnes.

== Transportation ==
The only airport in the Lakshadweep islands is the Agatti Airport on Agatti Island. The airport is capable of handling small turboprop aircraft, which connect to mainland India, with further connectivity by helicopter or boat from Agatti to Kavaratti. The atoll has a minor port, and various ships operate passenger services between Kochi and Kavaratti, with boat/ferry services available between the islands. There is a lighthouses on the island. The Indian Navy operates the INS Dweeprakshak naval base on the atoll. In 2024, plans were unveiled for a new peripheral ring road at Kavaratti.

== Infrastructure ==
In 1964, Kavaratti was the second island after Minicoy to be electrified, and is powered by an independent power house located on the atoll. Diesel generators and solar photovoltaic systems generate the required electricity. In January 2024, a solar power plant was commissioned to augment the power generation capacity.

The world's first ever experimental low-temperature thermal desalination plant opened in Kavaratti in 2005, with a projected daily production capacity of 100,000 litres of potable water from seawater. The plant utilises the temperature difference between warm surface seawater and much colder seawater at about 500 m (1,600 ft) depth to generate potable water as well as energy. The technology was developed at the National Institute of Ocean Technology and the government has announced plans to build three more such plants.

Mobile communication service is provided by state-owned BSNL and Airtel in Kavratti. In 2020, the government announced a project to install under-sea fiber optic cable for high-speed mobile and internet connectivity between Kochi and 11 islands of Lakshadweep including Kavaratti, which was inaugurated in January 2024. India Post provides mail service, and government operated hospital provide healthcare services. The first bank branch was established by Syndicate Bank in 1971, and the State Bank of India opened a branch in Kavaratti in 2005. These branches serve as central banking facilities for banking services across the Lakshadweep islands.

== Education ==
Government operated schools provide school education in Kavaratti. There are two government colleges, including a teacher training institute, affiliated to Pondicherry University and a university center affiliated to Calicut University.
