= Agatti Island =

Island in India

Agatti
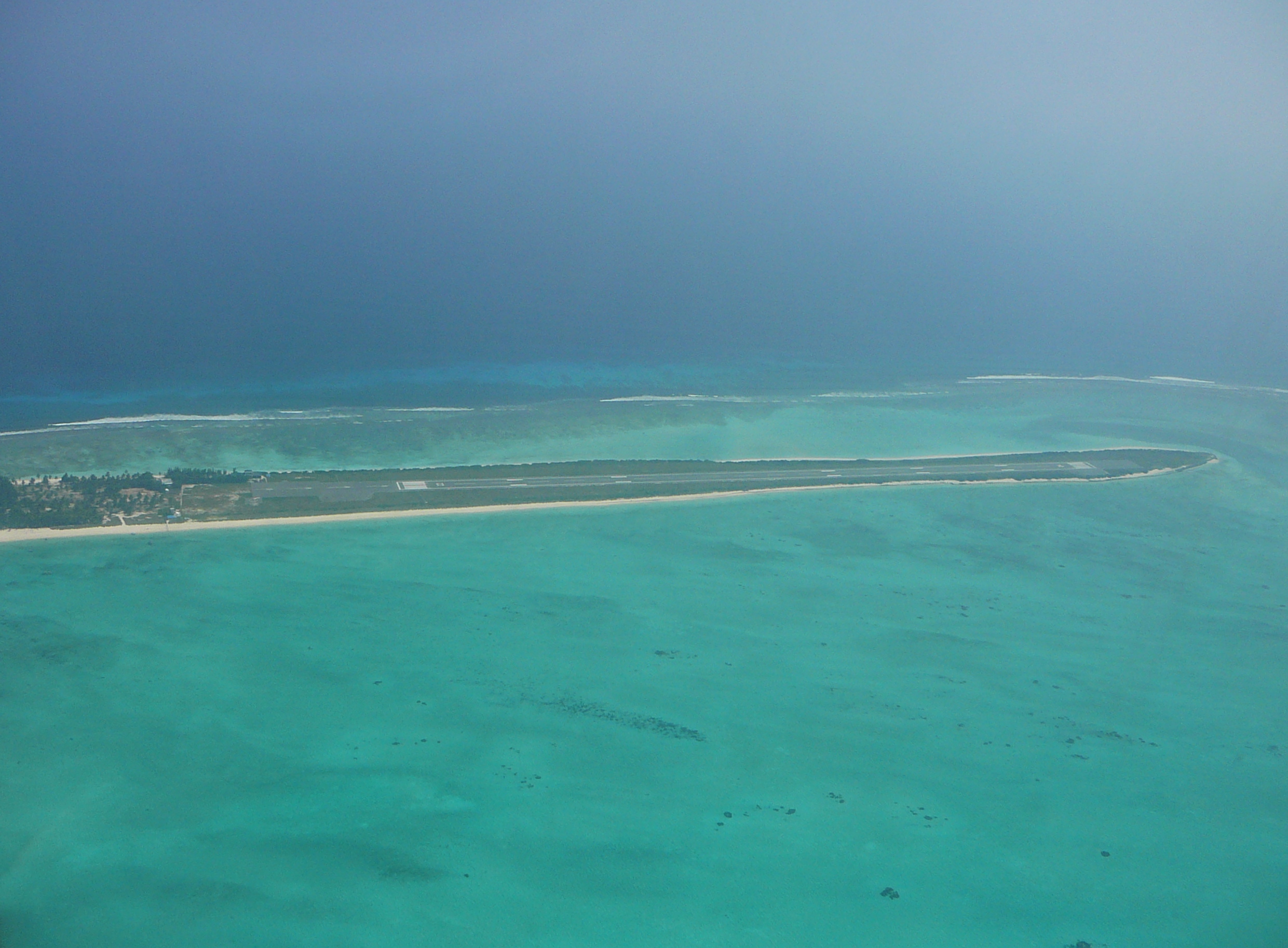
- Agatti Airport

- Location within India Location within Lakshadweep

Geography
- Location: Arabian Sea
- Coordinates: 10.85°N 72.19°E
- Type: Atoll
- Archipelago: Lakshadweep
- Adjacent to: Indian Ocean
- Total islands: 2
- Major islands: Agatti Island; Kalpatti Island
- Area: 3.226 km^{2} (1.246 sq mi)
- Length: 7.6 km (4.72 mi)
- Width: 0.85 km (0.528 mi)
- Coastline: 17 km (10.6 mi)
- Highest elevation: 2 m (7 ft)

Administration
- India
- Territory: Union territory of Lakshadweep
- District: Lakshadweep
- Island group: Laccadive Islands
- Tehsils of India: Kavaratti
- Subdivisions of India: Agatti Island
- Largest settlement: Agatti (pop. 7500)

Demographics
- Population: 7700 (2014)
- Pop. density: 2,386/km^{2} (6180/sq mi)
- Ethnic groups: Malayali, Mahls

Additional information
- Time zone: IST (UTC+5:30)
- PIN: 682553
- Telephone code: 04894
- ISO code: IN-LD-06
- Official website: www.lakshadweep.gov.in
- Literacy: 84.4%
- Avg. summer temperature: 32.0 °C (89.6 °F)
- Avg. winter temperature: 28.0 °C (82.4 °F)
- Sex ratio: 1.059♂/♀

Agatti Island (Malayalam: [ɐɡɐt̪ːi]) is a 7.6 km long island, situated on a coral atoll called Agatti atoll in the Union Territory of Lakshadweep, India. It is 459 km (285 mi) west of the city of Kochi.

== Geography ==
Agatti is located about 364 km off Kannur, 394 km off Kozhikode, and 459 km (285 mi) off Kochi in the mainland and 7 km to the southwest of Bangaram, the nearest island. Agatti is 531 km away from Kollam and 529 km away from Kollam Port. Kavaratti, the closest inhabited island, lies 54 km to the SE and Suheli Par atoll 76 km to the south. Agatti Atoll's total land area is 3.226 km^{2} (1.246 sq mi) (of it, the main island has 3.141 km^{2} (1.213 sq mi) and the small Kalpatti Island has 0.085 km^{2} (0.033 sq mi). Kalpatti is located at the southern end on the same reef. The lagoon area is 24.84 km^{2} (9.59 sq mi).

== Climate ==
Climate data for Agatti Island (Agatti Airport) 1991–2020, extremes 1996–2012
Month	Jan	Feb	Mar	Apr	May	Jun	Jul	Aug	Sep	Oct	Nov	Dec	Year
Record high °C (°F)	35.3 (95.5)	35.3 (95.5)	38.0 (100.4)	37.8 (100.0)	37.0 (98.6)	37.8 (100.0)	32.7 (90.9)	34.8 (94.6)	33.3 (91.9)	35.0 (95.0)	35.0 (95.0)	36.3 (97.3)	38.0 (100.4)
Mean daily maximum °C (°F)	31.2 (88.2)	31.5 (88.7)	32.4 (90.3)	33.2 (91.8)	33.0 (91.4)	31.3 (88.3)	30.6 (87.1)	30.6 (87.1)	30.6 (87.1)	31.0 (87.8)	31.5 (88.7)	31.4 (88.5)	31.5 (88.7)
Mean daily minimum °C (°F)	25.8 (78.4)	26.0 (78.8)	26.9 (80.4)	28.0 (82.4)	27.8 (82.0)	26.0 (78.8)	25.8 (78.4)	25.7 (78.3)	25.7 (78.3)	26.1 (79.0)	26.3 (79.3)	26.1 (79.0)	26.4 (79.5)
Record low °C (°F)	22.5 (72.5)	23.5 (74.3)	24.2 (75.6)	23.2 (73.8)	22.1 (71.8)	22.3 (72.1)	22.7 (72.9)	22.5 (72.5)	22.7 (72.9)	22.2 (72.0)	22.1 (71.8)	22.8 (73.0)	22.1 (71.8)
Average rainfall mm (inches)	11.0 (0.43)	3.4 (0.13)	5.6 (0.22)	8.0 (0.31)	155.9 (6.14)	340.1 (13.39)	315.3 (12.41)	229.3 (9.03)	172.4 (6.79)	167.4 (6.59)	95.8 (3.77)	68.7 (2.70)	1,572.9 (61.93)
Average rainy days	0.7	0.2	0.6	0.9	6.0	16.1	15.5	12.8	10.6	9.4	5.0	2.8	80.4
Average relative humidity (%) (at 17:30 IST)	69	69	68	68	71	80	80	79	78	76	75	71	74
Source: India Meteorological Department

== Population ==
Religion in Agatti Island (2011)
1. Islam (96.8%)
2. Hinduism (2.68%)
3. Christianity (0.28%)
4. Not Stated (0.24%)

Its population in the 2011 census was 7,560, and Islam is the main religion of the islanders. Islamic religion is said to have been brought by Arab traveller Ibn Batuta. Most people speak Malayalam, English and Tamil. Agatti has its own 100 kW powerhouse which uses fuel to generate electricity. There is a desalination unit which provides desalinated water to the islanders.

== Transportation ==
=== Sea ===
Lakshadweep is connected to Cochin by sea route. Seven passenger ships operate between the two ports and it takes 14–20 hours for the passage.

=== Air ===
The 1,400 metres (4,600 ft) Agatti Airport (IATA: AGX, ICAO: VOAT) is the only airport in Lakshadweep.

== Tourism ==
Agatti is one of the Lakshadweep islands open to tourism. Visitors, however, are allowed to the Island under certain restrictions. They are required to obtain Entry Permit from the Lakshadweep Administration for entering or visiting the island. Entry Permit is issued based on the visitor having a confirmed place to stay. There are only two hotels or resorts in Agatti: Agatti Island Beach Resort (AIBER) and the other is Sea Shells Beach Resort. A road runs through the island, which can be best enjoyed by hiring a bicycle available at many places.

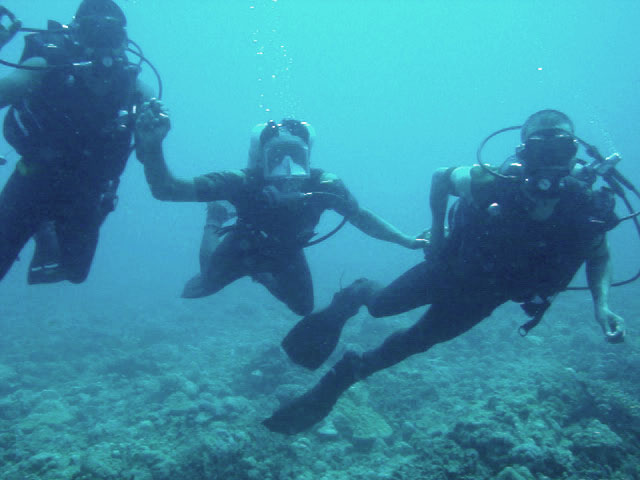
Scuba in Agatti

Water sports activities such as scuba diving, wind surfing, snorkeling, surfing, kayaking, canoeing, water skiing, sportfishing, yachting and night sea voyages are popular activities among tourists. Tourists flock to these islands throughout the year, except during the southwest monsoon months when seas are extremely rough.

== Administration ==
The island belongs to the township of Agatti Island of Kavaratti Tehsil.
