= Agatti Airport =

Airport serving Lakshadweep, India

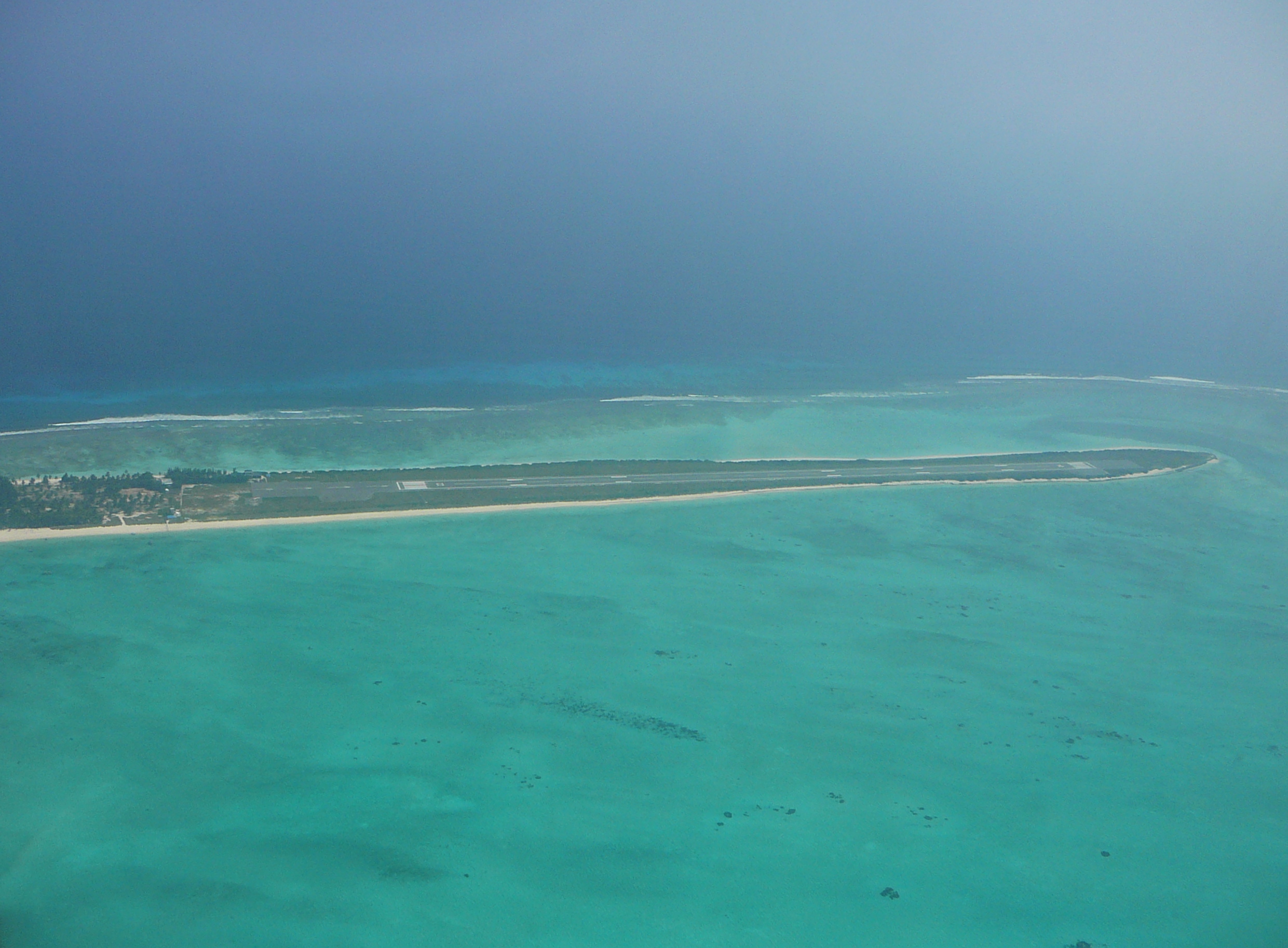
- IATA: AGX; ICAO: VOAT

Summary
- Airport type: Public
- Operator: Airports Authority of India
- Serves: Lakshadweep
- Location: Agatti Island, Lakshadweep, India
- Opened: 16 April 1988; 38 years ago
- Time zone: IST (UTC+05:30)
- Elevation AMSL: 4 m (13 ft)
- Coordinates: 10°49′41″N 72°10′44″E
- Website: Agatti Airport

Map
- Location of the airport in Lakshadweep AGX (India)

Runways
Direction	Length		Surface
Direction	m	ft	Surface
04/22	1,291	4,235	Asphalt

Statistics (April 2025 - March 2026)
- Passengers: 136,680 (▲16.4%)
- Aircraft movements: 3,774 (▼0.2%)
- Cargo tonnage: 0 (▼100%)
- Source: AAI

Agatti Airport (IATA: AGX, ICAO: VOAT) is a regional airport serving the union territory of Lakshadweep, India. It is located at the southern end of Agatti Island, and is the sole airstrip in the archipelago, which lies off the west coast of mainland India.

== History ==
The airstrip was constructed during 1987−88 for operation of Dornier 228 type of aircraft and was inaugurated on 16 April 1988. Initially, the terminal was housed in a small temporary structure. Construction of the terminal building, Air Traffic Control (ATC) tower and related structures commenced in 2006. However, the construction of the terminal building was stopped midway due to the proposed extension of the runway. After the works were completed, Air India Regional began services with ATR-42 aircraft on 24 September 2010 connecting Agatti with Kochi. The resurfacing of the runway was completed in November 2010. The airline was renamed later as Alliance Air, which now operates its ATR-72 aircraft from the airport to Bengaluru and Kochi.

== Structure ==
Agatti airport is spread over 18.56 hectares (45.9 acres). It has one asphalt runway, oriented 04/22, 1204 metres long and 30 metres wide, while its terminal building can handle 50 passengers during peak hours. Navigational aids include a DME and NDB. It is operated by the Airports Authority of India (AAI).

== Expansion plans ==
In 2013, the Airports Authority of India (AAI) received environmental clearance to extend the runway by constructing a 1,500-foot-long bridge on stilts over the sea. The extension is to be built at a cost of Rs 3 billion and will allow aircraft like the ATR-72 to be operated without any payload restrictions. AAI originally planned to construct a bridge between Agatti and the neighbouring uninhabited Kalpati Island to make the runway long enough to handle an Airbus A320 or Boeing 737. However, this plan was rejected on environmental grounds as the bridge would have gone through a turtle colony and Kalpati Island would need to be levelled to accommodate the extended runway.

As per the revised master plan, the following works will be undertaken:

- The existing runway will be extended by 336 metres in the south-west direction over the lagoon towards Kalpati Island without interconnecting the two islands.
- Construction of a new terminal building, an ATC tower cum technical block and Fire Station in the north-west direction by constructing a platform supported by reinforced cement concrete pillars on the lagoon.
- A fully air-conditioned terminal building covering 2250 square metres to cater for 150 passengers at a time (75 arriving and 75 departing).
- The existing control tower cum fire station and existing terminal building that falls inside of the proposed basic strip will be demolished.
- A new 118×62-metre apron suitable for parking two ATR-72 aircraft with power-in and power-out configuration will be constructed on a platform supported by RCC pillars in the lagoon.
- A Runway End Safety Area (RESA) measuring 60×90 metres and a Blast Pad/Overrun area measuring 60×30 metres.
- A 73-metre long taxiway from the runway to the apron.
- A parking area for 75 cars about 2,000 square metres (22,000 sq ft).
- A proposed DVOR and NDB navigational aids to be placed on Kalpati Island.

On 18 July 2024, the Government of India had cleared the proposal of the expansion of the airport along with the construction of a new airport in Minicoy. This will make the airport a tri-service military base with a civilian air enclave. The airbase will be capable of operating fighter jets, long-range UAVs and military transport aircraft. The project is led by the Indian Air Force and will be used by all the branches of the Armed Forces and the Indian Coast Guard.

== Airlines and destinations ==
Airlines	Destinations
Alliance Air	Bengaluru, Kochi
FLY91	Bengaluru (begins 12 November 2026), Goa–Mopa, Kochi, Navi Mumbai
IndiGo	Bengaluru, Kochi, Kozhikode

== Statistics ==
FY Annual Passengers
Year	Passengers
2023–24	47,266
2024–25	117,409

== See also ==
- List of airports in India
