= Littoral South Asia =

South Asian subregion bordering the Indian Ocean

Littoral South Asia or Maritime South Asia is the region of the Indian subcontinent which borders the Indian Ocean. It includes the South Asian republics of Bangladesh, India, and Pakistan, as well as the South Asian island countries of the Maldives and Sri Lanka. It is contested between China and India as a part of what is sometimes referred to as an alleged "String of Pearls" strategy by China to contain India. This has resulted in an increasing maritime collaboration between the United States and India.

The effects of climate change, such as flooding, are also expected to cause hundreds of millions of dollars of damage per year to coastal cities and potentially create tens of millions of climate migrants.

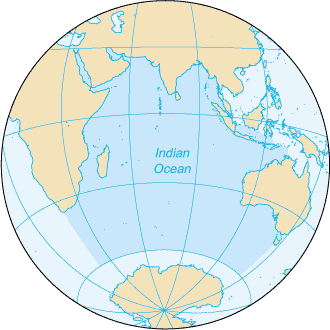

== See also ==
- Coastal India
- Indian maritime history
- Southern South Asia
