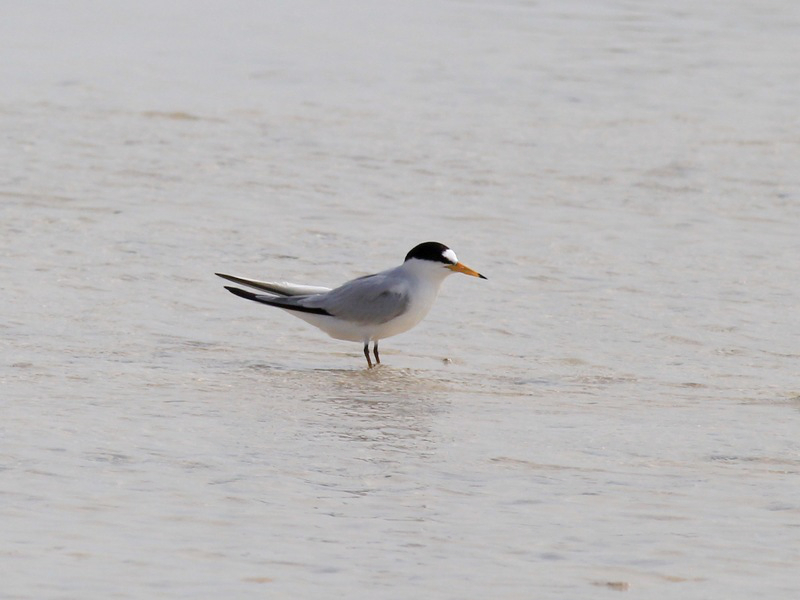
- Saunders's tern, Saudi Arabia

Conservation status
- Least Concern (IUCN 3.1)

Scientific classification
- Kingdom: Animalia
- Phylum: Chordata
- Class: Aves
- Order: Charadriiformes
- Family: Laridae
- Genus: Sternula
- Species: S. saundersi

Binomial name
- Sternula saundersi (Hume, 1877)

Synonyms
- Sterna saundersi, Black-shafted tern

= Saunders's tern =

Species of bird

Saunders's tern (Sternula saundersi), sometimes known as the black-shafted tern, is a species of bird in the family Laridae. It is sparsely resident along the shores of the northwestern Indian Ocean (namely southern Somalia, Arabian Peninsula, Socotra, Pakistan, Andaman and Nicobar Islands, and northern Sri Lanka).

It is a close relative of the little tern (S. albifrons), least tern (S. antillarum), yellow-billed tern (S. superciliaris), and Peruvian tern (S. lorata). In Depending on their plumage, Saunders's tern, little tern, and least tern may be almost indistinguishable, a similarity that has caused significant confusion in historical records. Like many seabirds, Saunders’s terns are ground-nesting, and demonstrate biparental care of their semi-precocial chicks. Moreover, they are opportunistic predators that feed on a wide variety of prey.

Saunders’s tern is ranked as "least concern" on the IUCN Red List, though insufficient population data makes this designation debatable.

== Taxonomy ==
Terns are seabirds related to gulls and skimmers, belonging together in the family Laridae within the order Charadriiformes. They are classified under the tribe Sternini, with the majority of larger terns falling within the genus Sterna, and Saunders’s tern under the smaller genus of white terns, Sternula. Saunders’s tern is most closely related to its sister species, the least tern, with the two being differentiated by their unique geographic distributions and plumages.

Saunders's tern was first described in 1877 by British botanist and ornithologist Allan Octavian Hume during his stay in British India as part of the Imperial Civil Service. It was originally given the name black-shafted ternlet (Sterna saundersi) by Hume, which was later changed to its present name.

Saunders's tern was previously considered to be a Red Sea subspecies of the little tern under the trinomial name S. a. saundersi. However, genetic analysis revealed Saunders's tern to be a single, monotypic species, and they are now considered to be separate.

== Description ==
=== Morphology ===
Saunders’s terns share the general morphology of other terns within Sternidae. They have a streamlined, aerodynamic shape with wings that end in pointed tips. Their wings are longer and more slender in proportion to their body than gulls'. Saunders's tern is 20–28 cm (8–11 in) long, weighs 40–45 grams (1.4–1.6 oz), and possesses a wingspan of 50–55 cm (20–22 in). It has an average wing length of 16.6 cm (6.5 in), bill length of 2.8 cm (1.1 in), and a forked tail with a depth of about 2.8 cm (1.1 in). Males and females are nearly indistinguishable in both morphology and plumage.

=== Plumage and similar species ===
The adult Saunders's tern closely resembles the little tern, featuring a white body, a black-tipped yellow bill, and a black cap. However, its white forehead patch does not extend above or behind the eye, distinguishing it from the little tern. In its breeding plumage, it distinguishes itself with a straight-bordered forehead patch, possessing more black outer primaries, and duskier colored legs and feet in comparison to the bright yellow legs of the little tern. When standing, the flight feathers on their folded wings form a distinct dark wedge.

Non-breeding Saunders’s terns have more blackish legs, messier or speckled head markings, and darker bills. Juveniles are generally pale, and have an almost-white top of the head with limited grey shading or streaking. The rest of their upperparts are also weakly marked, contrasting the adults’ solid white or pale-grey body. Though slightly lighter than in adults, juveniles maintain a darker line through the eye.

Saunders's terns' non-breeding and juvenile plumages are most similar to the least tern’s, yet the Saunders’s tern generally has a paler appearance, whiter crown, indistinct white eyebrow, and more prominent white border on its primaries.

=== Moult ===
Like the majority of birds belonging to the Sterinae family, Saunders’s tern exhibits waves of moult: unlike birds that replace their flight feathers once yearly, many terns replace a variable number of their inner primary and outer secondary feathers multiple times in an annual cycle; though the number of waves of these moults has yet to be determined for Saunders’s tern. They are observed in a range of plumages throughout all months, from non-breeding to full breeding.

=== Vocalisations ===
The Saunders’s tern’s calls consist of sharp kips or wips. Their vocalisations closely resemble those of the little tern; however, it is described as being less intense and "lacking the same urgency".

== Distribution and habitat ==
Saunders’s terns breed in small colonies along the coasts of the Middle East, in the southeastern part of the Western Palearctic. Though the Saunders’s tern range and migratory behaviours are not yet fully resolved, they appear to range from locally resident to long-distance migrants.

Their wintering range likely includes the Central Indian Ocean, Seychelles, Madagascar, the West coast of India, and the Cocos (Keeling) Islands, which represent their southeastern limit. Small numbers have also been noted in the Comoros, Mauritius, and Rodrigues. Their breeding range is large and encompasses the coasts of the Red Sea and the Persian Gulf to southwest India, Sri Lanka, and the Maldives. Some populations of Saunders’s terns found in the southern Red Sea, Somalia, and Socotra are considered to be resident, where they are thought to remain in the same geographic region and breed year-round.

Saunders’s terns are rarely found nesting inland, instead choosing to remain on beaches. Their populations are found in marine coastal environments, preferring to nest in bare sandy patches.

== Behavior and ecology ==
=== Breeding ===
Saunders’s terns breed annually, nesting either on flat ground or in sand mounds. They nest in small, loose colonies of five to 30 pairs, and their nests are commonly spaced 20–100 m apart.

Each female lays a small clutch of one to two eggs, and the breeding male and female pair show biparental care; while one parent remains at the nest to incubate the eggs, the other will bring food for its mate^{10}. If the incubating parent experiences high risks of predation of extreme ambient temperatures, then may abandon their eggs, and the nest will fail.

When the eggs hatch, their chicks are born semi-precocial, and they rely heavily on the parents for care and feeding. As such, the parents will continue to tend to the nest after hatching, feeding their chicks and defending the nest from predation until the offspring gain full independence. In the presence of predators, chicks will display evasive behaviours by moving between vegetation and other protective structures to evade capture.

=== Feeding ===
The majority of the Saunders's tern's diet consists of various marine animals, including small fish, crustaceans, and mollusks. It will also eat several varieties of insects. When foraging, an individual will hover above the water for a sizable amount of time, before making a plunge dive to catch fish.

=== Threats ===
Saunders’s terns breed in harsh coastal environments where their nests any cover, meaning they entirely exposed to extreme environmental and ecological stressors. As such, their nests are susceptible to predation by mammals and other birds of prey, as well as exposure to extreme heat. Anthropogenic stressors, including vehicle movement, vehicle noises, and predation from feral cats, also directly cause nest failure. Moreover, like many tern species, Saunders’s terns are also vulnerable to egg collection by humans.

At larger scales, Saunders's terns are vulnerable to many of the same threats that impact other coastal bird species, including habitat degradation and loss—notably through coastal and wetland development—introduced predators, declines in prey species, accidental capture during fishing, intensifying severe weather, and pollution.

== Status ==
Saunders's tern is a widely distributed species, and is not assessed as being close to the threshold of vulnerability. Its conservation status has thus been assessed as "least concern" on the IUCN Red List. However, their population numbers vary from small to large depending on the region, and some show signs of decline due to disturbance and predation at nesting sites.

Population data for the Saunders's tern is scarce, and historical accounts of the species are often inaccurate due to the systematic misrecording of little terns and least terns as Saunders's terns. Therefore, population sizes and ranges for the Saunders's tern are overestimated, and their listed conservation status is likely misrepresentative of their true populations' abundances and trends.
