= Coastal India =

Region bordering the Indian coastline

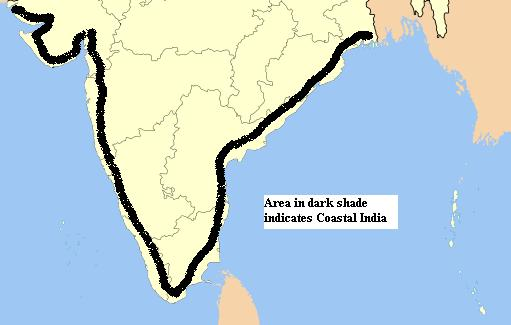
Coastal India

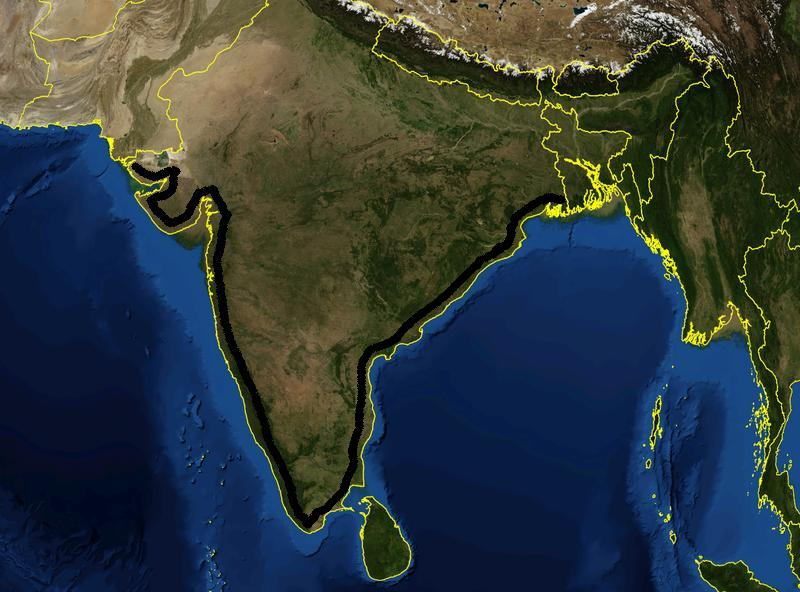
Satellite Picture of Coastal India.

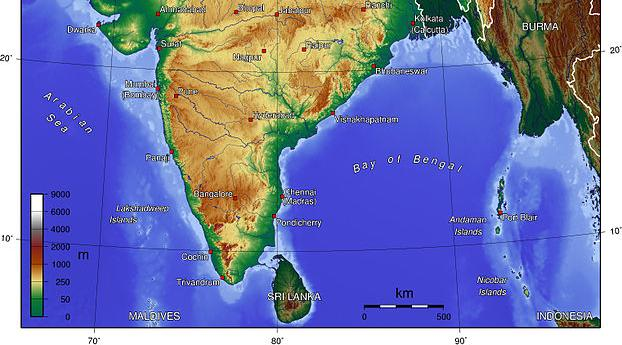
Map of Coastal India with major landmarks.

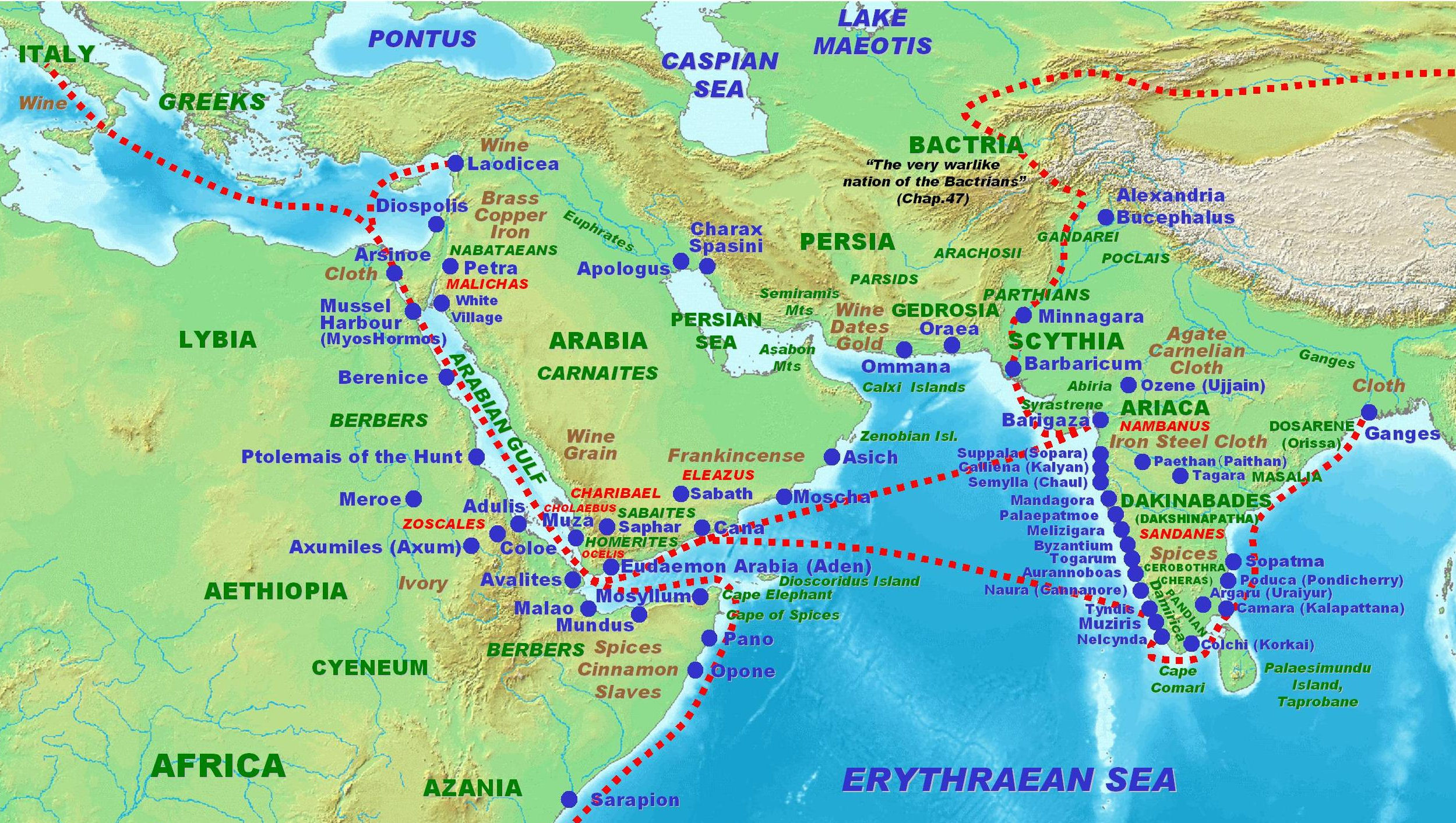
Roman trade with ancient Coastal India according to the Periplus Maris Erythraei 1st century CE.

Coastal India is a geo-cultural region in the Indian subcontinent that spans the entire coastline of India.

In 2024, the Indian total coastline was estimated to be 11,098.81 km. Earlier in 1970, the National Hydrographic Office and Survey of India had calculated the coastline to be 7,516 km; as per the then existing techniques and technologies of measurement. As per 2024 data, Gujarat has the longest coastline with 2,340 km. The 2nd longest coastline belongs to Tamil Nadu with 1,068 km; followed by Andhra Pradesh with 1,053 km and West Bengal with 721 km.

== Geography ==
Coastal India, lies with in Coastal South Asia and which in turn lies within Indo-Pacific. Coastal India is the coastal area of South India (also known as Peninsular India), and non-coastal area of South India is known as the Deccan Plateau. Coastal India's southern coast is bound by Laccadive Sea to the south and Deccan plateau to its north.

=== Regions ===
Coastal India consists of a variety of geographically distinct regions. It includes Indian states on the Indian Subcontinent that border the Indian Ocean, the Lakshadweep islands, as well as the Andaman and Nicobar Islands.

Eastern Coastal India is bounded by the Eastern Ghats along its midsection and the Bay of Bengal to the east. Coastal states of India on the eastern side of the subcontinent are West Bengal, Odisha, Andhra Pradesh, the Puducherry union territories, and Tamil Nadu. Eastern Coastal India borders Bangladesh and Sri Lanka.

Western Coastal India is bound by Arabian Sea to its west and the Western Ghats along its midsection. Coastal state of India on the west side are Kerala, Karnataka, Goa, Maharashtra, Gujarat, and the Dadra and Nagar Haveli and Daman and Diu union territories. Western Coastal India borders Pakistan.

Archipelagic India is made up of the Andaman and Nicobar Islands to the east of the subcontinent and the Lakshadweep Islands to the west. Both are union territories and due to their status as archipelagos are geographically distinct from other Indian states and territories. Archipelagic India has maritime borders with Indonesia, the Maldives, Myanmar, and Thailand.

=== Habitats ===
See also: Conservation in India

The Indian coastline is host to a variety of marine and coastal habitats ranging from both warm and cold water coral formations, seagrasses, saltmarshes, and mangrove forests.

Mangrove forests are major coastal habitats on the Indian Subcontinent, with India ranking third globally in terms of mangrove diversity and mangroves accounting for 26% of the Indian coastline, a total of 4,991 km. The majority of Indian mangroves can be found in West Bengal, which houses the Sundarbans National Park, the largest single area of mangroves in the world.

== Boundaries ==
See also: Borders of India

India has coastal land and maritime borders with Bangladesh, Indonesia, the Maldives, Myanmar (Burma), Pakistan, Sri Lanka, and Thailand

=== Disputes ===
See also: Territorial disputes of India

India's western maritime boundary with Pakistan is currently under dispute following a 2025 submission to the United Nations to extend its continental shelf. The submission is a revision of a 2009 proposal to extend the continental shelf in both the Arabian Sea and the Bay of Bengal. The Sir Creek, a tidal estuary along the western terminus of the India-Pakistan border is under dispute with competing claims by both parties as to where the border lies.

A maritime dispute with Bangladesh initiated in 2009 was settled by arbitration with the United Nations in 2014. The the case resulted in a grey area being established with Bangladesh controlling the seafloor and India controlling the Exclusive Economic Zone (EEZ) above.

India is currently in dispute with Sri Lanka, as both countries claim undersea mining rights over the Afanasy Nikitin Seamount.

== History ==
A thriving trade existed between the Mediterranean world and Coastal Indian regions This led to significant intermingling between the people of Coastal India and the west asian world, particularly along the South West Indian Coastline along the Arabian Sea. Several west Asian communities have also settled and become part of the diversity of coastal south west India. These include the Parsis, Bohras and Baghdadi Jews in the westernmost region, The descendants of west Asian and mediterranean traders like The Bearys of Kanara region and the Mappilas along Malabar region, and the cochin jews and Syriac Nasranis along the southernmost region of South India. The Chola Empire established vast Tamil influence across South East Asian region across Indonesia, Java, Bali, Sumatra, Malaysia and Singapore. This brought South Indian Heritage to Cambodia, Indonesia and Bali where the Balinese Hindu traditions still thrives. This also lead to intermingling between coastal India and the south east Asia particularly in the South eastern Cholamandalam coastline along the Bay of Bengal.

Maritime tarde routes from coastal India were responsible for the spread of Indian influence, thus creating the Greater India region which had sanskritised-Indosphere, especially in Southeast Asia, resulting in dissemination of Buddhism and Hinduism and Indianization of Southeast Asia. Today, Indian diaspora is world's largest diaspora.

== Culture ==
The linguistic diversity of Coastal India includes languages of the Dravidian language family including Tamil, Telugu, Tulu, Malayalam, Beary and Kannada; languages belonging to the western zone of Indo Iranian language families including Gujarati, Marathi, Konkani, languages belonging to the central zone of the Indo-Iranian language families including Urdu and Persian and languages belonging to the eastern zone of Indo Iranian language family including Odia and Bengali. The region also has speakers of Semitic languages like Arabic, Hebrew and Aramaic. The common elements of the people of coastal India includes cuisine that consists of agrarian and coastal products and clothing that involves long flowing drapes with bare midriff for both men and women suited for humid and warm climate. Throughout coastal India women wear drapes called saree in various styles. In the western corner of the region the drapes are called as Dhoti for men. and Chaniya choli for women, further southwards the drapes are called as lungi or mundu for men. and veshti for women. Towards the southernmost tip of coastal south western India the social system of inheritance was once matrilineal. There are various festivals celebrated in the coastal states centered on deities.

== Economy ==
=== Ancient trading routes ===
Coastal India and its Indian Ocean trade since ancient times has facilitated several trading routes:

- Indo-Mediterranean
  - India–Middle East–Europe Economic Corridor
  - Indo-Roman trade relations
  - Indus–Mesopotamia relations
- Maritime history of Odisha
- Silk Road

=== Modern shipping routes ===
- Westbound: India → Nine Degree Channel → Oman/Iran → Strait of Hormuz (Persian Gulf)
- Southwestbound: India → Socotra Gap → Red Sea/Suez Canal
- Eastbound: Middle East → Eight Degree Channel → Malacca Strait

== Channels ==
=== Bay of Bengal channels ===
See Channels in Bay of Bengal.

=== Laccadive Sea channels ===
See Channels in Laccadive Sea.

=== Arabian Sea channels ===
The Arabian Sea contains several significant shipping channels and straits that connect the Indian Ocean with the Persian Gulf and Red Sea:

Major channels and straits in the Arabian Sea
Channel/Strait	Location	Width (km)	Depth (m)	Connects	Notes
Strait of Hormuz	Between Iran and Oman	39–96	~100	Arabian Sea to Persian Gulf	Critical global oil chokepoint
Eight Degree Channel	South of Lakshadweep	~150	~500	Laccadive Sea to Arabian Sea	Major shipping route to Maldives
Nine Degree Channel	Through Lakshadweep	~200	~600	Main Arabian Sea to Laccadive Sea	Primary India-Middle East route
Socotra Gap	Between Somalia and Socotra	~300	3000+	Arabian Sea to Somali Basin	Deepwater passage
Indus Canyon	Off Pakistan coast	~100 (length)	~1800	Indus Delta to deep sea	Major submarine canyon
Oman Basin	Central Arabian Sea	N/A	~3690	Connects regional basins	Deepest part (~5800m in Owen Basin)

== Museum ==
- National Maritime Heritage Complex

== Gallery ==
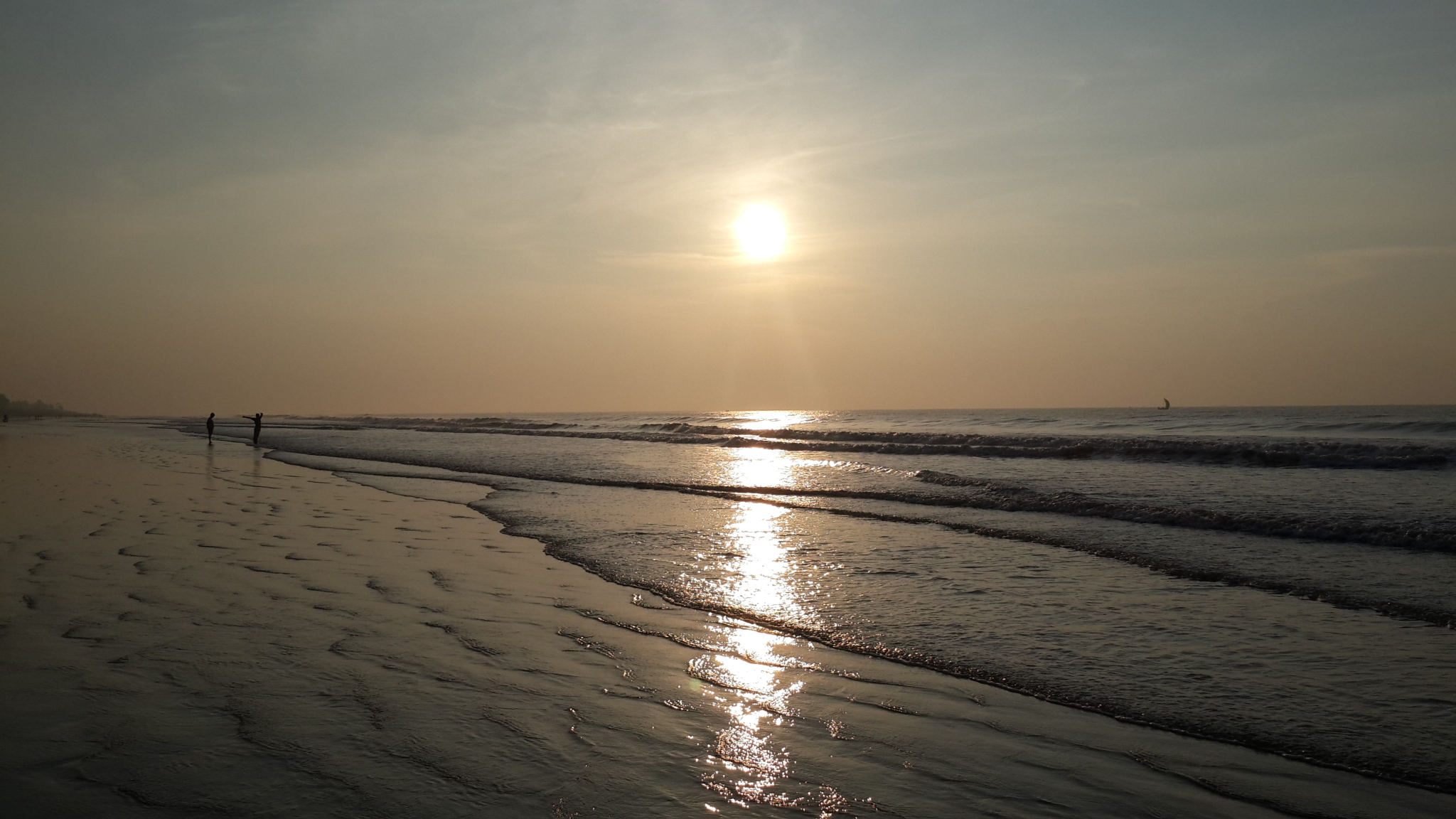
Sunrise at Digha Beach.

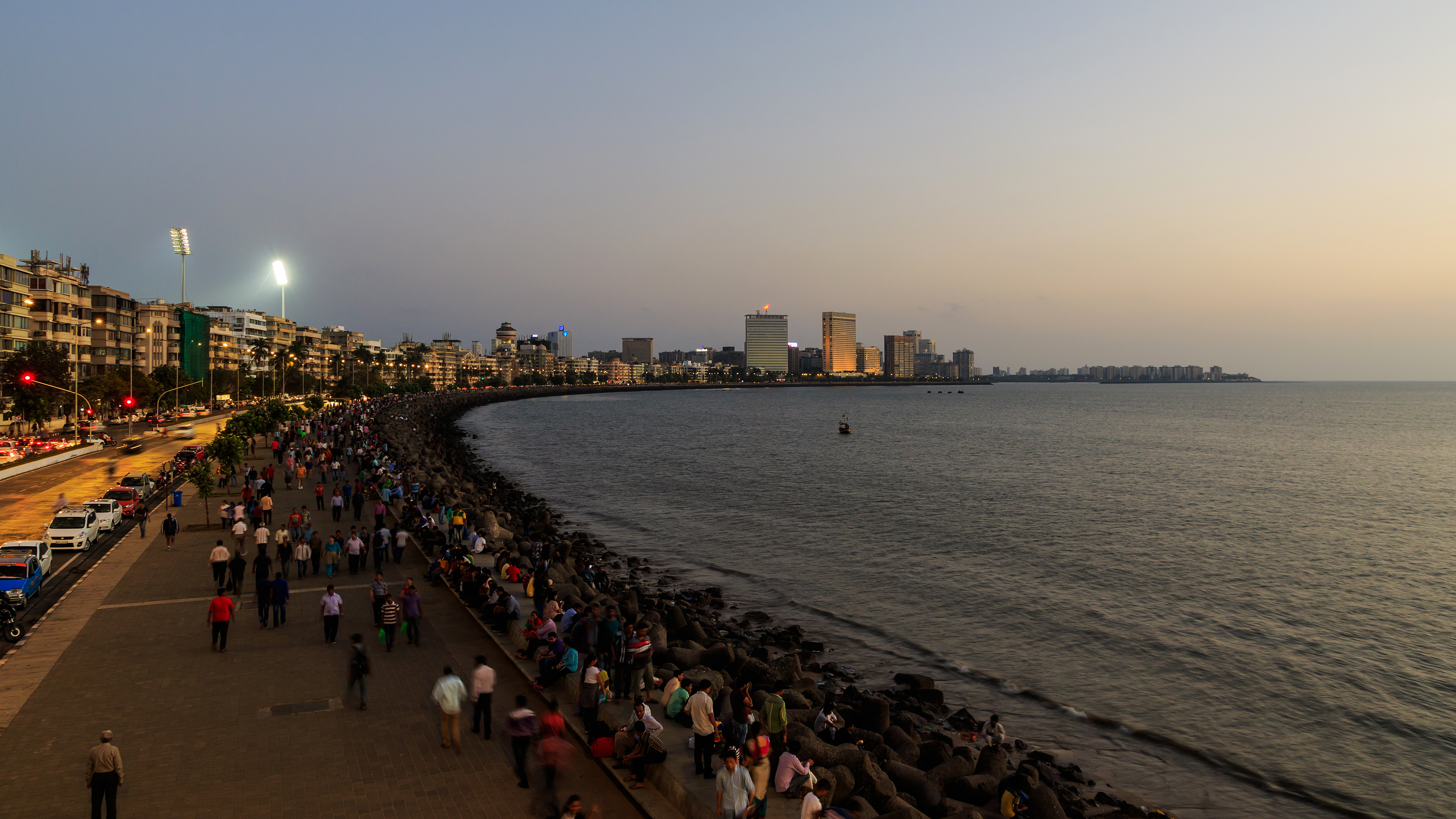
Girgaon Chowpatty and Marine Drive .

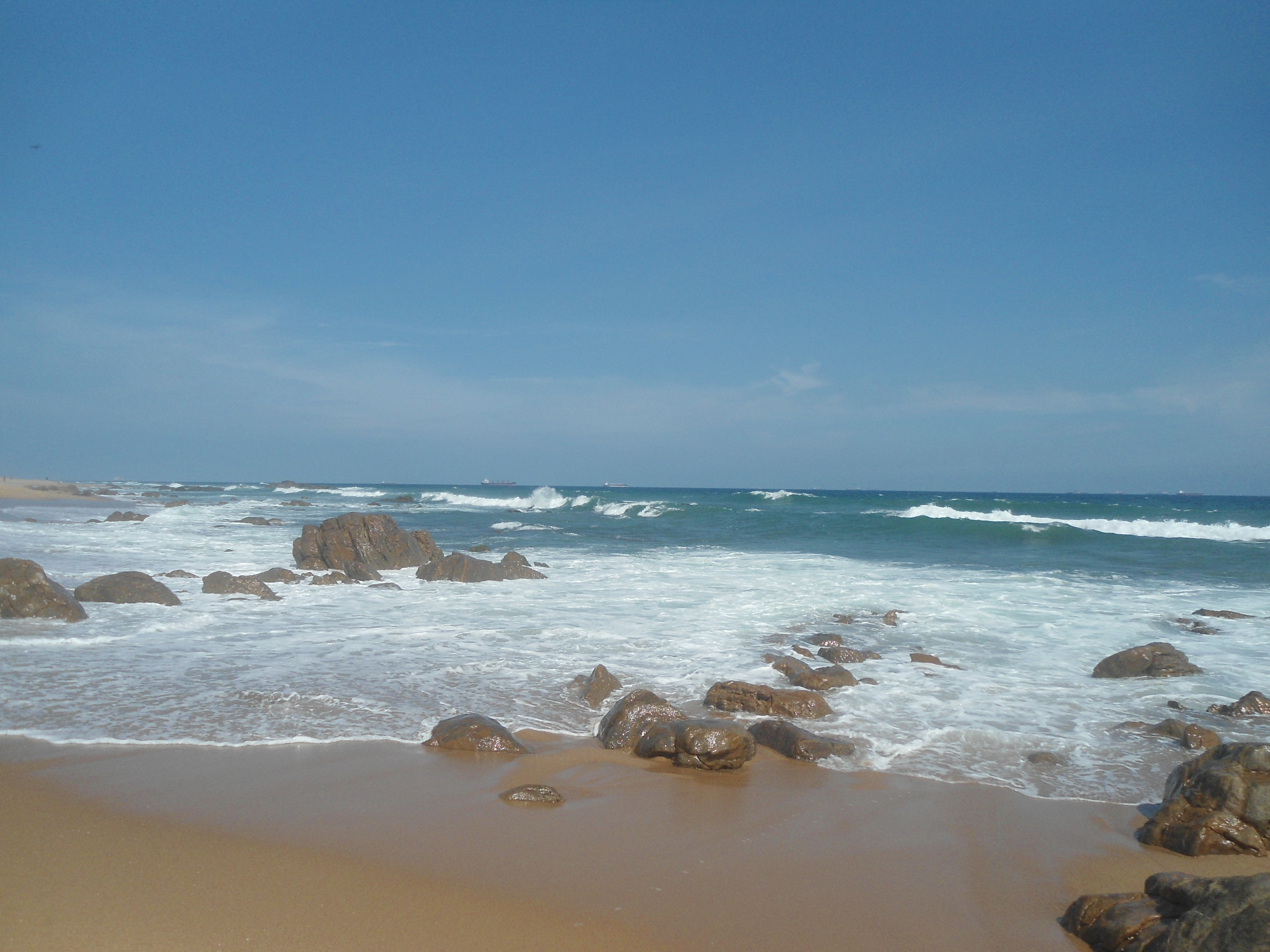
RK Beach in Visakhapatnam.

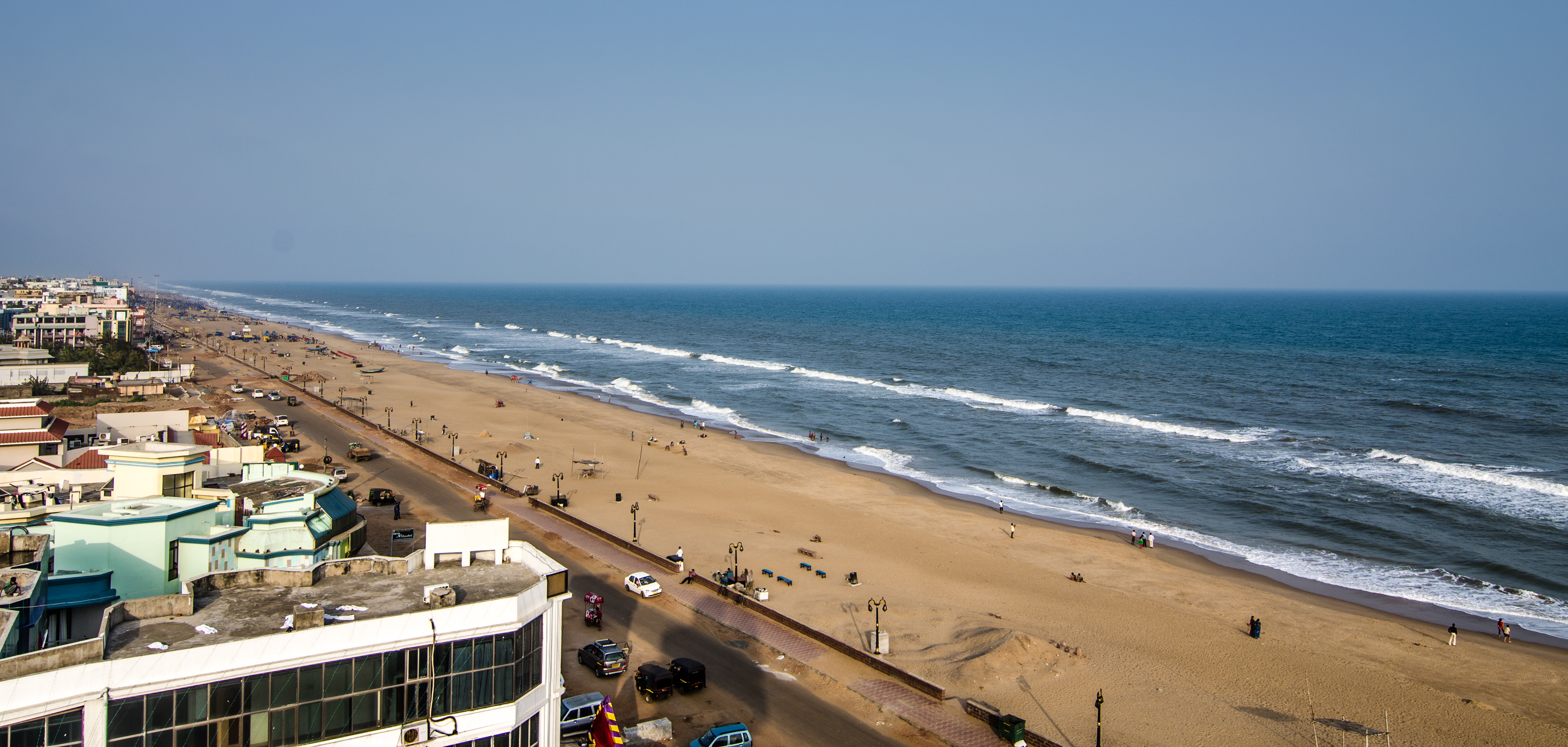
Puri Beach as it viewed from a light House.

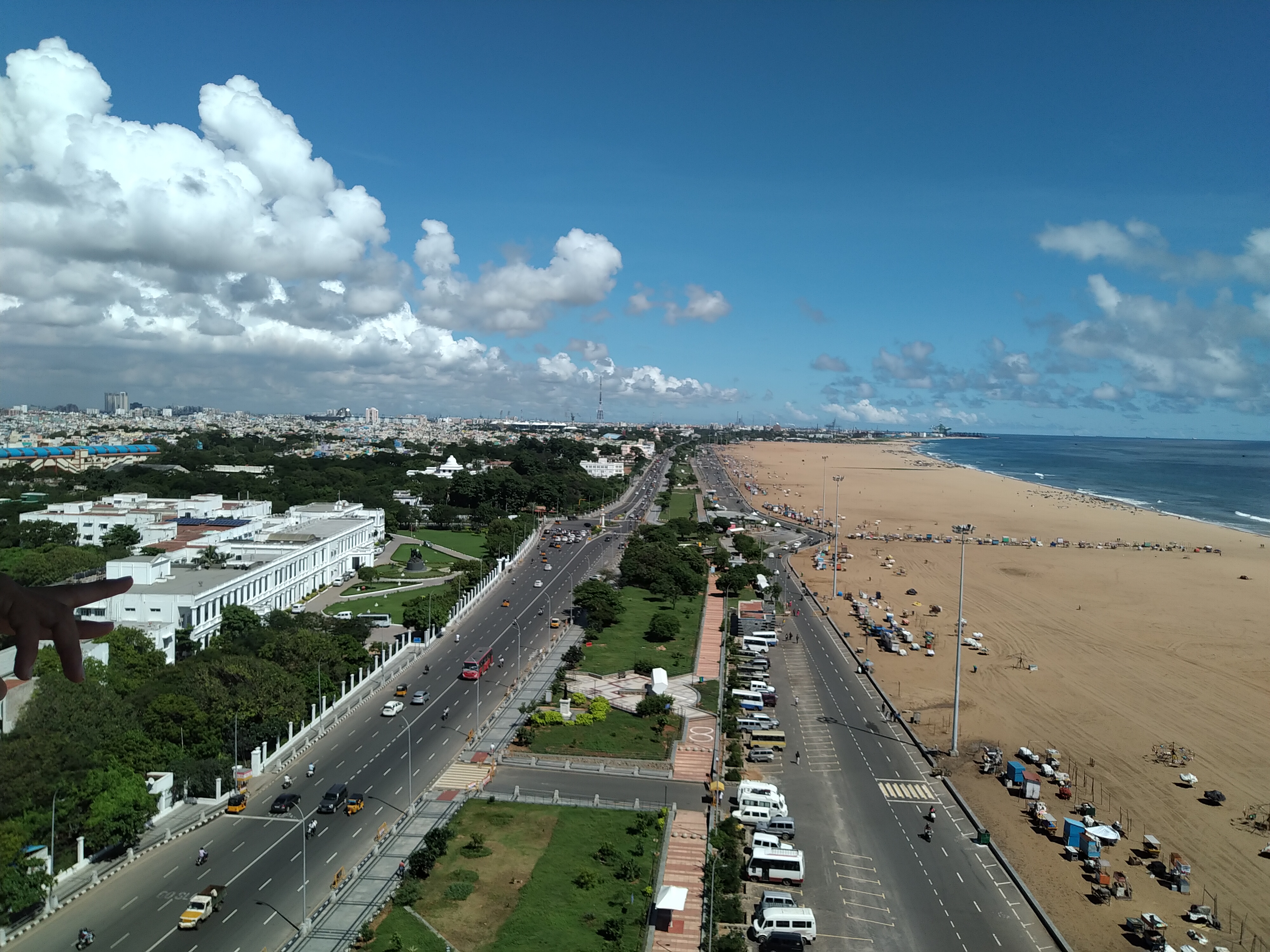
Marina Beach's Bird eye view.

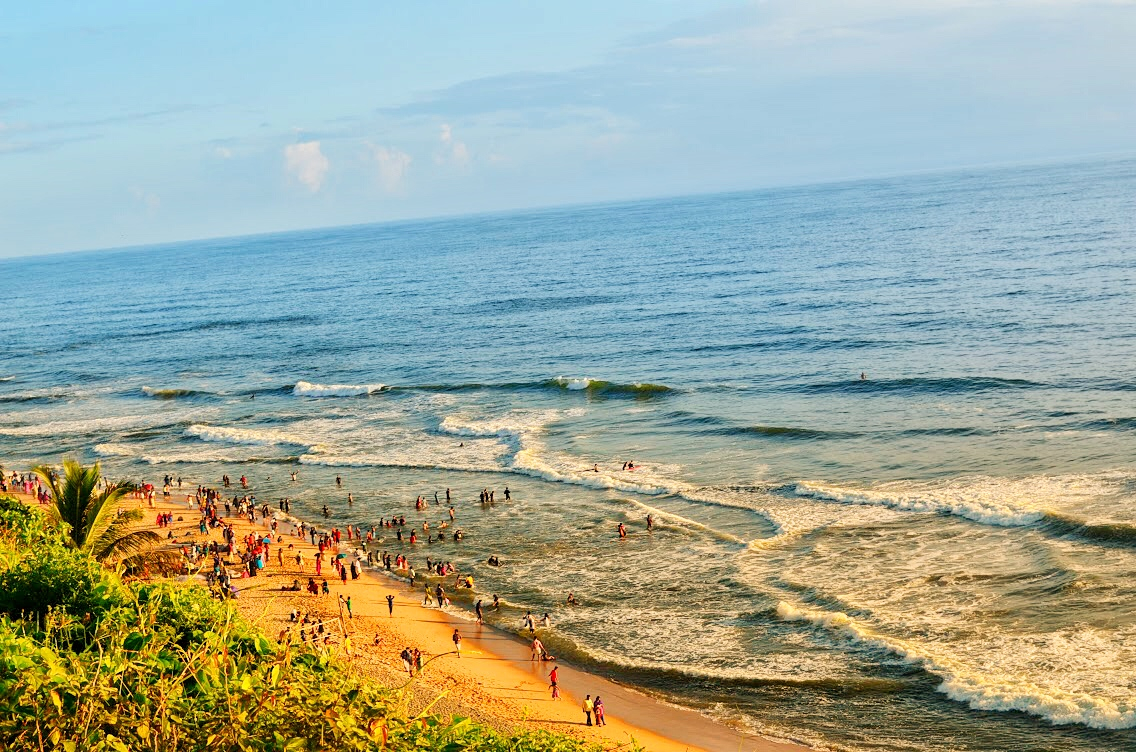
Varkala Beach, Kerala is the highest Cliff beach in India.

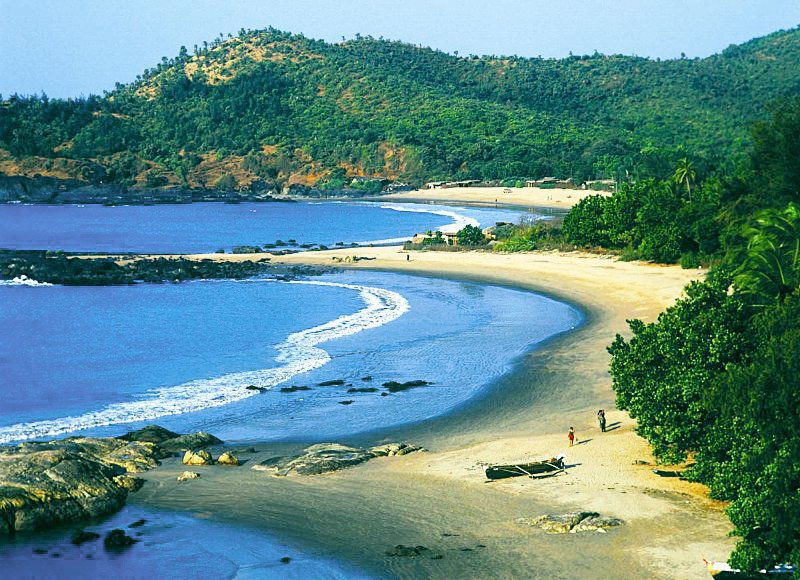
Om Beach is known as one of seven important centers of pilgrimage in Hinduism.

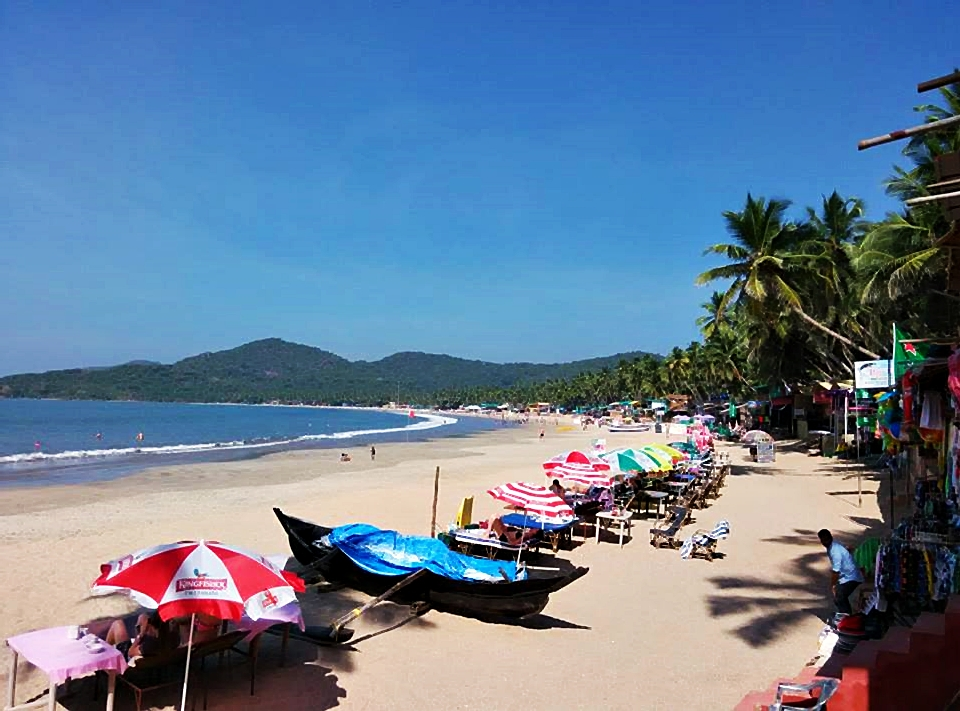
Palolem Beach is a tourist destination in South Goa.

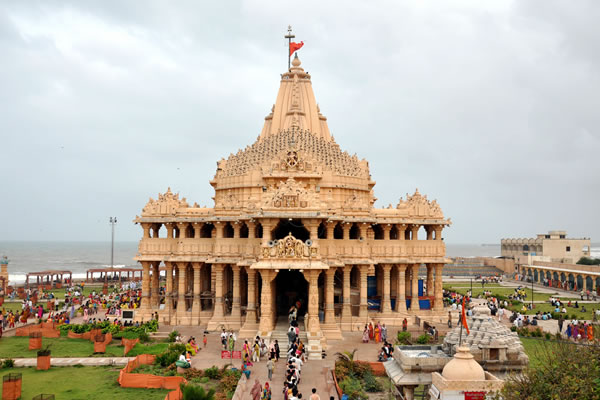
Somnath Temple with Veraval Beach in the background.

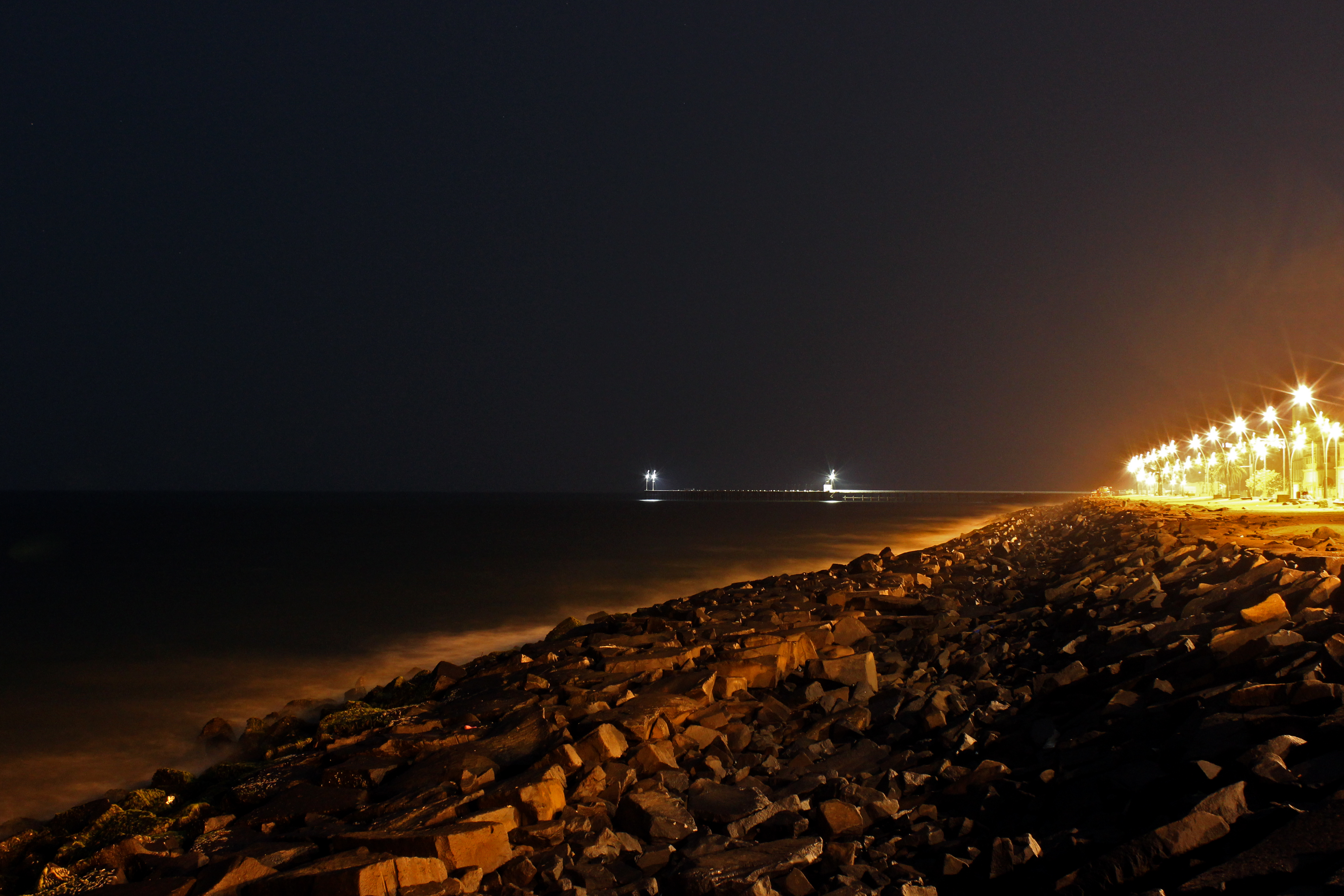
Promenade Beach at Night.

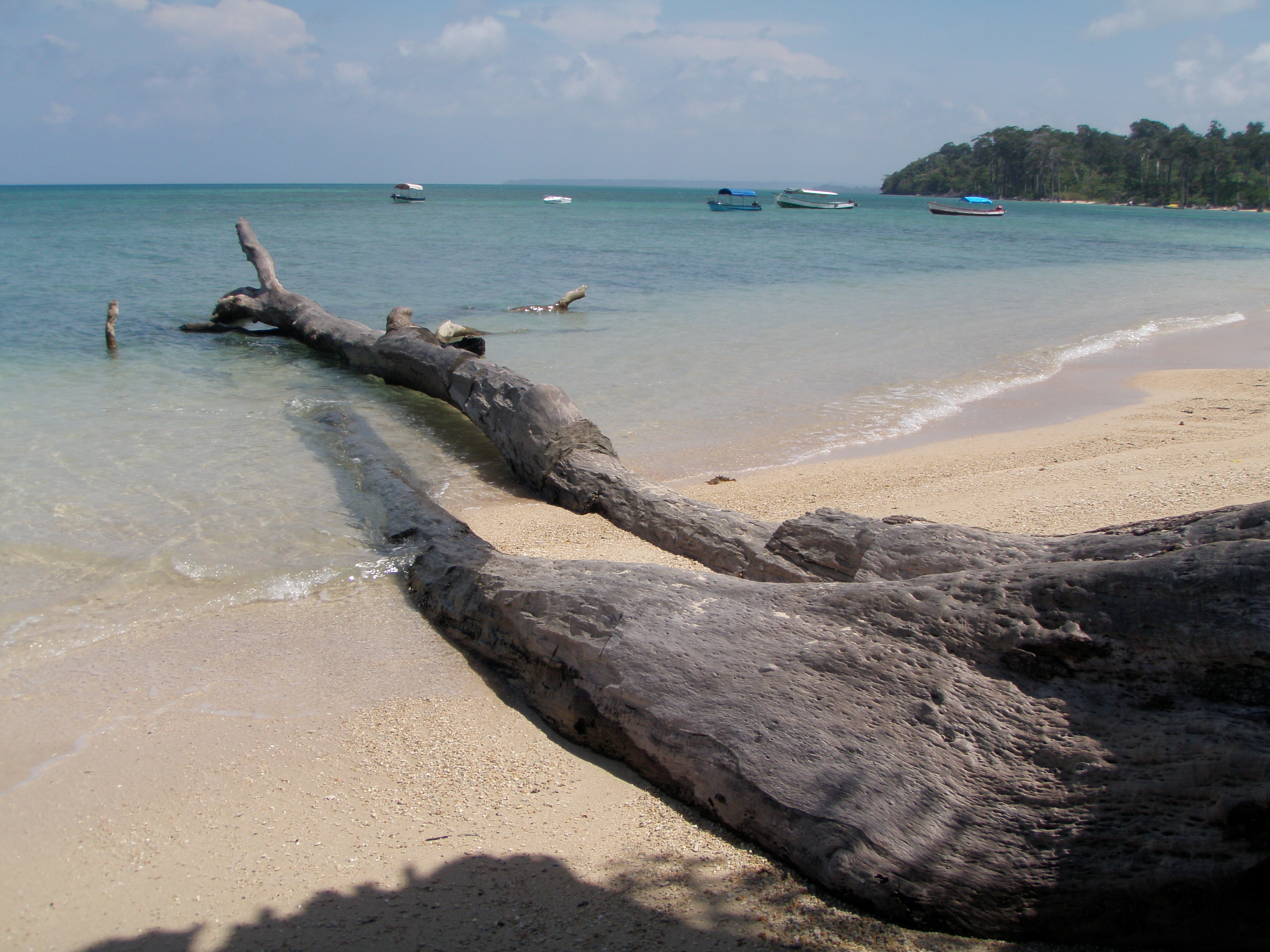
Wandoor Beach is an attraction of Mahatma Gandhi Marine National Park.

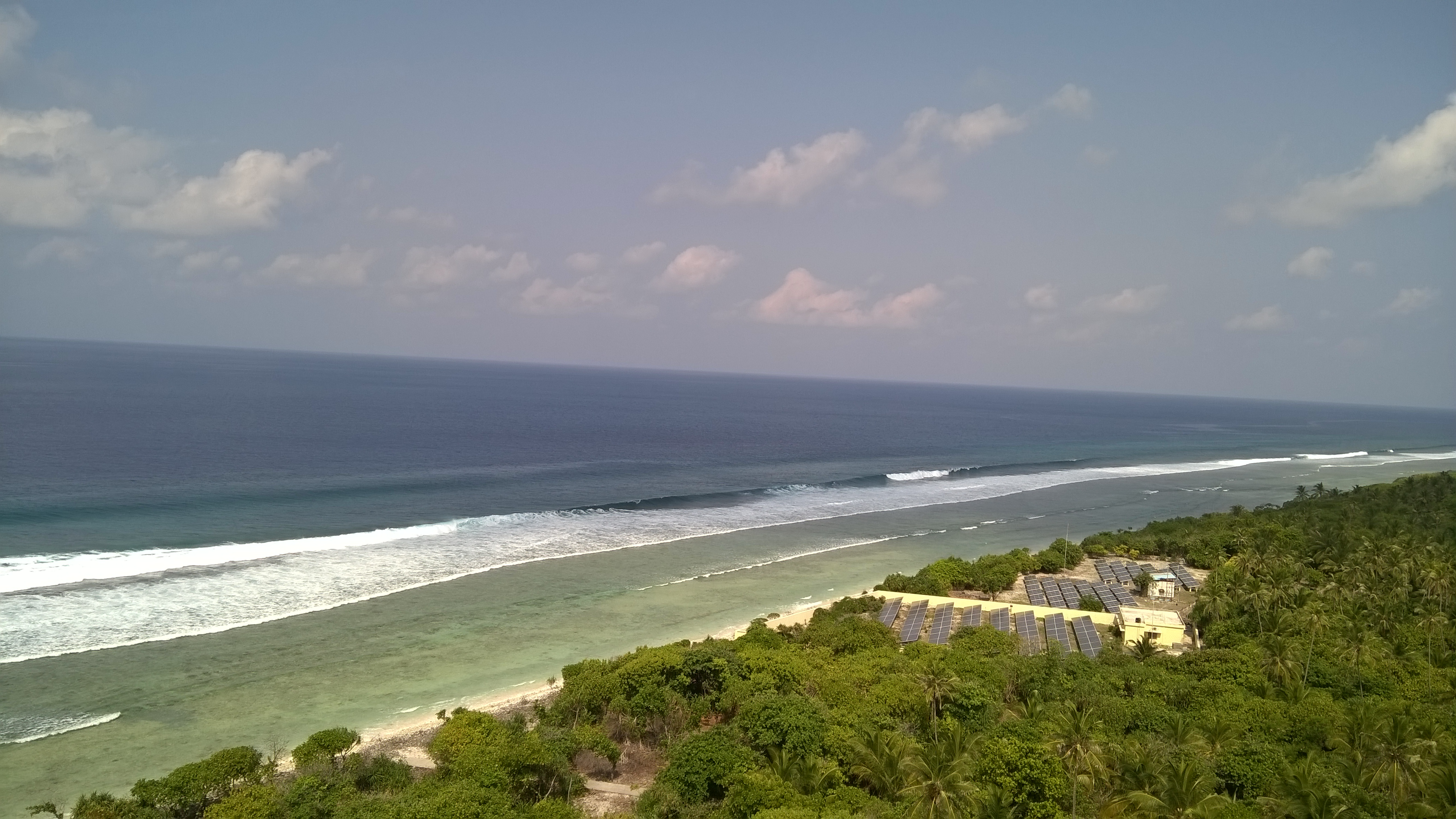
Minicoy is an island in Lakshadweep.

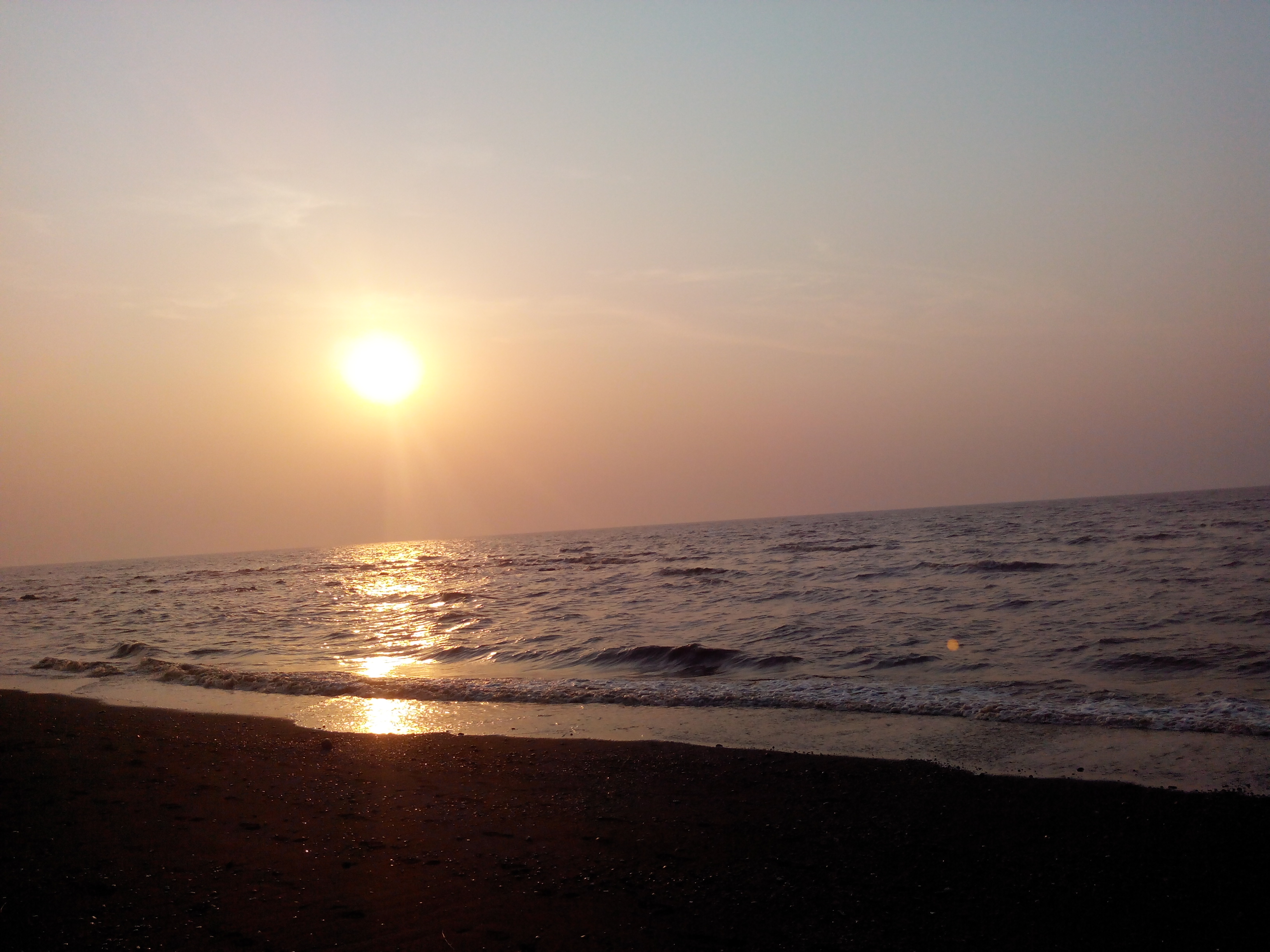
Sunset at Devka Beach, Daman.

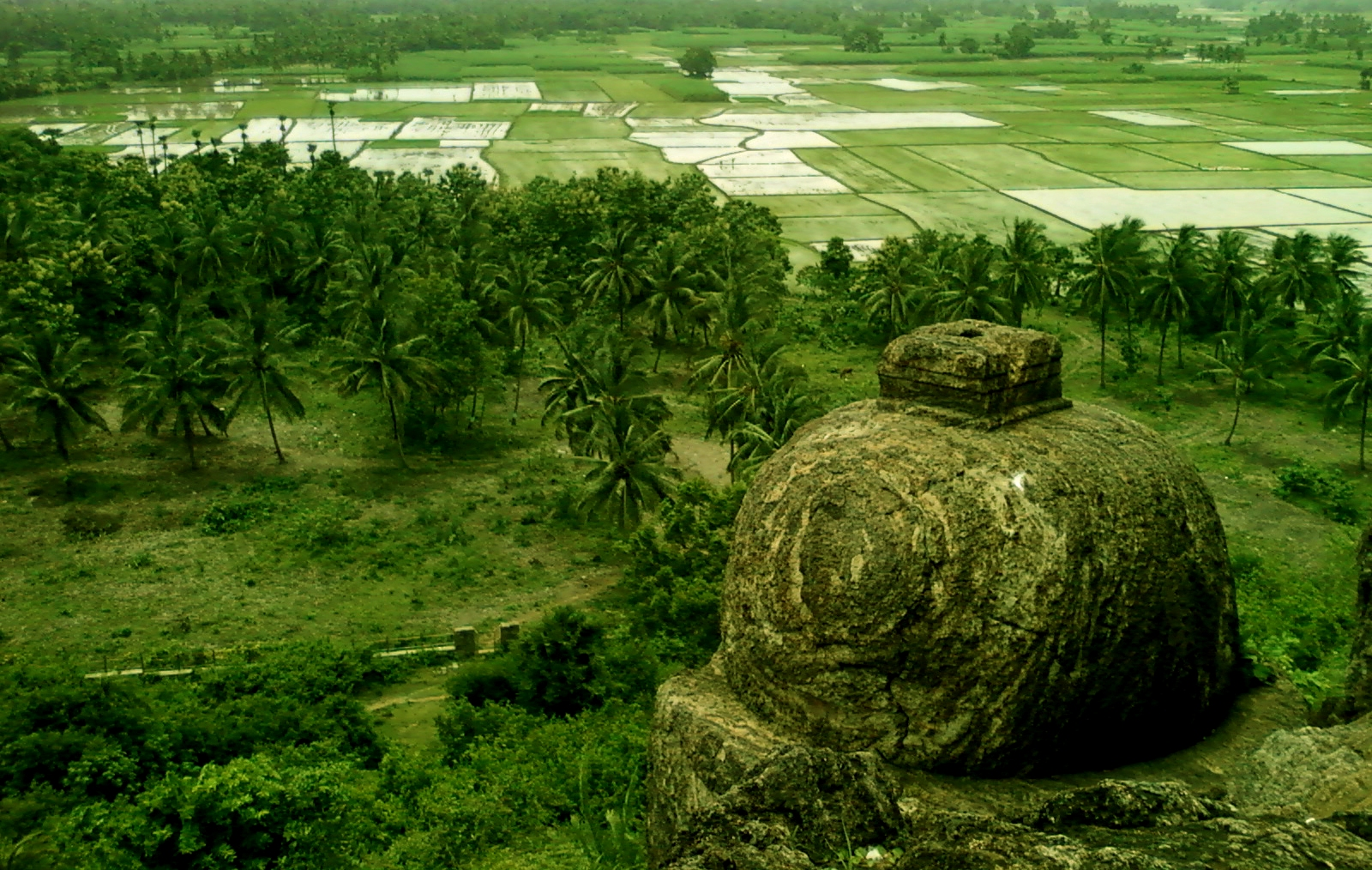
Scenic view of coastal plain fields near Visakhapatnam, Andhra Pradesh

== See also ==
- Borders of India
- Climate of India
- Exclusive economic zone of India
- Fishing in India
- Indian maritime history
- Outline of India
- Coastal South Asia
- List of islands of India
