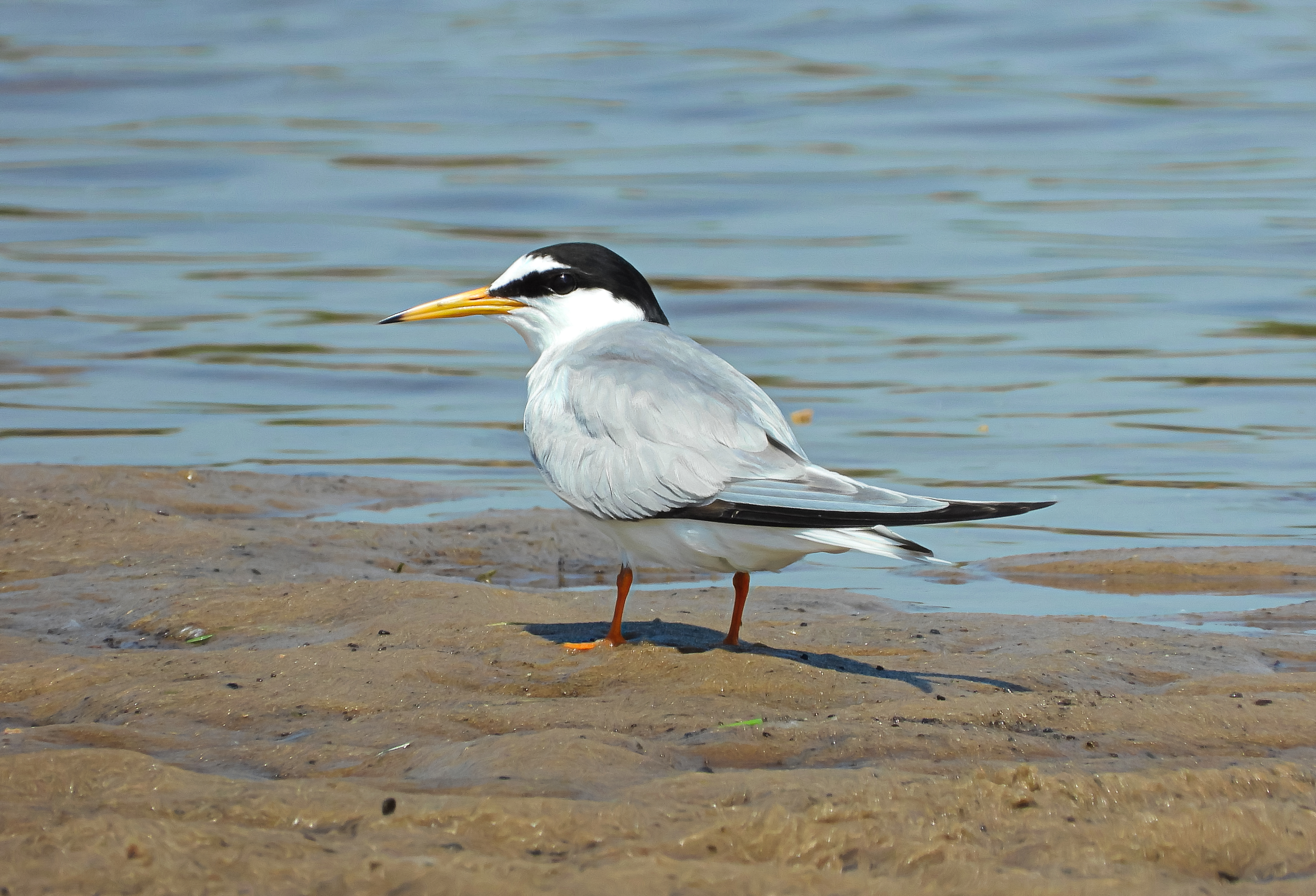
- Adult S. a. albifrons in breeding plumage, Lyubikovichi, Ukraine

Conservation status
- Least Concern (IUCN 3.1)

Scientific classification
- Kingdom: Animalia
- Phylum: Chordata
- Class: Aves
- Order: Charadriiformes
- Family: Laridae
- Genus: Sternula
- Species: S. albifrons

Binomial name
- Sternula albifrons (Pallas, 1764)
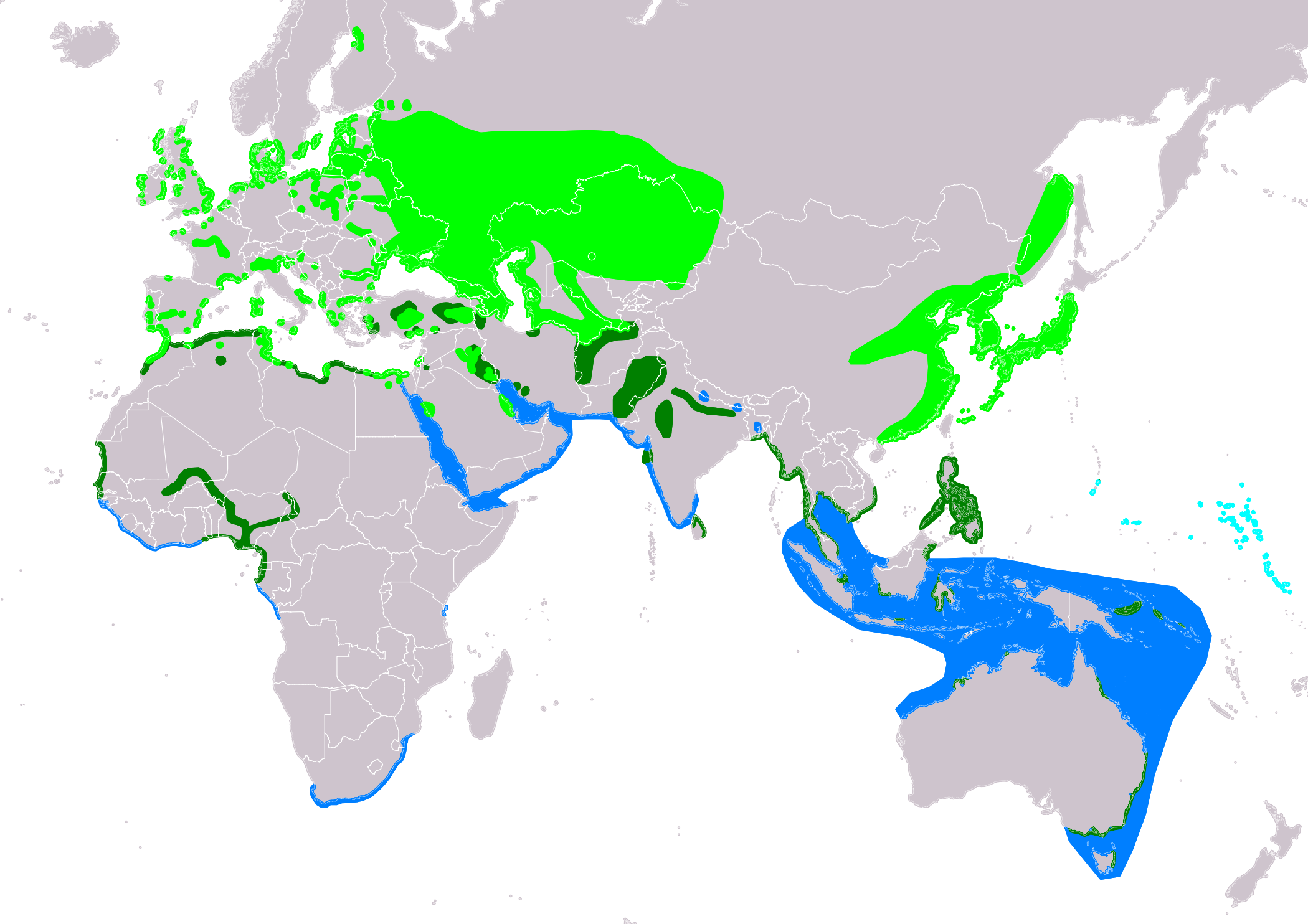
- Range of S. albifrons (compiled by BirdLife International and Handbook of the Birds of the World, 2019) Breeding Resident Passage Non-breeding

Synonyms
- Sterna albifrons (protonym); Sterna minuta Linnaeus, 1766

= Little tern =

Species of bird

The little tern (Sternula albifrons) is a small seabird of the family Laridae. It is widely distributed breeding on the coasts and inland waterways of Europe, Asia, north and west Africa, and eastern Australia. It winters in the subtropical and tropical oceans as far south as South Africa and Australia.

== Taxonomy ==
The little tern was formally described in a sales catalogue by the German naturalist Peter Simon Pallas in 1764 under the binomial name Sterna albifrons. The type locality is Holland in the Netherlands. The species was moved to the genus Sternula when the genus Sterna was restricted to the larger typical terns. The genus name Sternula is a diminutive of Sterna, 'tern', while the specific name albifrons is from Latin albus, 'white', and frons, 'forehead'.

Four subspecies are recognised:

- S. a. albifrons (Pallas, PS, 1764) – breeds Europe and northern Africa to central Asia; winters to African coast and to western India
- S. a. guineae (Bannerman, DA, 1931) – breeds coast and Niger River basin, Mauritania to Gabon, and northern Kenya
- S. a. placens Gould, J, 1871 – breeds coastal eastern Australia including Tasmania; ranges to Indonesia
- S. a. sinensis (Gmelin, JF, 1789) – resident river systems of Pakistan and northern India, Sri Lanka, and eastward to southeastern Asia, Philippines, and northern Australia, and disjunctly in southeastern Siberia, Japan, and Saipan (Micronesia) southward to southeastern China; winters Philippines, Malaysia, Indonesia, coastal New Guinea, Australia, New Zealand, and western Micronesia

The former North American subspecies (S. a. antillarum) and Red Sea subspecies S. a. saundersi are now considered to be separate species, the least tern (Sternula antillarum) and Saunders's tern (Sternula saundersi), respectively.

== Distribution ==
This bird breeds on the coasts and inland waterways of temperate and tropical Europe, Asia, north and west Africa, and eastern Australia. Some populations are migratory, wintering in the subtropical and tropical oceans as far south as South Africa and New Zealand.

== Description ==
This is a small tern, 21–25 cm long with a 41–47 cm wingspan. It is not likely to be confused with other species, apart from fairy tern and Saunders's tern, because of its size and white forehead in breeding plumage. Its thin sharp bill is yellow with a black tip and its legs are also yellow. In winter, the forehead is more extensively white, the bill is black and the legs duller.

== Habitat and behaviour ==
The little tern breeds in colonies on gravel or shingle coasts and islands. It lays two to four eggs on the ground. Like all white terns, it is defensive of its nest and young and will attack intruders.

Like most other white terns, the little tern feeds by plunge-diving for fish, either in coastal saline environments, or inland, along larger rivers. The offering of fish by the male to the female is part of the courtship display.

The call is a loud and distinctive creaking noise.

== Populations on European rivers ==
At the beginning of the 19th century the little tern was a common bird of European shores, rivers and wetlands, but in the 20th century populations of coastal areas decreased because of habitat loss, pollution and human disturbance.

The loss of inland populations has been even more severe, since due to dams, river regulation and sediment extraction it has lost most of its former habitats. The little tern population has declined or become extinct in many European countries, and former breeding places on large rivers like the Danube, Elbe and Rhine ceased. Nowadays, only a few river systems in Europe possess suitable habitats; the Loire/Allier in France, the Vistula/Odra in Poland, the Po/Ticino in Italy, the Daugava in Latvia, the Nemunas in Lithuania, the Sava in Croatia and the Drava in Hungary and Croatia. The status of the little tern on the rivers Tagus and lower Danube is uncertain.

The Drava population is one of the most threatened. Old-fashioned water management practices, including river regulation and sediment extraction, endanger the remaining pairs. Only 15 pairs still breed on extensive sand or gravel banks along the border between Hungary and Croatia. The WWF and its partners are involved in working for the protection of this bird and this unique European river ecosystem. The little tern is one of the species to which the Agreement on the Conservation of African-Eurasian Migratory Waterbirds (AEWA) applies.

== Gallery ==
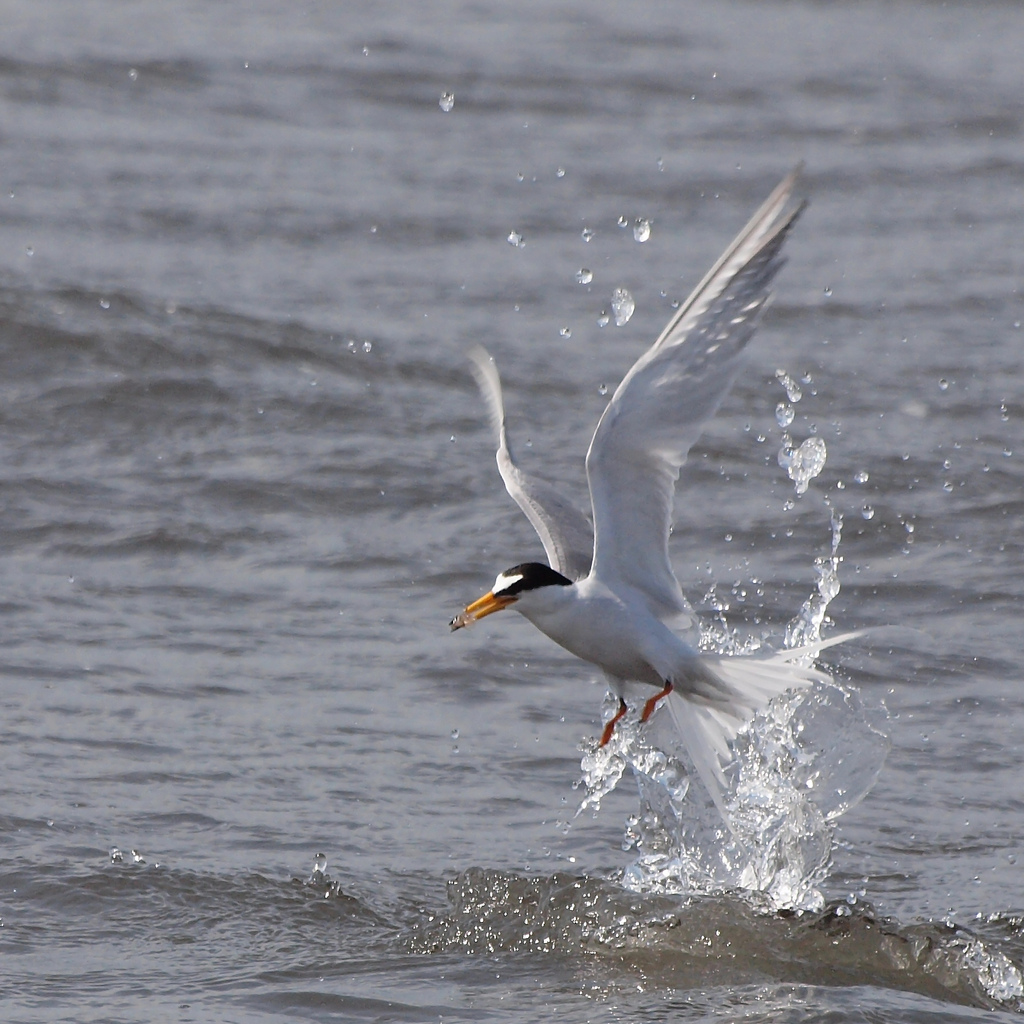
S. a. sinensis in flight, Tokyo Bay, Japan

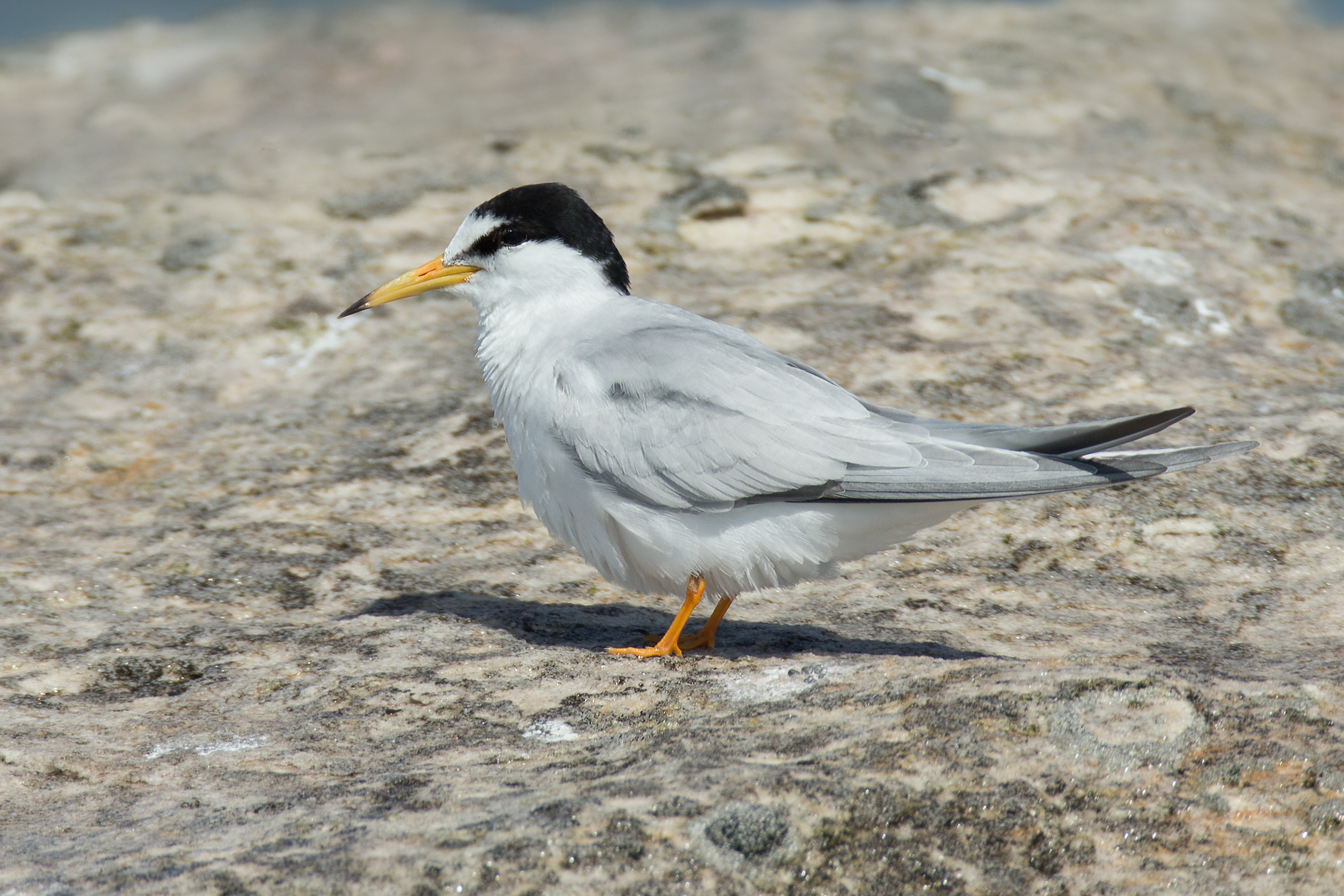
S. a. placens, Boat Harbour, New South Wales, Australia

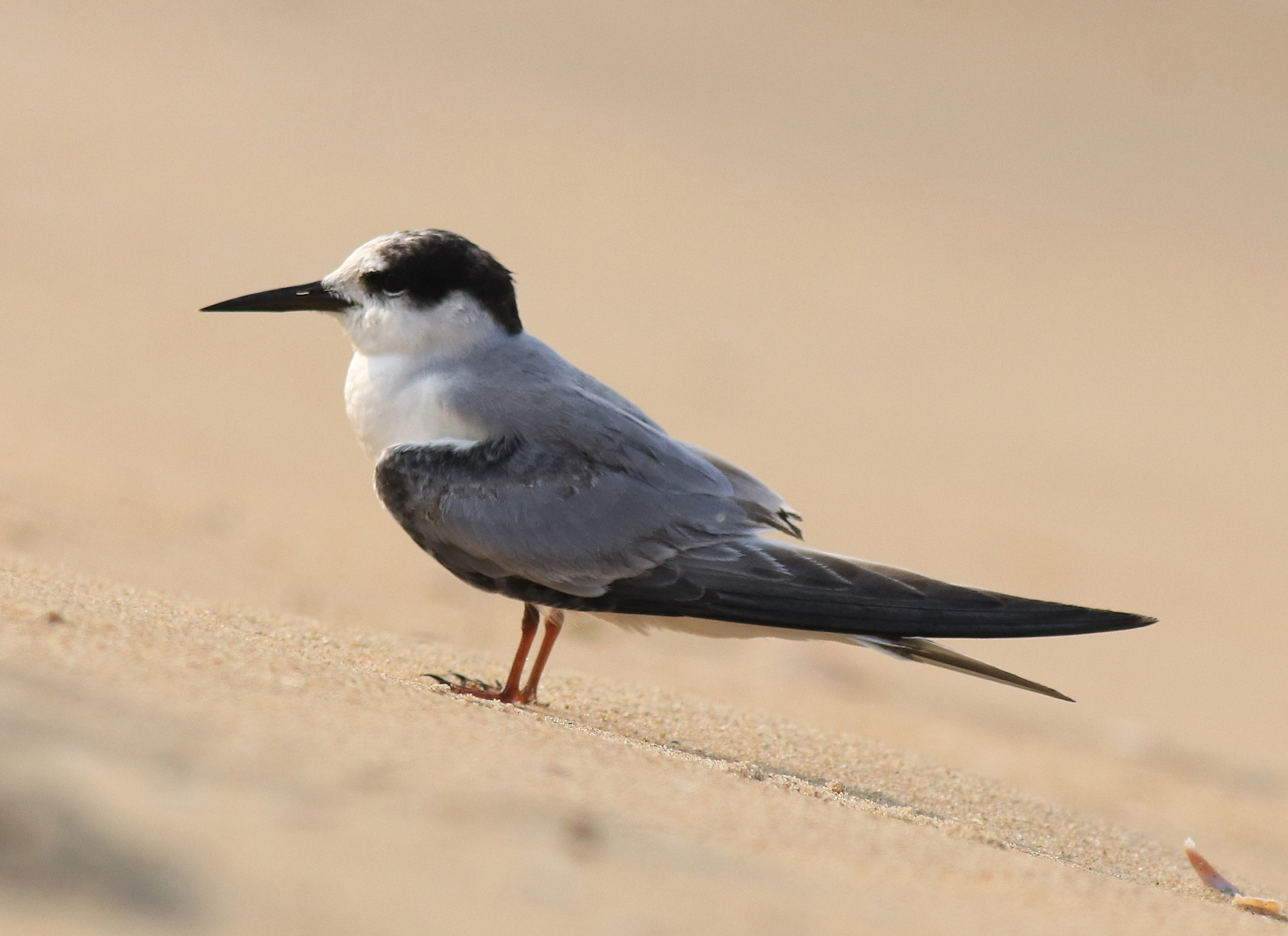
S. a. albifrons in winter plumage, Kannur, Kerala, India

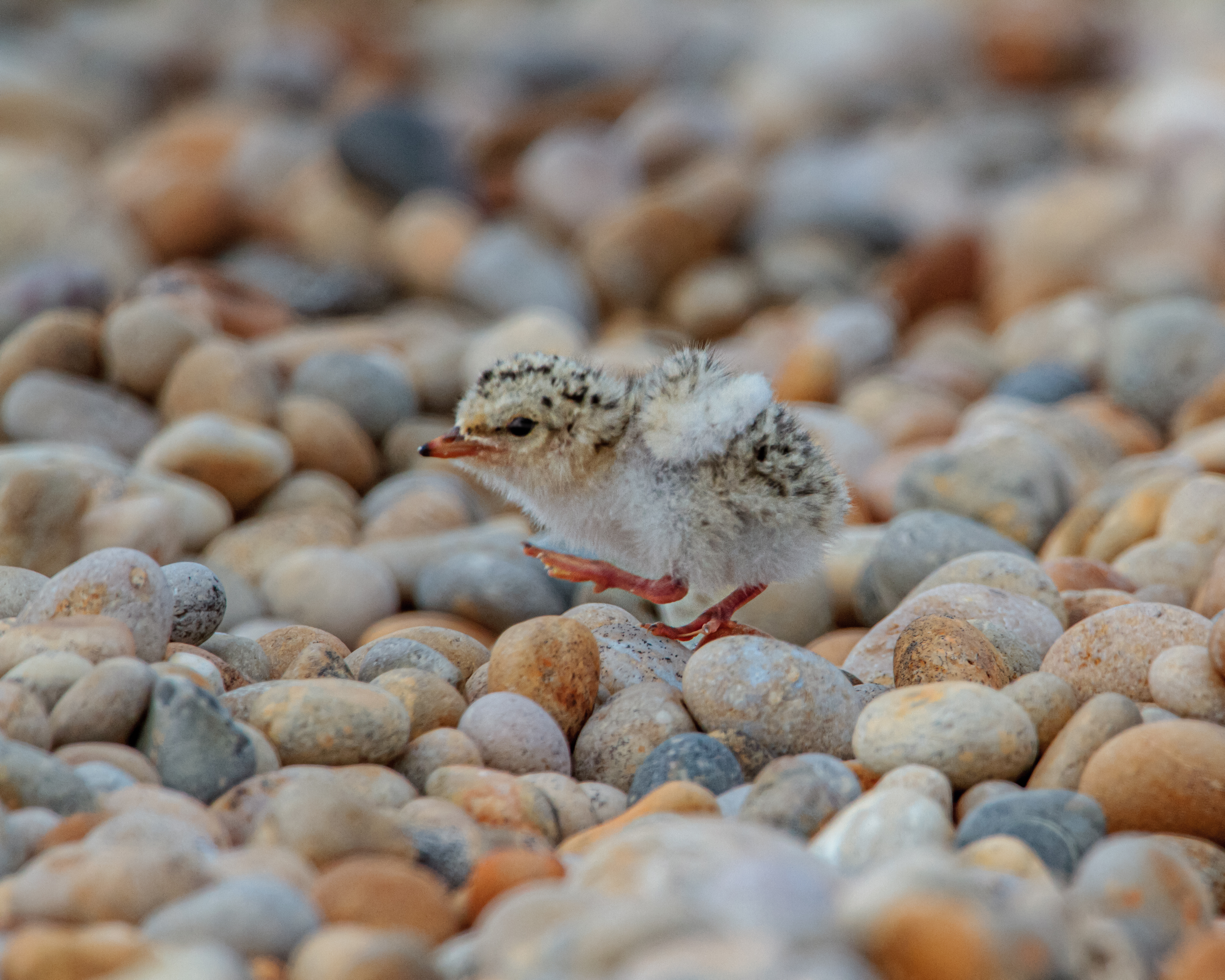
S. a. albifrons, recently hatched chick, Hampshire, UK

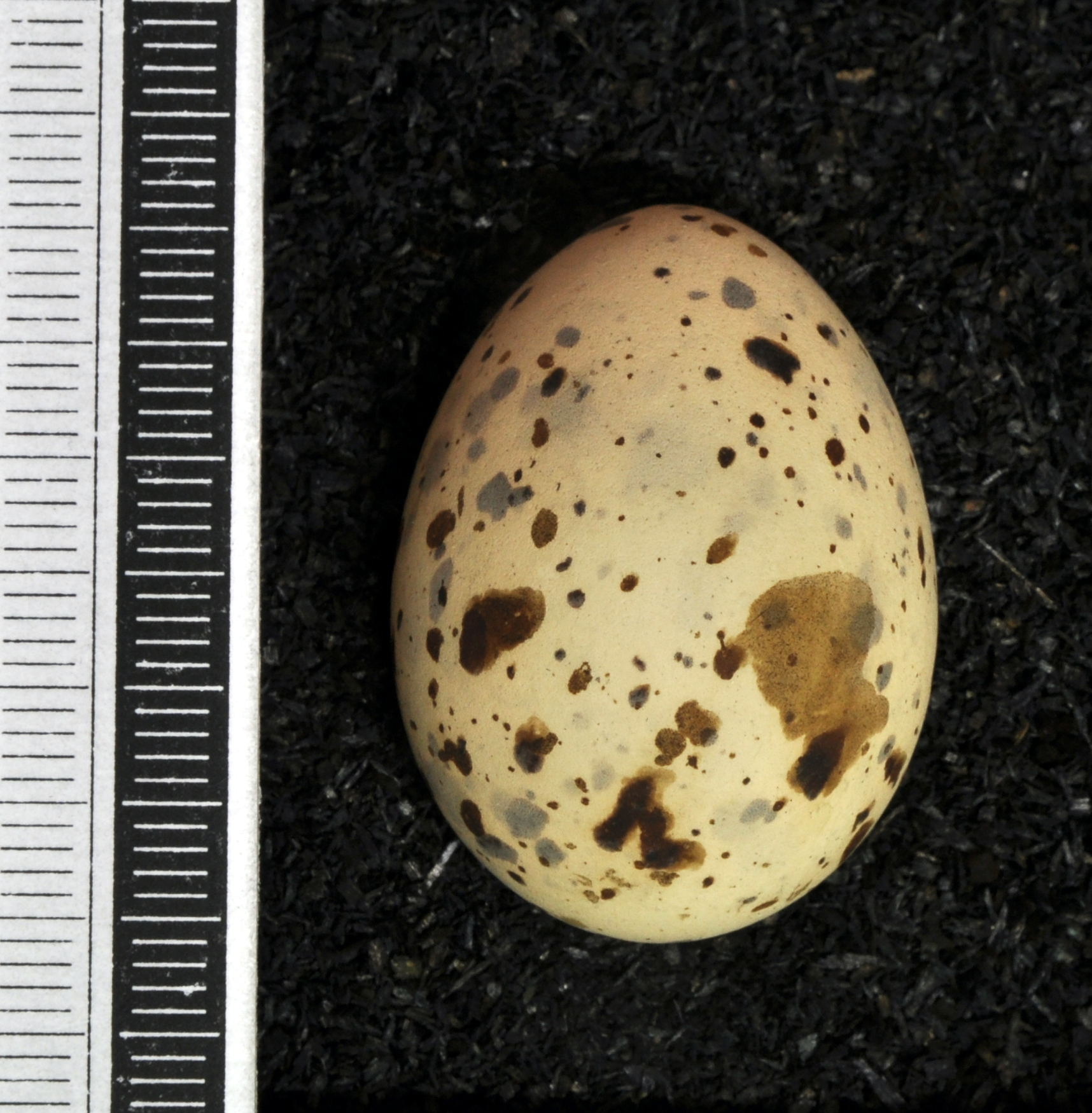
Egg, Collection Museum Wiesbaden

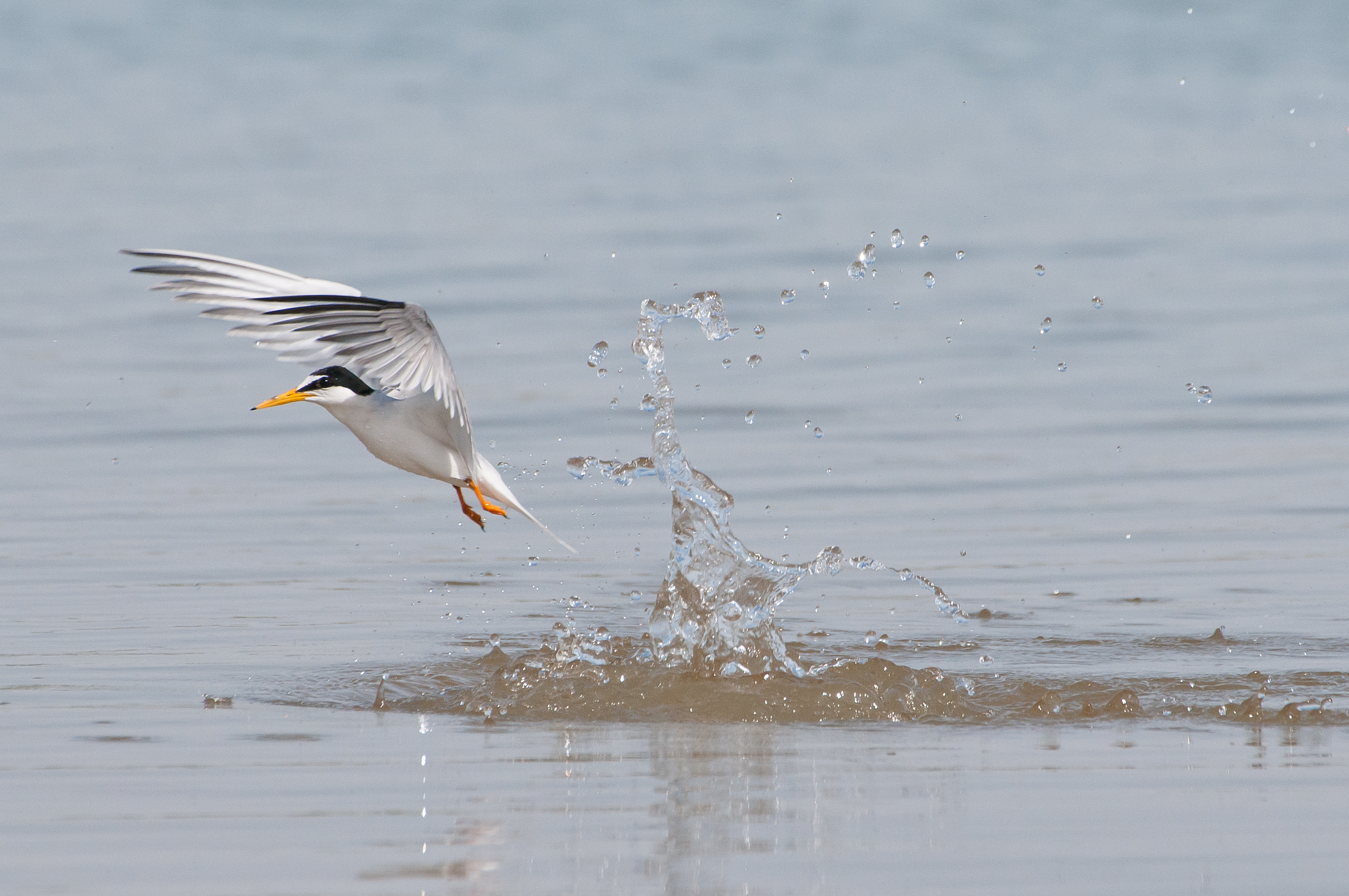
Hunting of the little tern in the Bukhara Region of Uzbekistan
