= Southern South Asia =

Geographical region of Asia

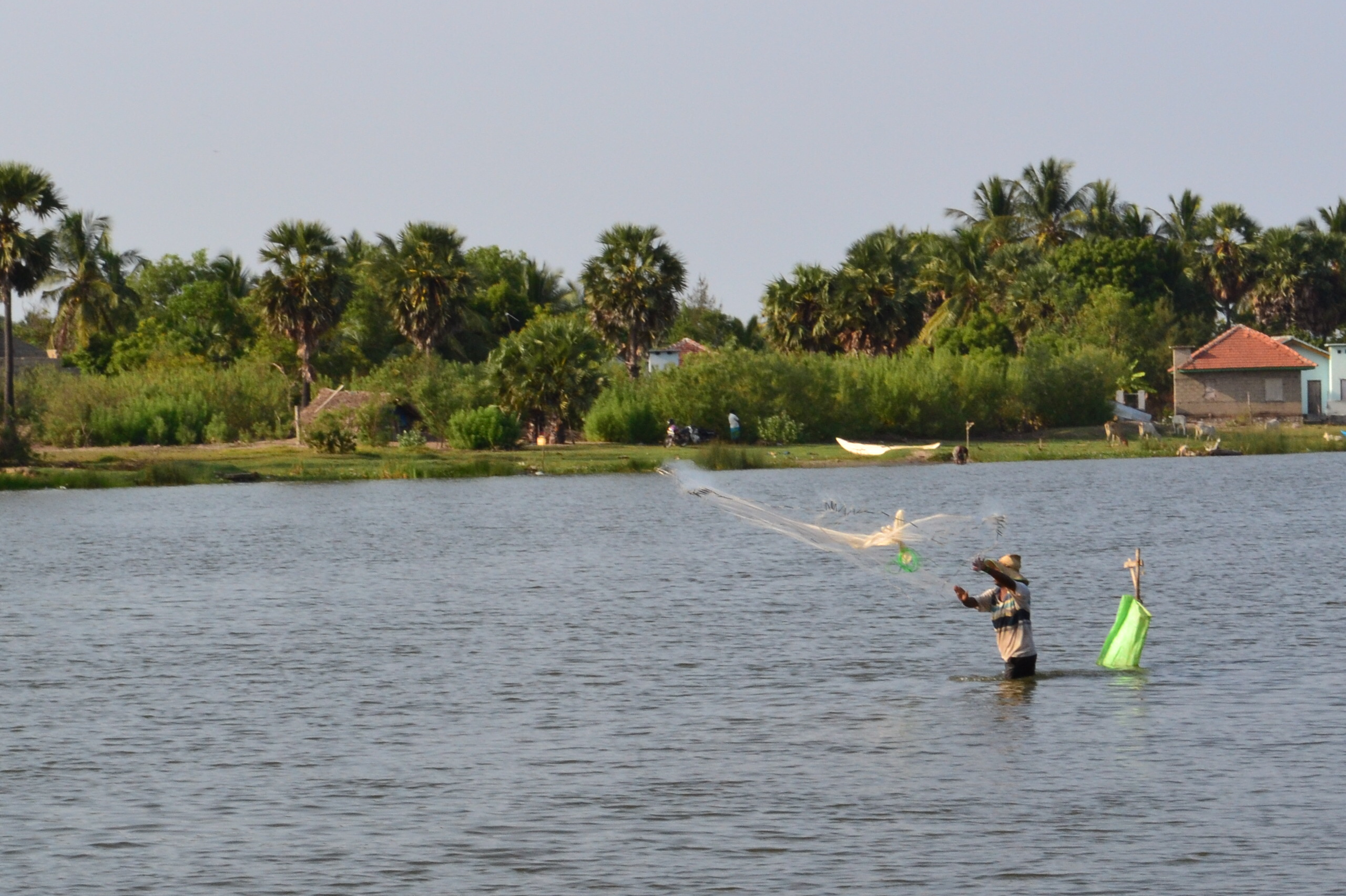
- Fishing activities in Sri Lanka.
- Demonym: Southern South Asian
- Countries: India (South India); Maldives; Sri Lanka
- Languages: Most common first languages: Kannada; Malayalam; Sinhala; Tamil; Telugu
- Time zones: UTC+5:30; UTC+5:45; UTC+06:00
- Internet TLD: .in
- Calling code: Zone 9
- Religions: Hinduism, Islam, Christianity, Buddhism, Irreligion, Tribal, Jainism
- Ethnic groups: Indo-Aryan, Dravidian

Southern South Asia is a geographical area in South Asia, and is the southern region of the subcontinent. Depending on definition, it includes the countries of India (particularly South India), the Maldives, and Sri Lanka. It is predominantly Dravidian.

Southern South Asia is noted for being the most culturally distinct region of South Asia from Northern South Asia, with greater gender equality. There is significant competition between India and China for influence over the island nations of the region.

== History ==
Southern South Asia was a hub of global trade in ancient times because of its position in the important Indian Ocean corridor. For example, a significant number of Roman products have been discovered in the region.

Governments throughout Southern South Asia adopted Sanskrit for public political expression beginning around 300 CE and ending around 1300, resulting in greater integration into the broader South Asian cultural sphere. This significantly influenced the languages of the region, making all of the major Dravidian languages except for Tamil highly Sanskritised.

Artisanal production of handicraft articles, metal-working (see Wootz steel) and cloth production were historically important features of the economy in Southern South Asia.

Tamil influence in the region is quite significant, with prominent empires such as the Chola dynasty taking Tamil culture to Sri Lanka and beyond South Asia, and Sri Lanka having an ancient Tamil minority and a Dravidian-influenced majority language of Sinhala. Chola innovations include various techniques for water resource management, some of which are used today to restore lakes throughout India. During British rule, Madras (now Chennai) became the center of the region, and a stability was created that benefitted Tamils throughout the region; Tamils were also favoured by the British in Sri Lanka over the Sinhalese people of the island. This laid the foundation for resentment and later ethnic conflict in Sri Lanka which lasted for decades.

== See also ==
- South India
  - Tamilakam
- Littoral South Asia
  - Southwestern Coastal South Asia
  - Southeastern Coastal South Asia
  - Island South Asia
