= Coastal South West India =

Geo-cultural region in the Indian subcontinent

Coastal South West India is a geo-cultural region in the Indian subcontinent that spans the western half of Coastal India. The region was referred as Sapta Konkan region in the Skanda Purana.

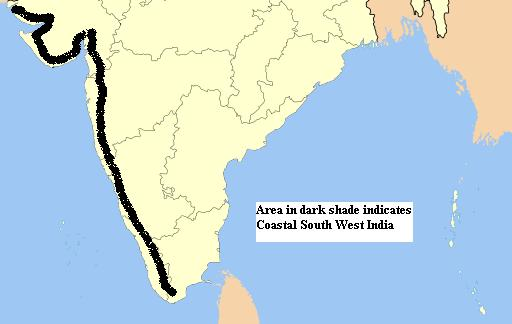
Coastal South West India

== Region ==
Coastal South West India spans across the entire Arabian Sea coastline of the Indian subcontinent from the coastline of the Gulf of Kutch in its westernmost corner and stretches across the Gulf of Khambhat, and through the Salsette Island and Mumbai along the Konkan and southwards across the Raigad region and through Kanara and further down through Mangaluru and along the Malabar unto the southernmost tip to Kanyakumari (Cape Comorin). In ancient tradition Coastal South West Indian subcontinent extends till Sri Lanka.

== People ==
The people along coastal south west India exhibit vast diversity along an underlying commonality as a result of long history of contact with west Asian Mediterranean traders along the Arabian sea coastline.

The region includes Gujaratis in the westernmost region, Maharashtrians and Goans along the western coastline, Kannadigas in its south western coastline and Tuluvas and Malayalis in its southernmost region of South India.

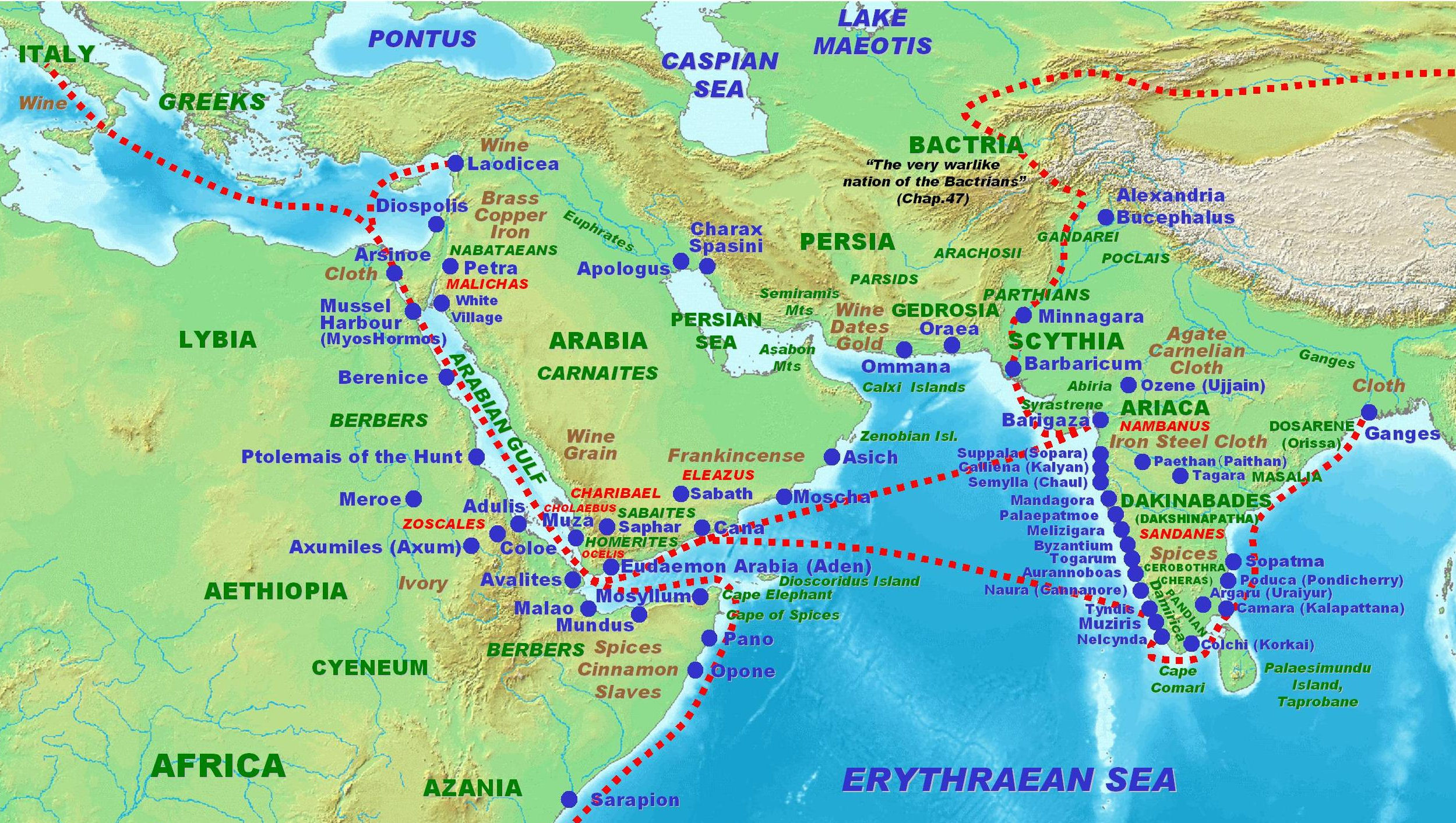
Roman trade with ancient Coastal South West India according to the Periplus Maris Erythraei 1st century CE.

=== Intermingling with the West Asian world ===
As a result of the thriving trade between the Mediterranean world and South West Indian coastline along the Arabian sea, there has been significant intermingling between the people of Coastal South West India and the West Asian world. Several west Asian communities have also settled and become part of the diversity of coastal south west India. These include the Parsis, Bohras and Baghdadi Jews in the westernmost region, the Bene Israel along the South western region the descendants of mediterranean traders along Coorg and Mangalore, the Jonakan Mappilas along Malabar region, and the cochin jews and Syriac Nasranis along the southernmost region of South India.

=== Heritage ===
The linguistic diversity of the Coastal south west India includes Languages of the Dravidian language family including Malayalam, Tulu, and Kannada; languages belonging to the western zone of Indo-Iranian language families including Gujarati, Marathi, Konkani and languages belonging to the central zone of the Indo-Iranian language families including Urdu and Persian. The region also has speakers of Semitic languages like Arabic, Hebrew and Aramaic. The common elements of the people of coastal south west India includes cuisine that consists of agrarian and coastal products and clothing that involves long flowing drapes with bare midriff for both men and women suited for humid and warm climate. Throughout the region women wear drapes called saree in various styles. In the western corner of the region the drapes are called as Dhoti for men and Chaniya choli for women. Further southwards the drapes are called as lungi or mundu for men, and veshti for women. Another common cultural element of coastal south west India includes relatively more role for women in social system. Towards the southernmost tip of coastal south western India the social system is considerably more matri-focal with instances of matrilineal and matriarchal tradition like amongst the Bunt community of Tulus and the Marumakkathayam of the Nairs and a section of Mappila Muslims. This is also manifested in feminine deity oriented festivals and rituals celebrating Shakti or feminine power like Navratri festival among the Gujarati people and Thiruvathira festival among the Malayali people.

== See also ==
- Southern South Asia
