= Sudarsan Pattnaik =

Indian Sand Artist

- ସୁଦର୍ଶନ ପଟ୍ଟନାୟକ
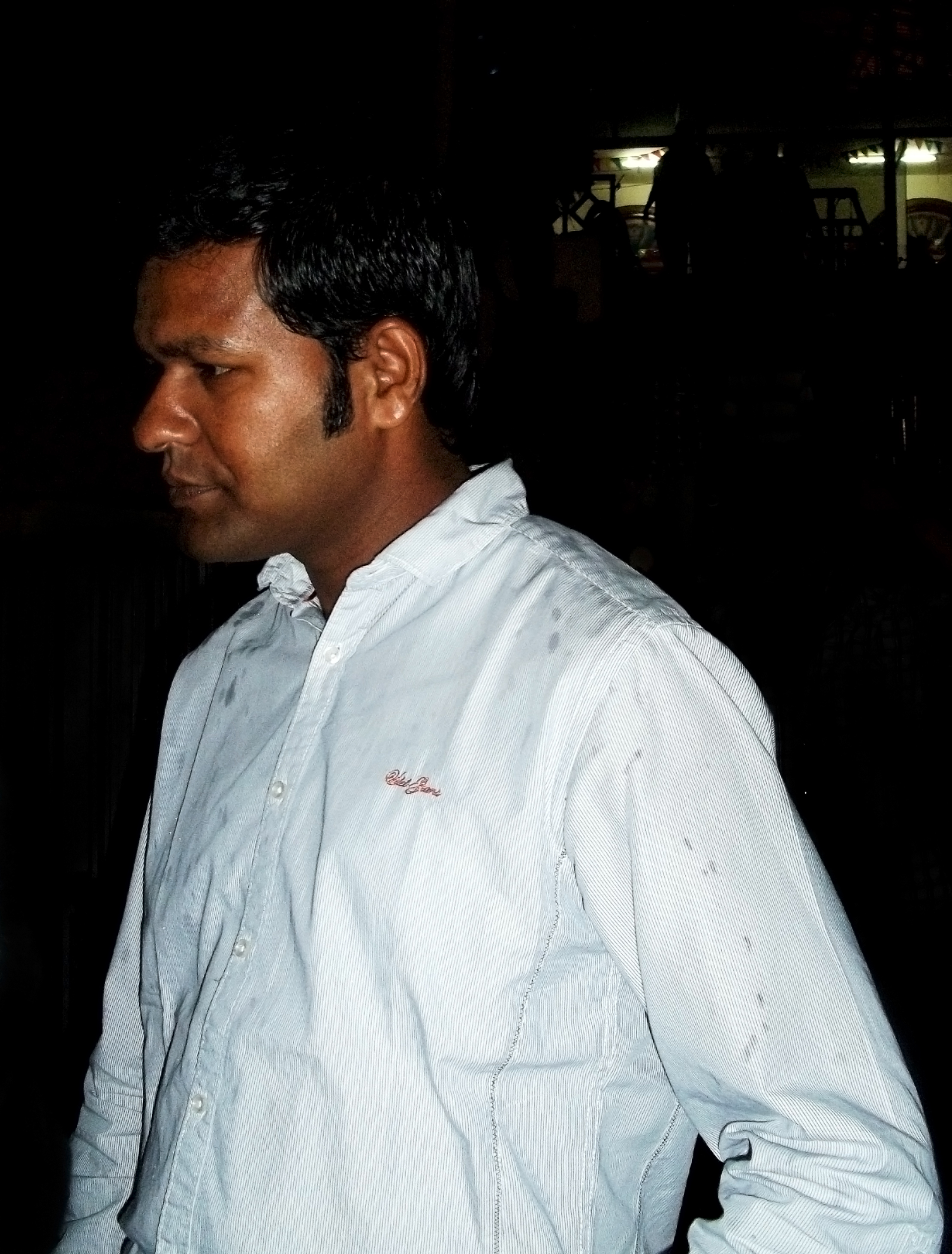
- Sudarshan Patnaik during Ganesh Chaturthi in Bengaluru
- Pronunciation: s̪ud̪ɔɾʃɔn̪ɔ pɔʈːɔn̪ɑjɔkɔ
- Born: 15 April 1977 (age 49); Puri, Odisha, India
- Occupation: Sand artist
- Awards: Padma Shri (2014)
- Website: www.sudarsansand.art

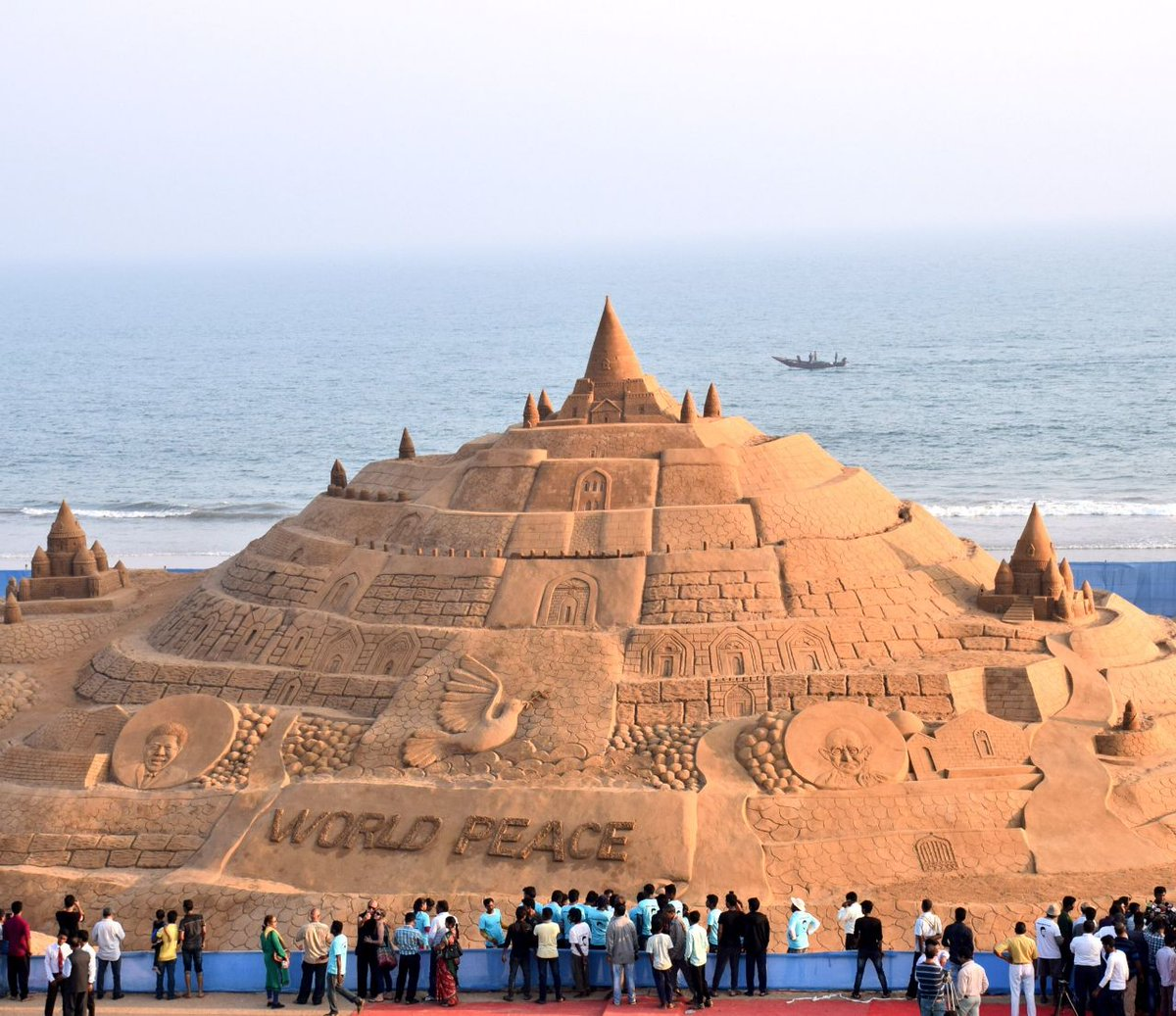
Guinness World Record for world's tallest sand castle at Puri Beach by Sudarshan Pattanaik

Sudarsan Pattnaik (Odia: ସୁଦର୍ଶନ ପଟ୍ଟନାୟକ, romanized: Sudårśåna Påṭṭånāẏåkå, Odia pronunciation: [s̪ud̪ɔɾʃɔn̪ɔ pɔʈːɔn̪ɑjɔkɔ]; born 15 April 1977) is an Indian sand artist from Puri, Odisha. In 2014, the Government of India honoured him with the Padma Shri, India's fourth-highest civilian award, for his seashore sand arts.

== Early life and background ==
Sudarsan Pattnaik was born in a Karan family in Marchikote Lane, Puri district, Odisha, in 1977. In February 2017, he broke the Guinness world record for making the world's largest sand castle, which was located on Puri Beach, Odisha. His record was broken by Skulptura Projects GmbH in Binz, Mecklenburg-Vorpommern, Germany, in June 2019.

== Awards and achievements ==
- He was awarded the Padma Shri by Government of India, the fourth highest civilian award in India, in 2014 for his contribution in Sand Arts.
- People's Choice Award at Sand Sculpting World Cup 2014 at Atlantic City, New Jersey, US.
- First Indian to win the Italian Sand Art Award, 2019, at the International Scorrano Sand Nativity event held in Lecce, Italy from 13 to 17 November.
- Fred Darrington Sand Master Award in London, UK in 2025.
