= Continental shelf of Bangladesh =

The continental shelf of Bangladesh refers to the submerged portion of the country's territory in the Bay of Bengal, which is part of the Indian Ocean. This continental shelf lies within Bangladesh's maritime boundary.

== Area of the continental shelf ==
In coastal countries, the seabed that gradually slopes downward underwater towards the sea is called the continental shelf. The continental shelf is considered an extension of the respective country's land territory. The extent of Bangladesh's continental shelf varies depending on the location. For instance, in the southern coastal region between Hiron Point and the Swatch of No Ground, the shelf extends less than 100 kilometres. On the other hand, on the Cox's Bazar coast, the continental shelf extends over 250 kilometres. The first 12 nautical miles from a country's landmass into the sea is regarded as that country's sovereign maritime zone. The following 200 nautical miles comprise the Exclusive Economic Zone (EEZ), and beyond that, up to 300 nautical miles, lies the continental shelf. The respective country owns the marine resources within the continental shelf area. However, vessels from any country are permitted to navigate through this area.

In 2014, following the decision of the Permanent Court of Arbitration, which resolved maritime boundary disputes with India and Myanmar, Bangladesh secured ownership over a maritime area of 118,813 square kilometres adjacent to its coastline. This includes an Exclusive Economic Zone of 200 nautical miles and sovereign rights over all living and non-living resources located in the continental shelf up to 354 nautical miles from the Chattogram coast.

== India's claim ==
In April 2021, neighboring India raised objections to Bangladesh's claim over the continental shelf in the Bay of Bengal. According to India, the coastline used by Bangladesh to define its continental shelf boundary overlaps with a part of India's own continental shelf. India submitted a petition to the international body, the Commission on the Limits of the Continental Shelf, requesting that Bangladesh's claim not be considered. In response, on 13 September 2021, Bangladesh sent a letter of rejection to the Secretary-General of the United Nations.
