= Insular South Asia =

Islands of South Asia

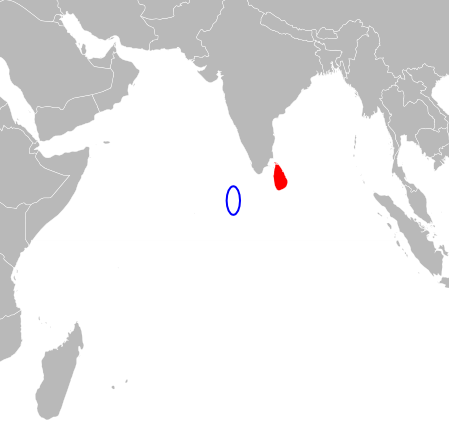
A depiction of Sri Lanka and the Maldives, the two small island nations in the narrow definition of Insular South Asia.

Insular South Asia is an ill-defined region, consisting at a minimum of all islands in the Southern region of Asia below the mainland Indian subcontinent, principally Sri Lanka, the Maldives and the Laccadives. Other sources also apply the term to Andaman and Nicobar Islands and the Malay Archipelago (encompassing the Southeast Asian countries — Brunei, Indonesia, East Malaysia, the Philippines, Singapore and East Timor).

It was an important region during the initial European colonisation of South Asia and Southeast Asia.

== See also ==
- Maritime Southeast Asia
- Southern South Asia
- List of islands of India
