= Puri Beach =

Beach in Puri, India

Coordinates: 19.81°N 85.83°E

Puri beach
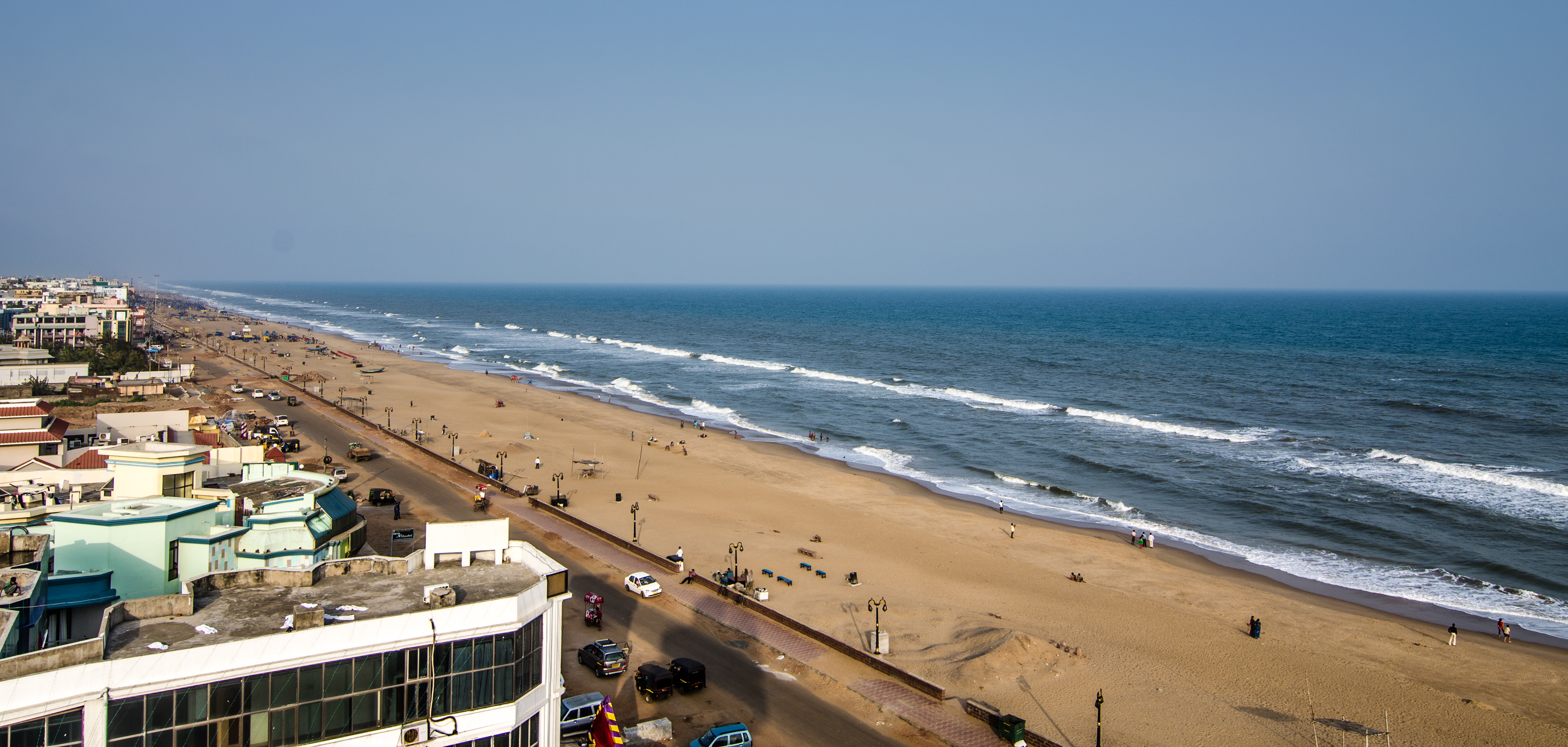
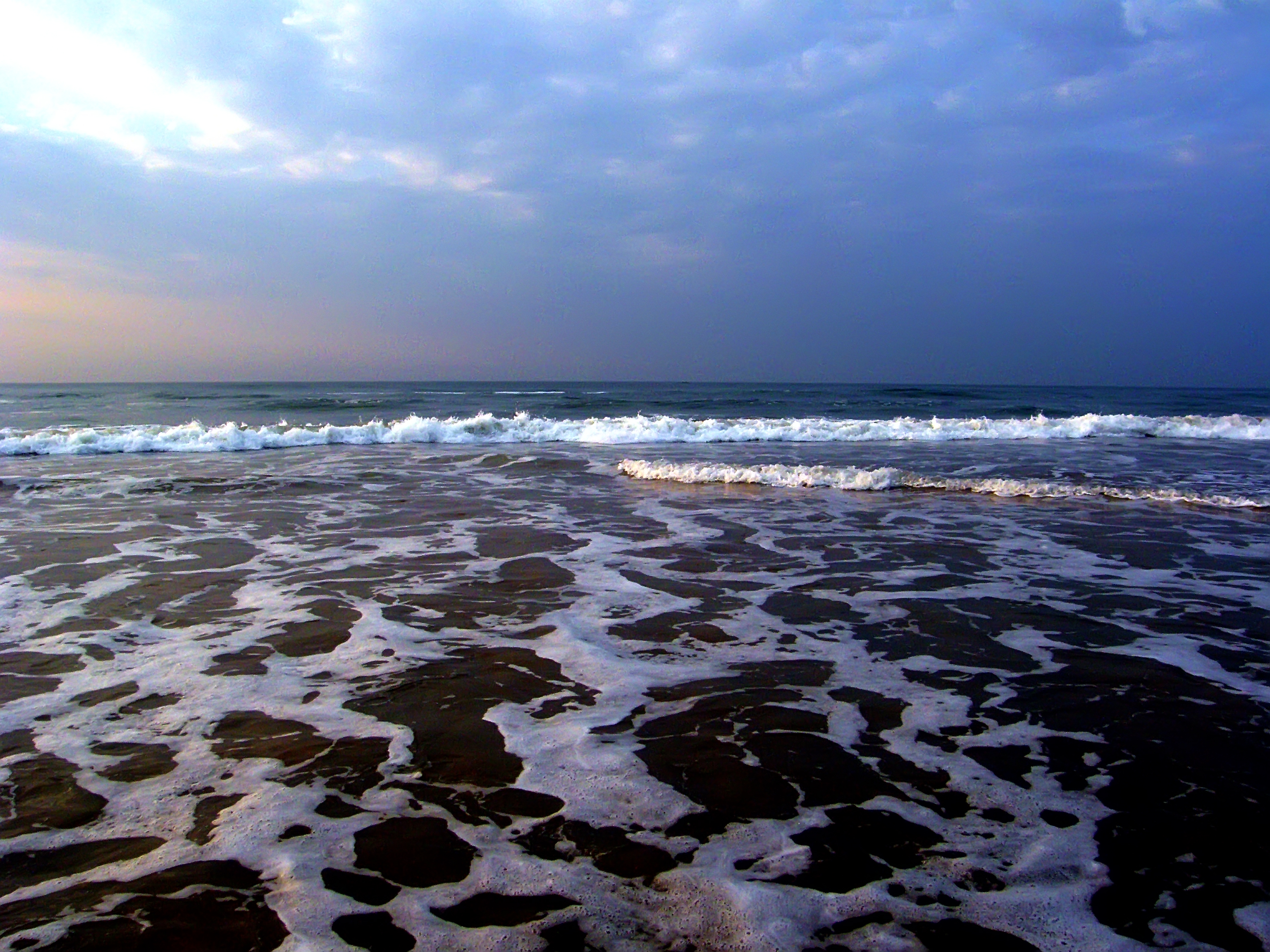
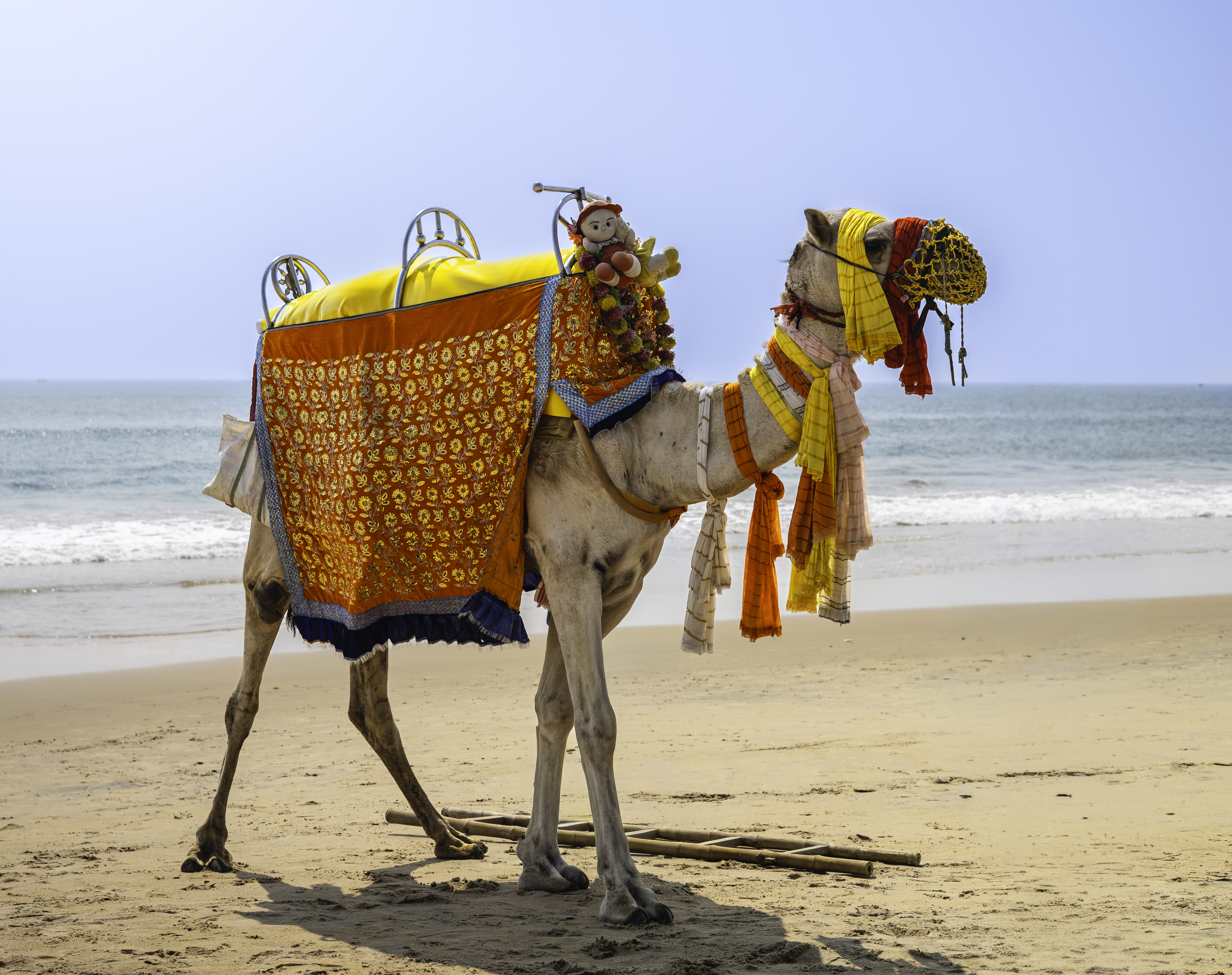
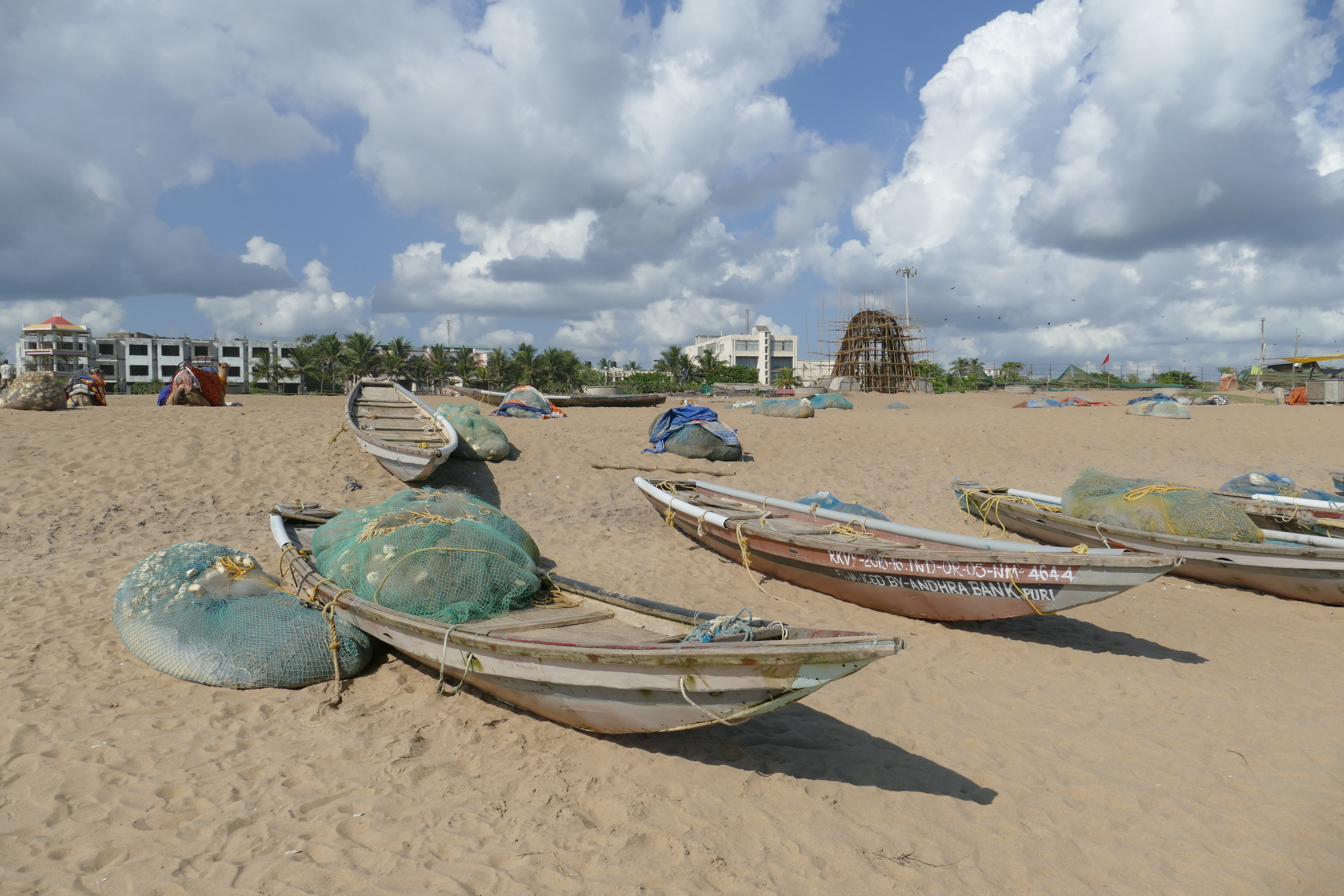
- Location: Puri, Odisha, India
- Coast: Bay of Bengal
- Type: Natural Sandy Beach
- Governing authority: OTDC

Puri Beach or the Golden beach is a beach in the city of Puri in the state of Odisha, India. It is on the shore of the Bay of Bengal. It is known for being a tourist attraction and a Hindu sacred place. The beach is the site of the annual Puri Beach Festival, which is co-sponsored by the Indian Ministry of Tourism, the city of Puri , the Development Commissioner of Handicrafts, and the Eastern Zonal Cultural Center, Kolkata.

The beach hosts sand art displays, including work by international award-winning local sand artist Sudarshan Pattnaik. The Golden Beach at Puri was awarded the prestigious 'Blue Flag' tag on October 11, 2020 by the Foundation for Environment Education (FEE), Denmark.

== Transportation ==
Puri Beach is located at the city of Puri and the distance between Puri railway station and the beach is only 2 km. The nearest airport, Biju Patnaik Airport, is located in Bhubaneswar, which is 60 km away. Buses and Taxis are available for local transportation.
