= INS Jatayu =

Indian naval base

- Minicoy, Lakshadweep Islands

Site information
- Type: Naval station
- Controlled by: Indian Navy
- Open to the public: no
- Condition: Active

Location
- Location of INS Jatayu INS Jatayu (India)
- Coordinates: 8.271900°N 73.021280°E

Site history
- Built: 2024
- In use: 2024–present

Garrison information
- Current commander: Commander Sudhanshu Bhardwaj
- Occupants: Southern Naval Command

INS Jatayu is a naval base of the Southern Naval Command of the Indian Navy located on Minicoy island in the Lakshadweep archipelago. It was commissioned on 6 March 2024.

== History ==
Positioned on the southernmost island of Lakshadweep, Minicoy is located between 8° 15’ to 8° 20’ N and 73° 01’ to 73° 05 E and spans 4.4 square km, including Viringili atoll. It is an autonomous oceanic island separated from the rest of Lakshadweep by the Nine Degree Channel and from the Maldives by the Eight Degree Channel, which overlooks crucial Sea Lines of Communication (SLOC). To boost its role in India's maritime security, in the early 1980s, a Naval Detachment Minicoy was established under the operational command of the Naval Officer-in-Charge (Lakshadweep).

In March 2024, the detachment was elevated to a naval base to support the Indian Navy's operations concerning anti-piracy and anti-narcotics domains in the Arabian Sea. The base was equipped with requisite infrastructure and resources. INS Jatayu is the second naval base in Lakshadweep after INS Dweeprakshak. The base will function under Nava Officer-in-Charge (Lakshadweep), Southern Naval Command. The first Commanding Officer of the independent naval unit is Commander Vrat Baghel. Maritime Operations Center at Minicoy was also inaugurated after commissioning the base.

According to the reports, the base is expected to provide comparable capabilities in the Arabian Sea, mirroring the role of INS Baaz located in the Andaman and Nicobar Islands in the eastern region.

The Indian Air Force is also building an air base on the island to support the operations from here as of December 2025.
