= Pitti Island =

Pitti Island may refer to:

- Pitti, an island on Pitti Bank, 24 km north of Kavaratti, Lakshadweep, India
- Pitti (Kalpeni), another small island in Lakshadweep, India which is part of the Kalpeni Atoll
- Pitti (Suheli), a long sandbank in Suheli Par, India
