= Pitti (disambiguation) =

Pitti is an uninhabited islet in the Indian Ocean, 24 km north of Kavaratti, Lakshadweep, India.

Pitti may also refer to:

- Pitti (Kalpeni), another small island in Lakshadweep, India which is part of the Kalpeni Atoll
- Pitti (Suheli), a long sandbank in Suheli Par, India
- Palazzo Pitti, a palace in Florence, Italy
- François Pitti-Ferrandi (1838-1894), French doctor and politician
- John Pitti, Panamanian football referee
- José Luis Rodríguez Pittí, Panamense writer, videoartist and documentary photographer
- Luca Pitti, Florentine banker in the 15th century
- Nishant Pitti (born 1986), Indian-born Bollywood movie producer and the co-founder of EaseMyTrip
