= Circles of latitude between the 5th parallel north and the 10th parallel north =

Circles of latitude

Following are circles of latitude between the 5th parallel north and the 10th parallel north:

== 6th parallel north ==
6th parallel north (interactive map)

The 6th parallel north is a circle of latitude that is 6 degrees north of the Earth's equatorial plane. It crosses Africa, the Indian Ocean, Southeast Asia, the Pacific Ocean, South America, and the Atlantic Ocean.

Damage from the 2004 Indian Ocean earthquake and tsunami was concentrated at this latitude.

=== Around the world ===
Starting at the Prime Meridian and heading eastwards, the parallel 6° north passes through:

Coordinates	Country, territory or sea	Notes
6°0′N 0°0′E	Ghana	
6°0′N 1°3′E	Atlantic Ocean	Bight of Benin – passing just south of Lomé, Togo
6°0′N 4°53′E	Nigeria	
6°0′N 9°3′E	Cameroon	
6°0′N 14°26′E	Central African Republic	
6°0′N 26°46′E	South Sudan	
6°0′N 35°0′E	Ethiopia	
6°0′N 46°2′E	Somalia	
6°0′N 48°57′E	Indian Ocean	
6°0′N 73°4′E	Maldives	Passing through Shaviyani Atoll
6°0′N 73°17′E	Indian Ocean	
6°0′N 80°16′E	Sri Lanka	
6°0′N 80°46′E	Indian Ocean	Passing just north of Weh Island, Indonesia Passing just south of Indira Point, Great Nicobar, India
6°0′N 100°20′E	Malaysia	Kedah on Peninsular Malaysia
6°0′N 101°6′E	Thailand	Yala and Narathiwat provinces
6°0′N 101°58′E	Malaysia	Kelantan on Peninsular Malaysia
6°0′N 102°26′E	South China Sea	
6°0′N 116°2′E	Malaysia	Sabah – islands of Pulau Gaya and Borneo
6°0′N 117°42′E	Labuk Bay	
6°0′N 117°55′E	Malaysia	Sabah – island of Borneo
6°0′N 118°2′E	Sulu Sea	Passing between islands in the Sulu Archipelago, Philippines
6°0′N 120°53′E	Philippines	Islands of Jolo and Balanguingui
6°0′N 121°41′E	Celebes Sea	Passing just south of the island of Tongquil, Philippines
6°0′N 124°35′E	Philippines	Island of Mindanao
6°0′N 125°7′E	Sarangani Bay	
6°0′N 125°17′E	Philippines	Island of Mindanao
6°0′N 125°41′E	Pacific Ocean	Passing just north of Namoluk atoll, Federated States of Micronesia; Passing just north of Ngatik atoll, Federated States of Micronesia; Passing just south of Pingelap atoll, Federated States of Micronesia
6°0′N 169°26′E	Marshall Islands	Jaluit Atoll
6°0′N 169°44′E	Pacific Ocean	
6°0′N 172°4′E	Marshall Islands	Mili Atoll
6°0′N 172°6′E	Pacific Ocean	Passing just north of Palmyra Atoll, United States Minor Outlying Islands
6°0′N 77°20′W	Colombia	
6°0′N 67°25′W	Venezuela	
6°0′N 61°19′W	Disputed area	Controlled by Guyana, claimed by Venezuela
6°0′N 58°34′W	Guyana	
6°0′N 57°9′W	Atlantic Ocean	
6°0′N 55°3′W	Suriname	Northernmost point – for about 3 km
6°0′N 55°1′W	Atlantic Ocean	
6°0′N 10°12′W	Liberia	
6°0′N 7°47′W	Ivory Coast	
6°0′N 3°5′W	Ghana	

== 7th parallel north ==
7th parallel north (interactive map)

The 7th parallel north is a circle of latitude that is 7 degrees north of the Earth's equatorial plane. It crosses Africa, the Indian Ocean, South Asia, Southeast Asia, the Pacific Ocean, South America, and the Atlantic Ocean.

=== Around the world ===
Starting at the Prime Meridian and heading eastwards, the parallel 7° north passes through:

Coordinates	Country, territory or sea	Notes
7°0′N 0°0′E	Ghana	Passing through Lake Volta
7°0′N 0°33′E	Togo	
7°0′N 1°38′E	Benin	
7°0′N 2°44′E	Nigeria	
7°0′N 10°7′E	Cameroon	For about 6 km
7°0′N 10°10′E	Nigeria	
7°0′N 10°33′E	Cameroon	For about 17 km
7°0′N 10°42′E	Nigeria	
7°0′N 11°40′E	Cameroon	
7°0′N 15°9′E	Central African Republic	
7°0′N 26°3′E	South Sudan	
7°0′N 34°16′E	Ethiopia	
7°0′N 47°1′E	Somalia	
7°0′N 49°22′E	Indian Ocean	
7°0′N 72°52′E	Maldives	Northern Thiladhunmathi Atoll
7°0′N 72°58′E	Indian Ocean	Laccadive Sea – passing just north of the island of Kelaa, Maldives
7°0′N 79°52′E	Sri Lanka	Passing just north of Colombo
7°0′N 81°52′E	Indian Ocean	Bay of Bengal
7°0′N 93°42′E	India	Andaman and Nicobar Islands – island of Great Nicobar
7°0′N 93°57′E	Indian Ocean	Andaman Sea
7°0′N 99°40′E	Thailand	Passing just south of Hat Yai
7°0′N 100°45′E	Gulf of Thailand	
7°0′N 103°2′E	South China Sea	
7°0′N 116°43′E	Malaysia	Sabah, island of Borneo – for about 6 km
7°0′N 116°47′E	South China Sea	Marudu Bay
7°0′N 117°7′E	Malaysia	Sabah, island of Borneo – for about 3 km
7°0′N 117°9′E	Sulu Sea	Passing just south of Malawali Island, Malaysia
7°0′N 118°25′E	Philippines	Island of Cagayan de Sulu
7°0′N 118°31′E	Sulu Sea	
7°0′N 121°55′E	Philippines	Island of Mindanao (Zamboanga Peninsula)
7°0′N 122°11′E	Celebes Sea	Moro Gulf – passing just north of Sacol Island, Philippines
7°0′N 123°59′E	Philippines	Island of Mindanao
7°0′N 125°30′E	Davao Gulf	
7°0′N 125°43′E	Philippines	Island of Samal
7°0′N 125°47′E	Davao Gulf	
7°0′N 125°59′E	Philippines	Island of Mindanao
7°0′N 126°27′E	Pacific Ocean	Philippine Sea
7°0′N 134°14′E	Palau	Island of Peleliu
7°0′N 134°16′E	Pacific Ocean	Passing just south of Truk Lagoon, Federated States of Micronesia
7°0′N 158°14′E	Federated States of Micronesia	Parempei island (just to the north of Pohnpei island)
7°0′N 158°15′E	Pacific Ocean	Passing just south of Ailinglaplap Atoll, Marshall Islands; Passing just south of Majuro atoll, Federated States of Micronesia
7°0′N 171°35′E	Marshall Islands	Arno Atoll
7°0′N 171°45′E	Pacific Ocean	Passing just south of Jicarón island, and the Azuero Peninsula, Panama
7°0′N 77°40′W	Colombia	
7°0′N 71°1′W	Venezuela	For about 18 km
7°0′N 70°57′W	Colombia	
7°0′N 70°26′W	Venezuela	
7°0′N 60°21′W	Disputed area	Controlled by Guyana, claimed by Venezuela
7°0′N 58°27′W	Guyana	Island of Wakenaam
7°0′N 58°23′W	Atlantic Ocean	
7°0′N 11°37′W	Sierra Leone	
7°0′N 11°27′W	Liberia	
7°0′N 8°17′W	Ivory Coast	
7°0′N 3°7′W	Ghana	

== 8th parallel north ==
8th parallel north (interactive map)

The 8th parallel north is a circle of latitude that is 8 degrees north of the Earth's equatorial plane. It crosses Africa, the Indian Ocean, South Asia, Southeast Asia, the Pacific Ocean, Central America, South America, and the Atlantic Ocean.

The parallel defines part of the border between Somalia and Ethiopia. The Eight Degree Channel (Maliku Kandu) in the Indian Ocean is named after the parallel.

=== Around the world ===
Starting at the Prime Meridian and heading eastwards, the parallel 8° north passes through:

Coordinates	Country, territory or sea	Notes
8°0′N 0°0′E	Ghana	Passing through Lake Volta
8°0′N 0°36′E	Togo	
8°0′N 1°38′E	Benin	
8°0′N 2°42′E	Nigeria	
8°0′N 12°13′E	Cameroon	
8°0′N 15°25′E	Chad	
8°0′N 18°1′E	Central African Republic	
8°0′N 24°58′E	South Sudan	
8°0′N 33°2′E	Ethiopia	
8°0′N 46°59′E	Somalia / Ethiopia border	
8°0′N 47°59′E	Somalia	
8°0′N 49°53′E	Indian Ocean	Passing through the Arabian Sea; Into the Eight Degree Channel - passing just south of Minicoy Island, India; And into the Laccadive Sea - passing just south of Kanyakumari(Cape Comorin), India
8°0′N 79°43′E	Sri Lanka	
8°0′N 81°30′E	Indian Ocean	Bay of Bengal
8°0′N 93°20′E	India	Andaman and Nicobar Islands - islands of Katchal, Camorta and Nancowry
8°0′N 93°34′E	Indian Ocean	Andaman Sea
8°0′N 98°17′E	Thailand	Island of Phuket
8°0′N 98°25′E	Phang Nga Bay	
8°0′N 98°35′E	Thailand	Island of Ko Yao Yai
8°0′N 98°36′E	Phang Nga Bay	
8°0′N 98°58′E	Thailand	Krabi and Nakhon Si Thammarat provinces
8°0′N 100°19′E	Gulf of Thailand	
8°0′N 104°4′E	South China Sea	
8°0′N 116°57′E	Philippines	Balabac Island
8°0′N 117°4′E	Sulu Sea	
8°0′N 122°17′E	Philippines	Island of Mindanao
8°0′N 126°24′E	Pacific Ocean	Passing just south of Kayangel atoll, Palau; Passing just south of Pikelot island, Federated States of Micronesia
8°0′N 168°5′E	Marshall Islands	Namu Atoll
8°0′N 168°11′E	Pacific Ocean	Passing just south of Aur Atoll, Marshall Islands; Passing just south of Burica Point, Panama/Costa Rica; Passing just north of Islas Secas, Panama
8°0′N 81°40′W	Panama	
8°0′N 80°24′W	Pacific Ocean	Gulf of Panama
8°0′N 78°25′W	Panama	
8°0′N 77°12′W	Colombia	Passing through the Gulf of Urabá
8°0′N 72°25′W	Venezuela	Just south of Upata
8°0′N 60°8′W	Disputed area	Controlled by Guyana, claimed by Venezuela
8°0′N 59°6′W	Atlantic Ocean	
8°0′N 12°53′W	Sierra Leone	
8°0′N 10°36′W	Liberia	
8°0′N 9°25′W	Guinea	
8°0′N 8°3′W	Ivory Coast	
8°0′N 2°41′W	Ghana	Passing through Lake Volta

== 9th parallel north ==
9th parallel north (interactive map)

The 9th parallel north is a circle of latitude that is 9 degrees north of the Earth's equatorial plane. It crosses Africa, the Indian Ocean, South Asia, Southeast Asia, the Pacific Ocean, Central America, South America, and the Atlantic Ocean.

=== Around the world ===
Starting at the Prime Meridian and heading eastwards, the parallel 9° north passes through:

Coordinates	Country, territory or sea	Notes
9°0′N 0°0′E	Ghana	
9°0′N 0°28′E	Togo	
9°0′N 1°38′E	Benin	
9°0′N 2°47′E	Nigeria	Passing just south of Abuja
9°0′N 12°51′E	Cameroon	
9°0′N 14°34′E	Chad	
9°0′N 19°3′E	Central African Republic	
9°0′N 23°28′E	Sudan	For about 11 km
9°0′N 23°34′E	Central African Republic	For about 3 km
9°0′N 23°35′E	Sudan	
9°0′N 24°33′E	South Sudan	
9°0′N 34°8′E	Ethiopia	Passing through Addis Ababa
9°0′N 44°0′E	Somalia	Passing through Somaliland
9°0′N 50°34′E	Indian Ocean	Passing through the Arabian Sea
9°0′N 76°31′E	India	Kerala; Tamil Nadu
9°0′N 78°16′E	Indian Ocean	Gulf of Mannar
9°0′N 79°51′E	Sri Lanka	Mannar Island and mainland
9°0′N 80°57′E	Indian Ocean	Bay of Bengal; Passing just south of Car Nicobar island, India; Andaman Sea
9°0′N 98°15′E	Thailand	Island of Ko Kho Khao and the mainland
9°0′N 99°56′E	Gulf of Thailand	
9°0′N 104°48′E	Vietnam	
9°0′N 105°25′E	South China Sea	Passing through the disputed Spratly Islands
9°0′N 117°37′E	Philippines	Island of Palawan
9°0′N 118°4′E	Sulu Sea	
9°0′N 123°0′E	Bohol Sea	
9°0′N 124°48′E	Philippines	Island of Mindanao
9°0′N 124°53′E	Bohol Sea	Gingoog Bay
9°0′N 125°10′E	Philippines	Island of Mindanao
9°0′N 125°16′E	Bohol Sea	Butuan Bay
9°0′N 125°29′E	Philippines	Island of Mindanao
9°0′N 126°16′E	Pacific Ocean	Passing just north of Namonuito Atoll, Federated States of Micronesia
9°0′N 165°38′E	Marshall Islands	Passing through Ujae Atoll
9°0′N 165°43′E	Pacific Ocean	Passing just north of Lae Atoll, Marshall Islands
9°0′N 167°34′E	Marshall Islands	Passing through Kwajalein Atoll
9°0′N 167°44′E	Pacific Ocean	Passing just south of Erikub Atoll, Marshall Islands; Passing just north of Maloelap Atoll, Marshall Islands
9°0′N 83°38′W	Costa Rica	
9°0′N 82°46′W	Panama	Passing through Chiriquí Lagoon
9°0′N 81°42′W	Caribbean Sea	
9°0′N 80°44′W	Panama	Passing through the outskirts of Panama City
9°0′N 79°29′W	Pacific Ocean	Gulf of Panama
9°0′N 79°7′W	Panama	
9°0′N 77°45′W	Caribbean Sea	Gulf of Darién
9°0′N 76°16′W	Colombia	
9°0′N 72°44′W	Venezuela	
9°0′N 60°49′W	Atlantic Ocean	
9°0′N 13°17′W	Sierra Leone	
9°0′N 10°36′W	Guinea	
9°0′N 7°55′W	Ivory Coast	
9°0′N 2°39′W	Ghana	

== 10th parallel north ==
10th parallel north (interactive map)

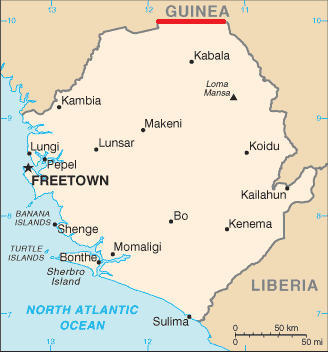
The 10th parallel north defines part of the border between Sierra Leone and Guinea.

The 10th parallel north is a circle of latitude that is 10 degrees north of the Earth's equatorial plane. It crosses Africa, the Indian Ocean, the Indian subcontinent, Southeast Asia, the Pacific Ocean, Central America, South America, and the Atlantic Ocean.

At this latitude the sun is visible for 12 hours, 43 minutes during the summer solstice and 11 hours, 33 minutes during the winter solstice.

On 21 June, the maximum altitude of the sun is 103.44 degrees and 56.56 degrees on 21 December. In this case an angle larger than 90° means that the culmination takes place at a maximum altitude of 76.56 degrees in the opposite cardinal direction. In the northern torrid zone, the Sun remains in the south during winter, but can reach over the zenith to the north in midsummer.

A section of the border between Guinea and Sierra Leone is defined by the parallel.

The Ten Degree Channel in the Indian Ocean is named after the parallel.

=== Around the world ===
Starting at the Prime Meridian and heading eastwards, the parallel 10° north passes through:

Coordinates	Country, territory or sea	Notes
10°0′N 0°0′E	Ghana	
10°0′N 0°21′E	Togo	
10°0′N 1°21′E	Benin	
10°0′N 3°37′E	Nigeria	
10°0′N 13°15′E	Cameroon	
10°0′N 14°17′E	Chad	
10°0′N 14°32′E	Cameroon	
10°0′N 15°41′E	Chad	
10°0′N 21°23′E	Central African Republic	
10°0′N 23°36′E	Sudan	
10°0′N 25°0′E	South Sudan	
10°0′N 26°7′E	Sudan	
10°0′N 27°50′E	Abyei	Area controlled by Sudan, and claimed by South Sudan
10°0′N 29°0′E	Sudan	
10°0′N 29°32′E	South Sudan	
10°0′N 30°28′E	Sudan	
10°0′N 31°30′E	South Sudan	
10°0′N 34°0′E	Sudan	
10°0′N 34°13′E	Ethiopia	
10°0′N 43°3′E	Somalia	Passing through Somaliland
10°0′N 50°54′E	Indian Ocean	Arabian Sea; Passing just south of the island of Kalpeni, India; Laccadive Sea
10°0′N 76°13′E	India	Kerala — passing through Kochi; Tamil Nadu
10°0′N 79°13′E	Indian Ocean	Bay of Bengal; Ten Degree Channel (between the Andaman and Nicobar Islands, India); Andaman Sea
10°0′N 98°10′E	Myanmar (Burma)	Island of Zadetkyi Kyun in the Mergui Archipelago
10°0′N 98°15′E	Indian Ocean	Andaman Sea
10°0′N 98°32′E	Myanmar (Burma)	Kawthaung
10°0′N 98°35′E	Thailand	Ranong and Chumphon provinces
10°0′N 99°9′E	Gulf of Thailand	Passing just south of the island of Ko Tao, Thailand; Passing just south of the island of Phú Quốc, Vietnam
10°0′N 105°5′E	Vietnam	
10°0′N 106°39′E	South China Sea	Passing through the disputed Spratly Islands
10°0′N 118°38′E	Philippines	Island of Palawan
10°0′N 119°0′E	Sulu Sea	
10°0′N 122°42′E	Philippines	Island of Negros
10°0′N 123°13′E	Tañon Strait	
10°0′N 123°14′E	Philippines	Island of Cebu
10°0′N 123°37′E	Cebu Strait	
10°0′N 124°3′E	Philippines	Island of Bohol
10°0′N 124°34′E	Bohol Sea	Passing just south of the island of Leyte, Philippines
10°0′N 125°12′E	Philippines	Island of Panaon
10°0′N 125°17′E	Surigao Strait	
10°0′N 125°30′E	Philippines	Islands of Sibanac and Dinagat
10°0′N 125°40′E	Dinagat Sound	
10°0′N 126°2′E	Philippines	Island of Siargao
10°0′N 126°5′E	Pacific Ocean	
10°0′N 139°37′E	Federated States of Micronesia	Passing through Ulithi Atoll
10°0′N 139°48′E	Pacific Ocean	Passing just north of Ujelang Atoll, Marshall Islands; Passing just south of Wotho Atoll, Marshall Islands
10°0′N 169°1′E	Marshall Islands	Passing through Likiep Atoll
10°0′N 169°7′E	Pacific Ocean	
10°0′N 85°43′W	Costa Rica	Passing through the Gulf of Nicoya; Passing just north of San José
10°0′N 83°2′W	Caribbean Sea	
10°0′N 75°34′W	Colombia	
10°0′N 72°58′W	Venezuela	Passing through Lake Maracaibo
10°0′N 62°8′W	Atlantic Ocean	Passing just south of the island of Trinidad, Trinidad and Tobago
10°0′N 14°2′W	Guinea	
10°0′N 11°53′W	Guinea / Sierra Leone border	
10°0′N 11°12′W	Guinea	
10°0′N 8°8′W	Ivory Coast	
10°0′N 4°59′W	Burkina Faso	
10°0′N 2°46′W	Ghana	

=== Popular culture ===
In the end of part two of the Spanish television heist crime drama series La casa de papel, a point near Palawan island, Philippines, with the coordinates of 10th parallel north and 118,5º, was the meeting point of El Professor and Raquel one year after the heist.

== See also ==
- Circles of latitude between the Equator and the 5th parallel north
- Circles of latitude between the 10th parallel north and the 15th parallel north
