= Ten Degree Channel =

Channel in the Bay of Bengal

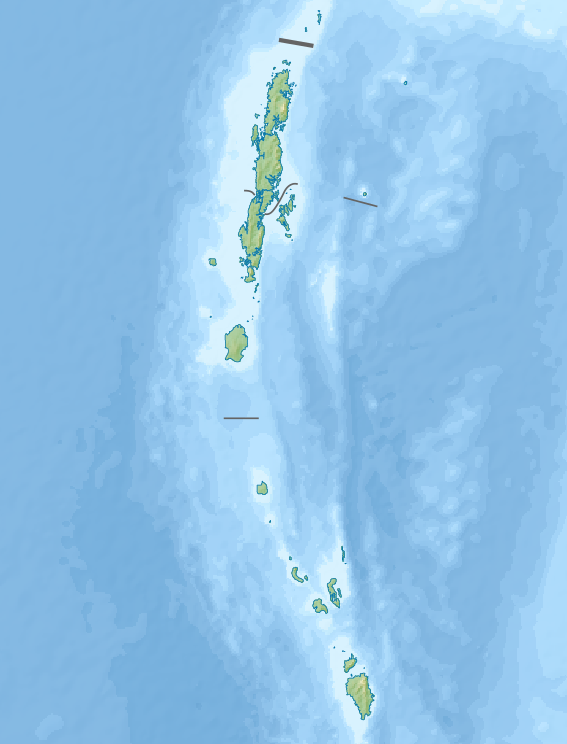
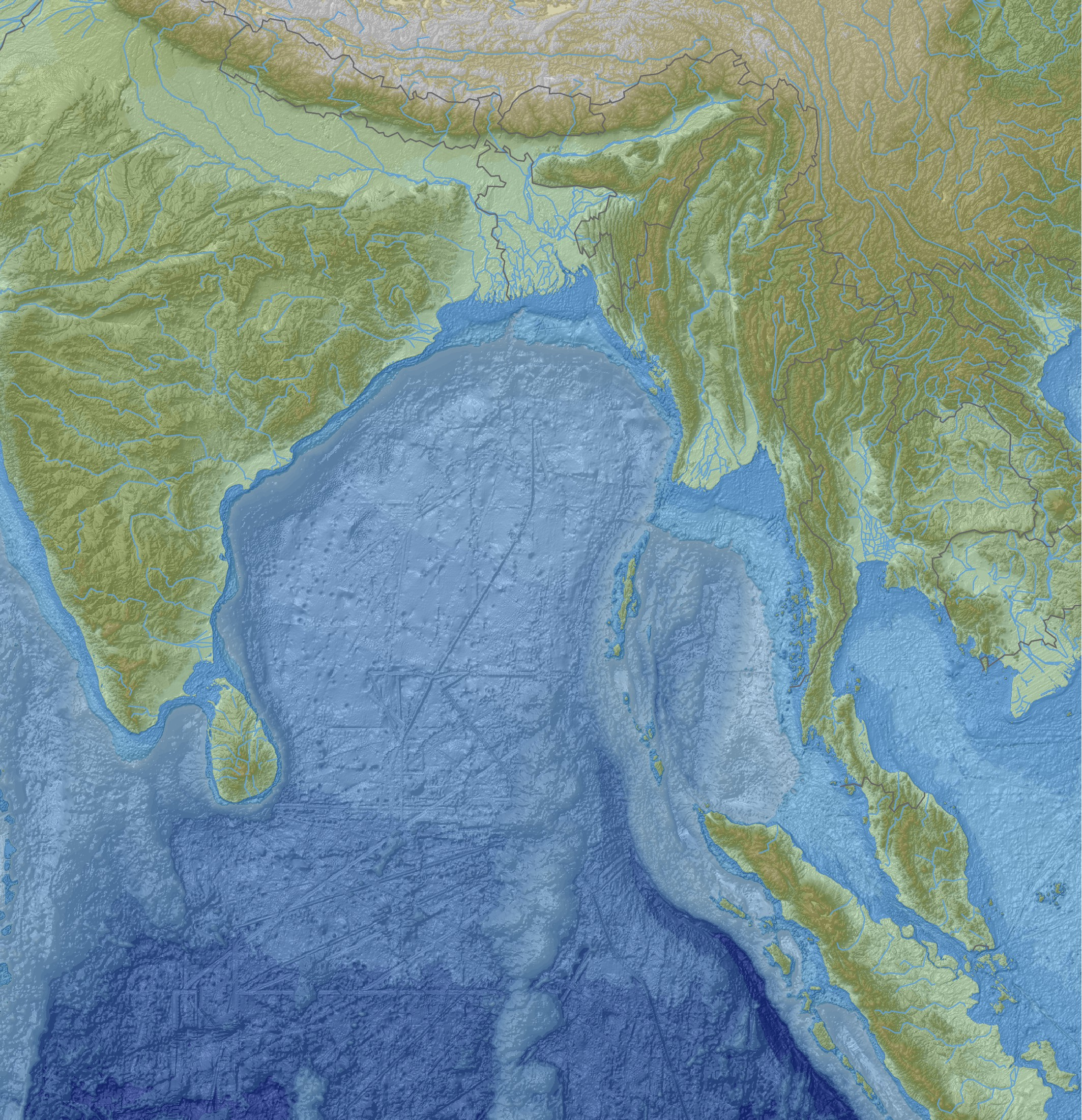
- Location in the Andaman and Nicobar Islands and the Bay of Bengal Ten Degree Channel (Bay of Bengal)
- Coordinates: 10°N 92.4828°E
- Type: Channel
- Part of: Indian Ocean

The Ten Degree Channel is a channel that separates the Andaman Islands and Nicobar Islands from each other in the Bay of Bengal. The two sets of islands together form the Indian Union Territory (UT) of Andaman and Nicobar Islands. This channel is 150 kilometres (93 mi) wide from north to south, and approximately 10 kilometres (6.2 mi) long from east to west. It has minimum depth of 7.3m and lies from east to west on the 10-degree line of latitude north of the equator, hence the name.

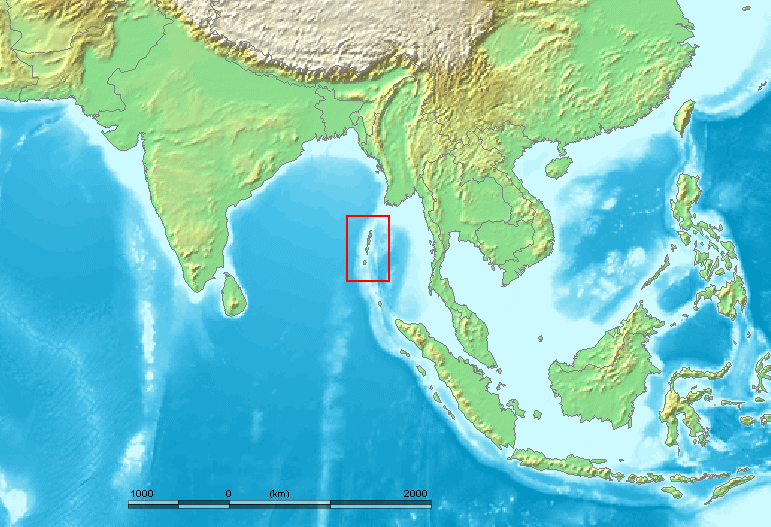
Ten Degree Channel is in the red square

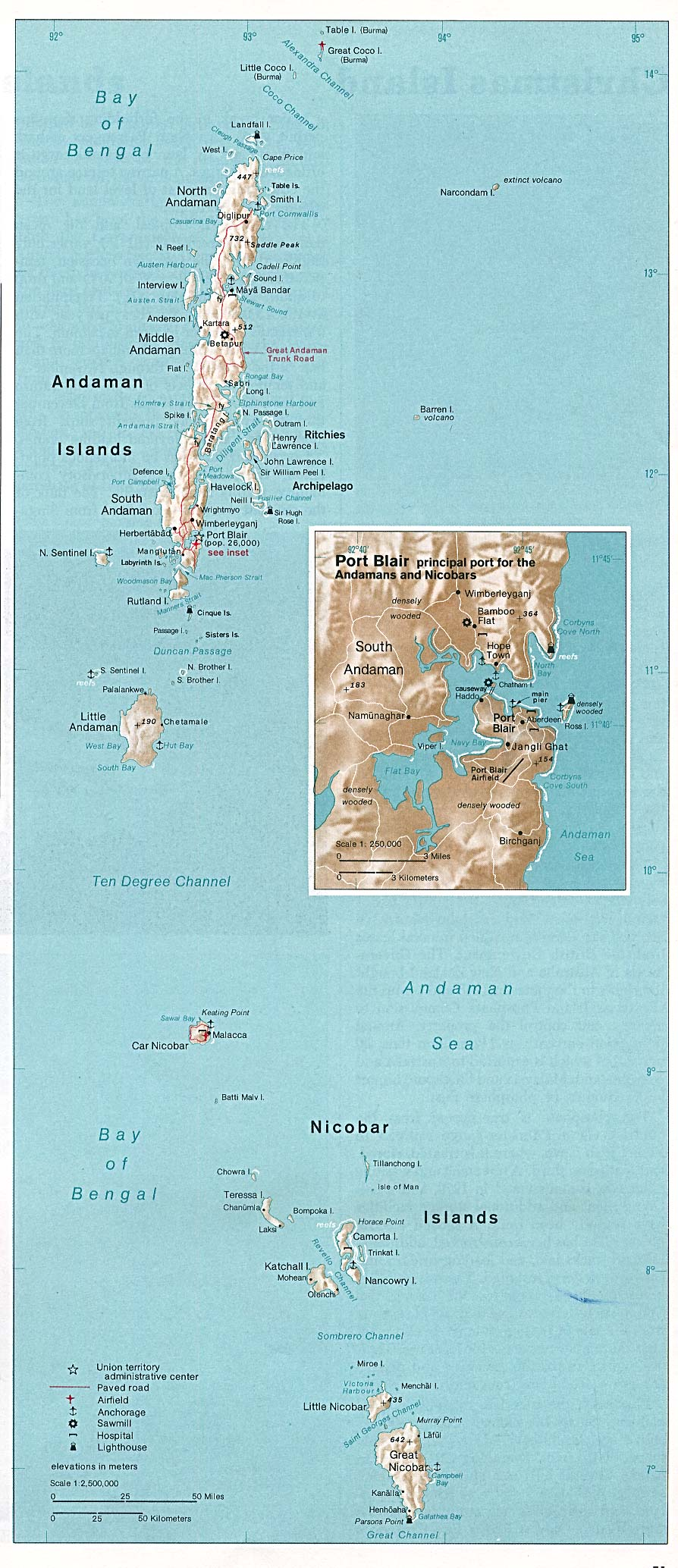
Andaman and Nicobar Islands map

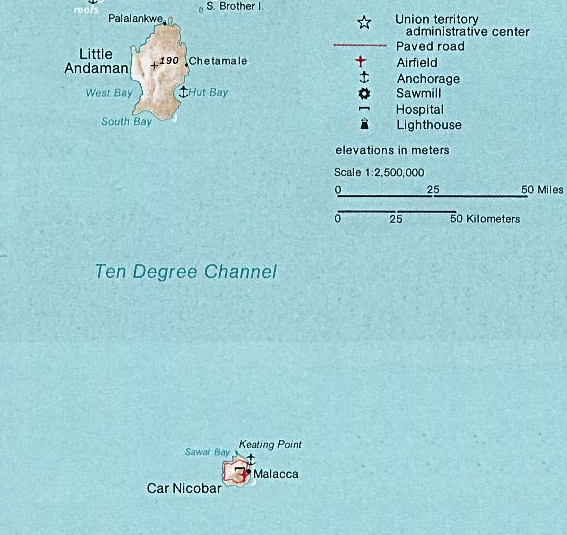
Ten Degrees Channel, closeup

== See also ==
- Andaman Sea
- Bay of Bengal
- Nine Degree Channel
- Coco Islands
- Preparis
- Exclusive economic zone of India
