= Laccadive Sea =

Body of water bordering India, the Maldives, and Sri Lanka

- Sea of Sri Lanka
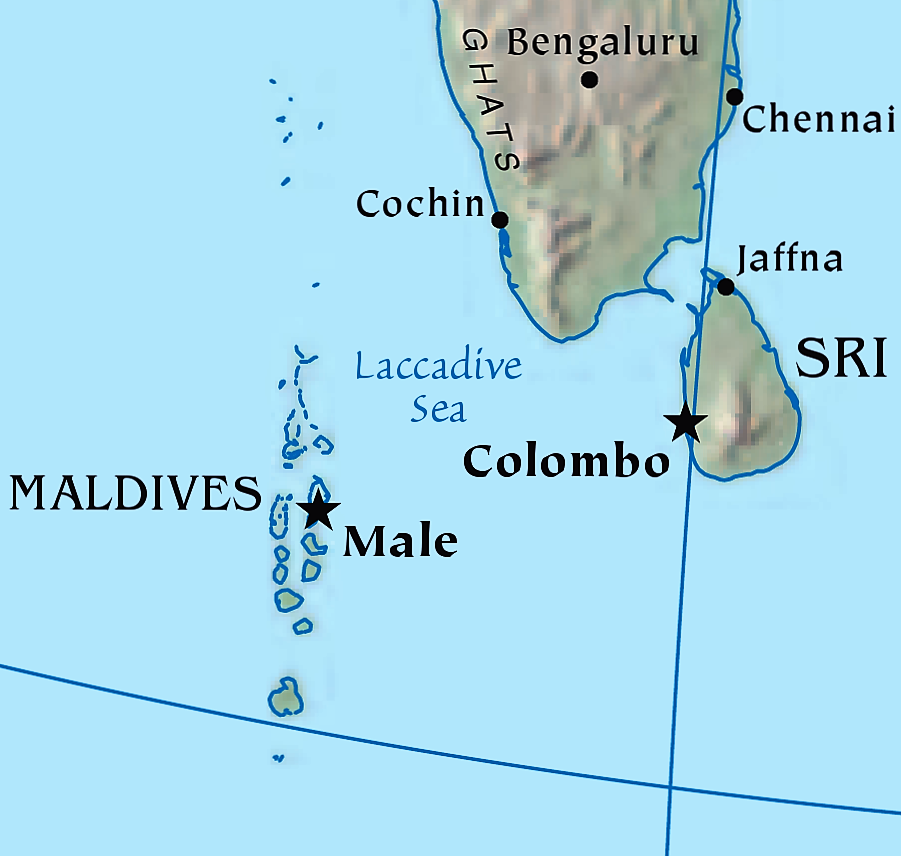
- Location of Laccadive Sea

- Location within India
- Coordinates: 08°N 75°E
- Type: Sea
- Basin countries: India, Sri Lanka, Maldives
- Surface area: 786,000 km^{2} (303,500 sq mi)
- Average depth: 1,929 m (6,329 ft)
- Max. depth: 4,131 m (13,553 ft)

The Laccadive Sea (/ˈlɑːkədiːv, ˈlækə-/ LAH-kə-deev, LAK-ə-), also known as the Lakshadweep Sea, is a body of water bordering India (including its Lakshadweep islands), the Maldives, and Sri Lanka. It is located to the southwest of Karnataka, to the west of Kerala and to the south of Tamil Nadu. This warm sea has a stable water temperature through the year and is rich in marine life, the Gulf of Mannar alone hosting approximately 3,600 species. Udupi, Mangaluru, Kasaragod, Kannur, Kozhikode, Ponnani, Kochi, Alappuzha, Kollam, Thiruvananthapuram, Tuticorin, Colombo, Negombo and Malé are the major cities on the shore of the Laccadive Sea. Kanyakumari, the southernmost tip of peninsular India, also borders this sea. It is named for the Laccadive Islands located in the northwest portion of the sea.

== Geography ==
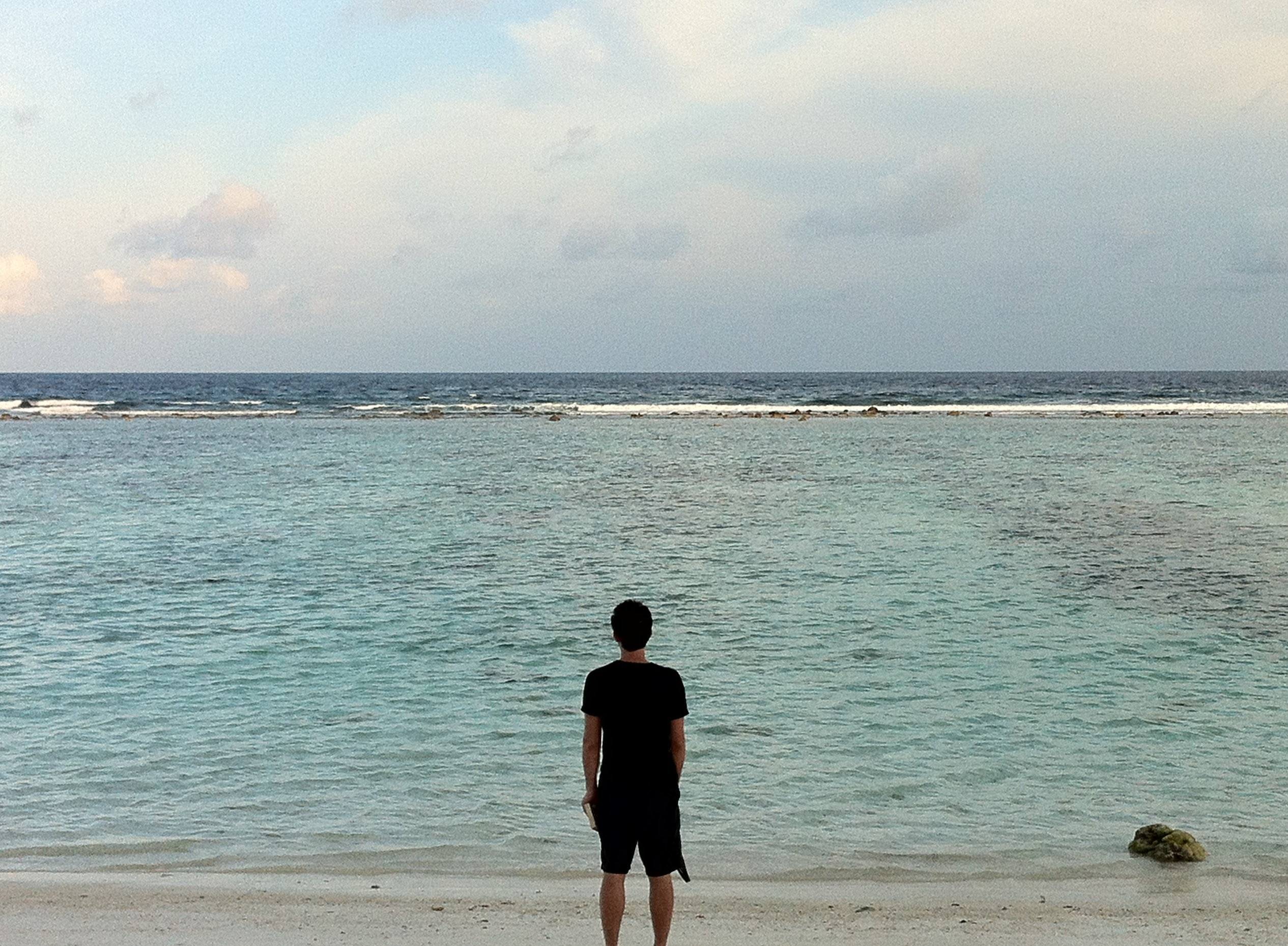
A view of the Laccadive Sea from Villingili

The International Hydrographic Organization defines the limits of the Laccadive Sea as follows:

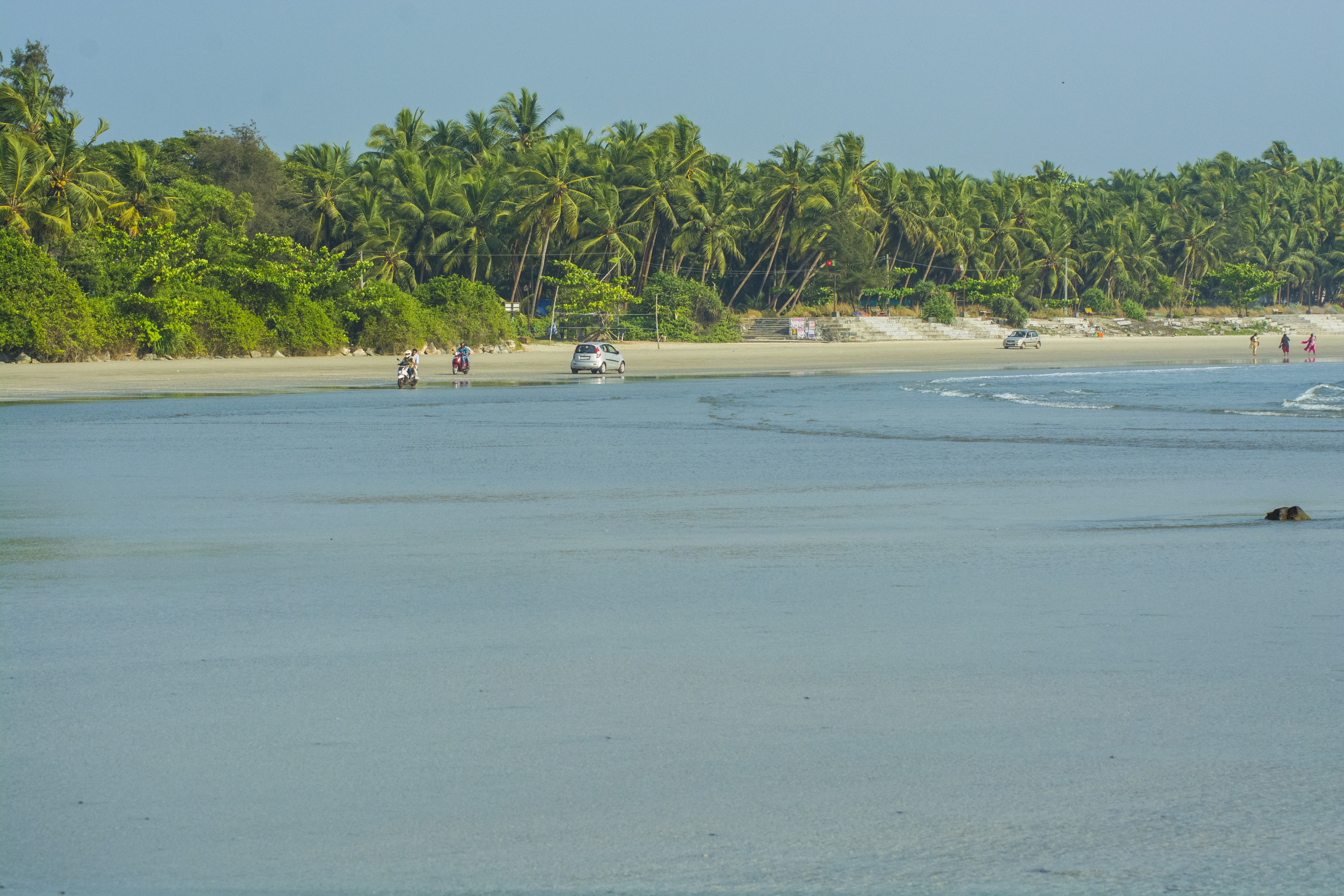
Laccadive seashore at Muzhappilangad, where also the longest Drive-in beach of Asia locates

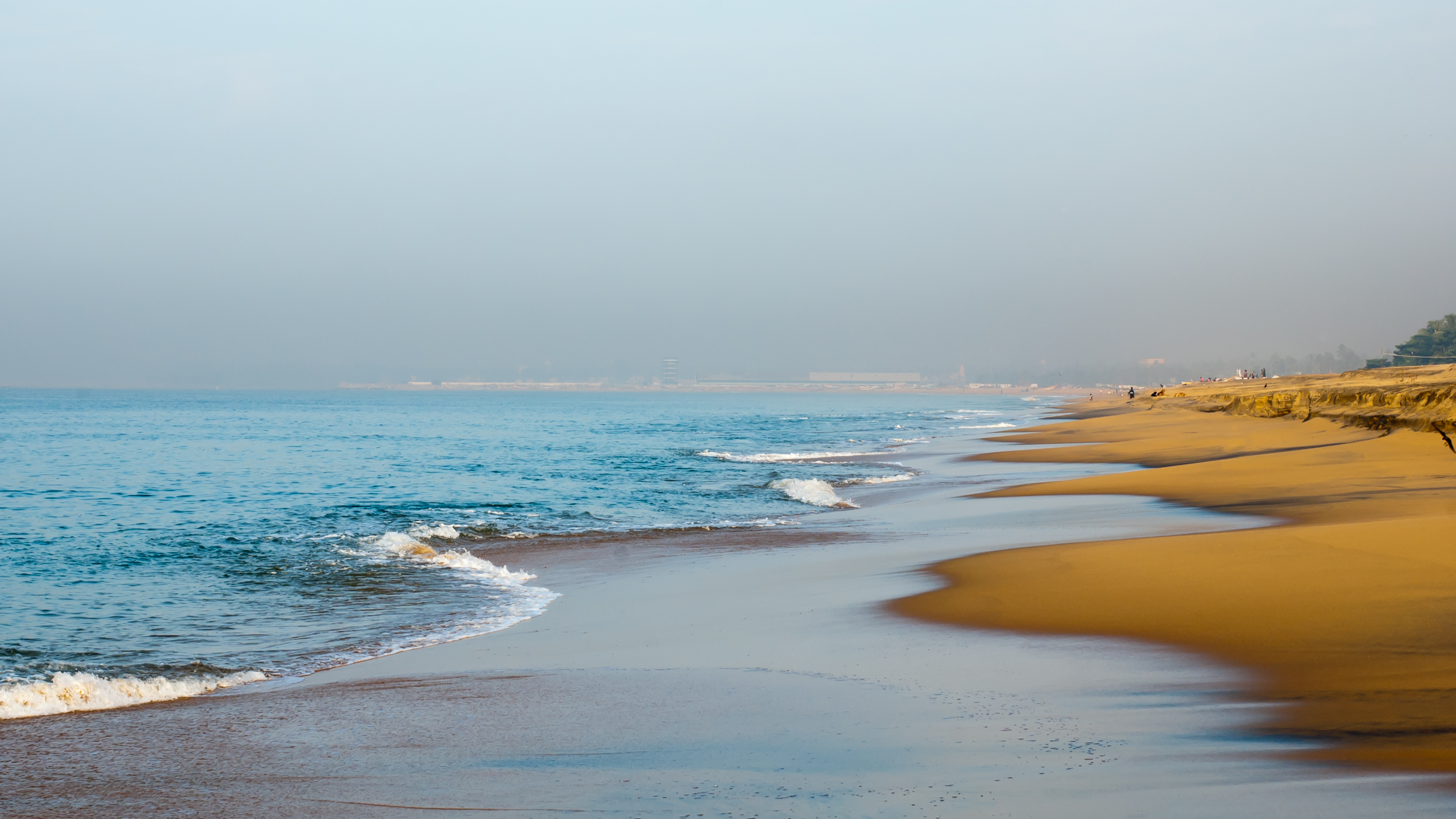
Laccadive seashore at Kollam Beach

- On the West. A line running from Sadashivgad Lt. on West Coast of India (14°48′N 74°07′E) to Corah Divh (13°42′N 72°10′E) and thence down the West side of the Laccadive and Maldive Archipelagos to the most Southerly point of Addu Atoll in the Maldives.
- On the South. A line running from Dondra Head in Sri Lanka to the most Southerly point of Addu Atoll.
- On the East. The West coasts of Sri Lanka and India.
- On the Northeast. Adams Bridge (between India and Sri Lanka).

Water temperature is rather constant through the year, averaging 26–28 °C in summer and 25 °C in winter. Salinity is 34‰ (parts per thousand) in the center and northern part and up to 35.5‰ in the south. The coasts are sandy and the deeper parts covered in silt. There are numerous coral reefs in the sea, such as the Lakshadweep islands which are made up of atolls and contain 105 coral species.

== Ecology ==
With about 3,600 species of flora and fauna, the Gulf of Mannar is regarded as one of the richest marine biological resources in the world. Of these 3,600 species, 44 are protected, 117 are corals, 79 crustaceans, 108 sponges, 260 mollusks, 441 fin fishes, 147 seaweeds and 17 mangroves. In 1986, a group of 21 islands and nearby waters with a total area of 560 km^{2} were declared as the Gulf of Mannar Marine National Park. The park and its buffer zone were designated as a Biosphere Reserve in 1989. The Gulf of Mannar Biosphere Reserve covers an area of 10,500 km^{2} of ocean, islands and the adjoining coastline, and is the largest such reserve in India. Most of its area is restricted for outsiders and the access of boats is subject to strict rules, but local people continue fishing activities which they crucially depend on.

About 150,000 people live in the buffer zone, and more than 70% of them depend on the coastal marine resources. There are about 125 fishing villages with 35,000 active fishers and 25,000 divers for sea cucumbers in the area, about 5,000 women collect seaweed. About 106,000 tonnes of fish were produced in the gulf in 2006, mostly oil sardines (Sardinella longiceps), lesser sardines(Sardinella spp.), ponyfish (Letognathus sp.), mackerel, penaeid shrimp, perches, squid (Sepioteuthis arctipinni), deep-sea lobster (Puerulus sewelli), crab (Varuna littorata), skates and sting rays. The seaweed collection aims at shallow-water species Gelidiella acerosa (marikozhundu passi), Gracilaria edulis (Agarophytes, Kanchi passi), Sargassum spp. (kattakorai), Turbinaria (Alginophyte, Pakoda passi) and Ulva lactuca, and is conducted between October and March. Because of National Park related restrictions, the production of seaweeds declined from 5,800 tonnes (dry weight) in 1978 to 3,250 tonnes in 2003.

== Economy ==
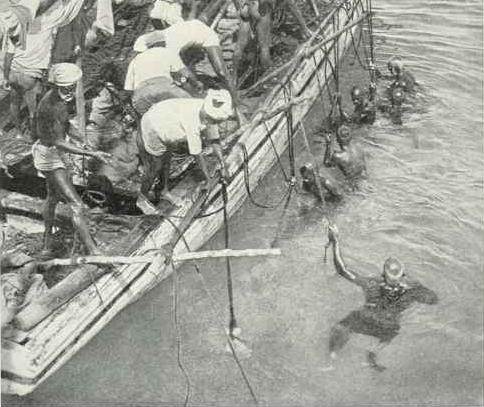
Pearl fishing in the Gulf of Mannar, ca. 1926

The Gulf of Mannar is known for its pearl banks of Pinctada radiata and Pinctada fucata for at least two thousand years. Pliny the Elder (23–79) praised the pearl fishery of the gulf as the most productive in the world. Although extraction of natural pearls is considered too expensive in most parts of the world, it is still conducted in the gulf. Also collected in large numbers are Shankha mollusks (Xancus pyrum) whose shells are used as a ritual and religious object. Other mollusks of the sea are either too scarce or not popular in Indian society and therefore have no commercial value.

Another traditional occupation in the Laccadive Sea is fishing. The annual fish catch is 2,000 to 5,000 tonnes from the Lakshadweep islands, which is mostly constituted by tuna (about 70%) and shark. Perches, halfbeaks, Carangidae, needlefish and rays are also caught near the reefs. Shrimp, Achelata and small fish, such as Sprattus, Pomacentridae and Apogonidae are widely used as a bait by the Laccadive islanders.

== Channels ==
The Laccadive Sea contains several important channels between island groups and the Indian mainland:

Major channels in the Laccadive Sea
| Channel | Location | Width (km) | Depth (m) | Connects | Notes |
|---|---|---|---|---|---|
| Eight Degree Channel | Between Minicoy and Maldives | ~150 | ~500 | Laccadive Sea to Arabian Sea | Named for its latitude (8°N) |
| Nine Degree Channel | Between Lakshadweep islands and Minicoy | ~200 | ~600 | Laccadive Sea proper to northern Arabian Sea | Named for its latitude (9°N) |
| One and Half Degree Channel | Southernmost Lakshadweep | ~100 | ~300 | Laccadive Sea to equatorial Indian Ocean | Named for its latitude (1.5°N) |
| Maldive Channel | Between Lakshadweep and Maldives | ~250 | ~1000 | Laccadive Sea to Central Indian Ocean | Major shipping route |
| Palk Strait (western end) | Between India and Sri Lanka | 55-85 | ~10 | Laccadive Sea to Bay of Bengal | Very shallow, limits ship traffic |

== See also ==
- Coastal India
- Arabian Sea
- Bay of Bengal

== Bibliography ==
- Marine Protected Areas in India, International Collective in Support of Fishworkers (ICSF), April 2008, ISBN 978-81-904590-9-9
