= Ali Manikfan =

Indian scientist

Ali Manikfan- Muraduganduvar
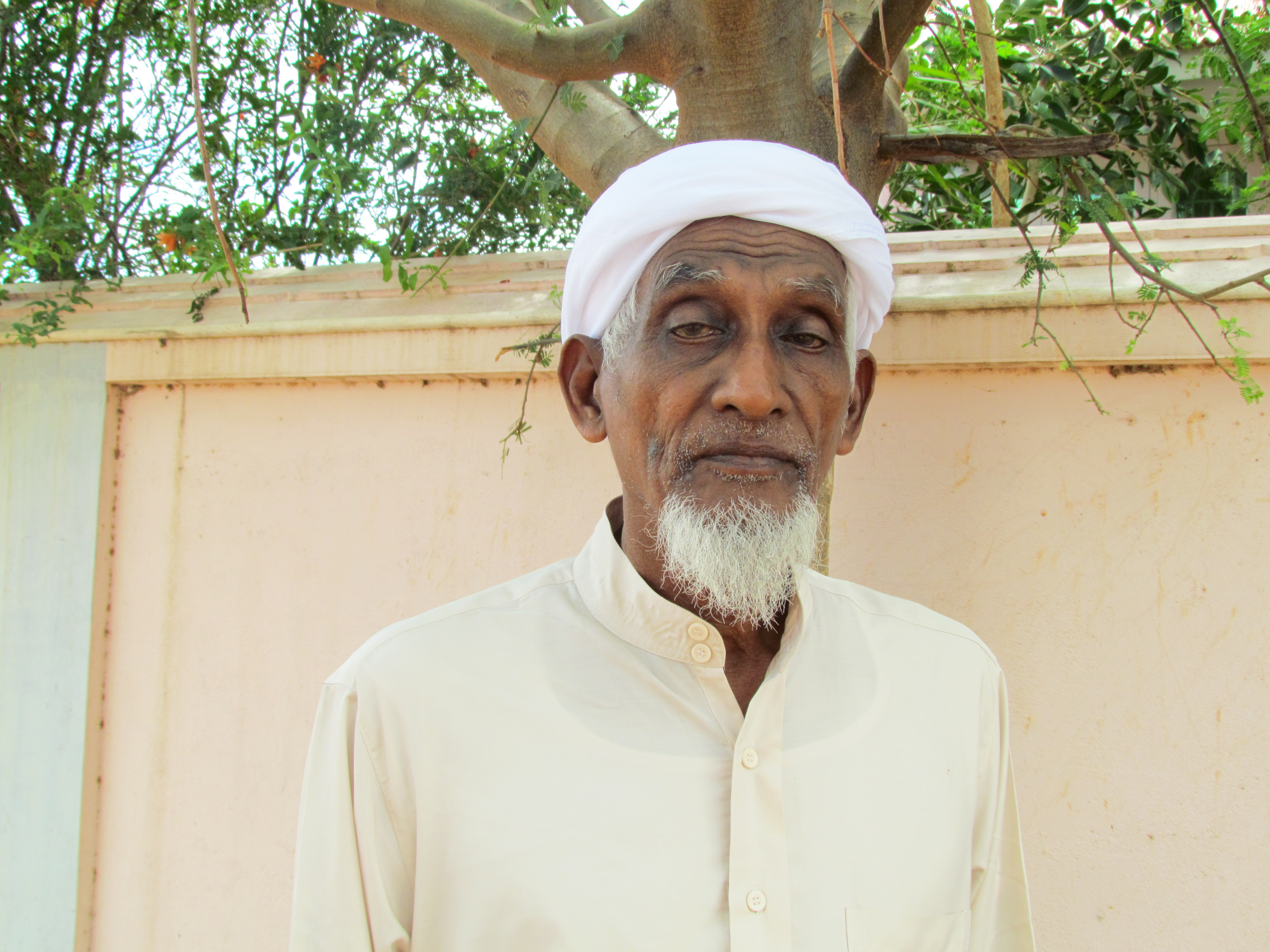
- Born: 16 March 1938 (age 88); Minicoy Island, Lakshadweep, India
- Known for: Abudefduf Manikfani
- Awards: Padma Shri (2021)
- Scientific career
- Fields: Marine biologist; Ecologist; Cosmology; Shipbuilder; Multilingual; Muslim scholar

Muraduganduvar Ali Manikfan (born 16 March 1938, Minicoy Island, Lakshadweep), also known as Muräduganduvar Ali Befanu, is an Indian marine researcher, ecologist, shipbuilder, and polyglot. Manikfan is his family name and befanu is a title.

He is noted for his autodidactic research skills in the marine, ecology, and agricultural fields, not holding any formal educational qualification, and for promoting a life of simplicity. The Government of India honored him in 2021, with the Padma Shri, the fourth highest civilian award in the country.

== Life ==
Ali Manikfan was born to Musa Manikfan and Fatima Manika on Minicoy Island of Lakshadweep on 16 March 1938. His father Musa sent him to Kannur for formal education. As he was not interested in formal education, he left his studies and returned home. According to him, formal education is artificial and pointless and the best way to acquire knowledge is getting wisdom by observing our environment. As a polyglot, Ali Manikfan knows a great number of languages. Besides his mother tongue Divehi (Mahl), he learned English, Hindi, Malayalam, Arabic, Latin, French, Russian, German, Sinhalese, Persian, Sanskrit, Tamil and Urdu. His other areas of interest are marine biology, marine research, geography, astronomy, social science, traditional shipbuilding, education, fisheries, agriculture and horticulture. In 1956 he worked as a teacher and then became a clerk in Minicoy. (Indian government's chief civil official on the Island). However, his interest was in marine life - in the 1960s he joined the Central Marine Fisheries Research Institute of India.

=== New fish species discovered ===
While working with the marine biologist Dr. Santhappan Jones, Manikfan discovered a new fish species. Jones, impressed by Ali's observation skills and his wide knowledge about marine life, called the species Abudefduf manikfani. Later, his knowledge was used for a paper describing the fish species in the Laccadive archipelago found in the specimen collections, on which he was listed as a co-author.

=== Technical and agricultural experiments ===
Ali Manikfan follows non-aggressive agricultural methods that take nature in consideration. For his 15-acre (0.061 km^{2}) land in Valliyur in Thirunelveli district, Tamil Nadu, he produces his own electricity from a windmill which he designed himself. He built a house there with eco friendly materials that are naturally available in the region.

==== Shipbuilder ====
In 1981 Ali Manikfan was given the responsibility of making a reconstruction of an ancient Arab trading ship, the Sohar, by Irish adventurer Tim Severin. He went to Oman to direct a team of carpenters. The ship, named after the city of Sohar in Oman, was completely hand-made, using traditional boatbuilding techniques, and no metal was used in its construction. It took one year to build the 27-metre-long ship, and four tons of coir were needed to sew the planks of its hull, in the same way that ancient Maldivians had built ships. Tim Severin traveled 9,600 km from Oman to China by this ship. Severin described his eight-month-long journey in a book, The Sindbad Voyage. The Sohar is now displayed at a Museum in Oman.

==== Calendar ====
Ali Manikfan has claimed to have designed a lunar calendar based on the new moon times published by Fred Espenak who calculated the new moon times based on the Astronomical Algorithms of Jean Meeus. However the same calendar was used in Saudi Arabia from 1972 to 1999. He recommended Muslims all over the world to follow his lunar calendar.

The Islamic calendar (Hijri calendar) is a purely lunar calendar. It contains 12 months that are based on the visible new moon of every month, and because 12 synodic months is only 12 x 29.53059=354.3671 days, the Islamic calendar is consistently shorter than a tropical year, and therefore it shifts with respect to the solar calendars used in most of the Western or, more generally, Christian, world . The calendar is based on the Qur'an (Sura IX, 36-37) and its proper observance is a sacred duty for Muslims.

According to Ali Manikfan's criterion, which was originally the criterion of Umm Al Qura Calendar of Saudi Arabia, "If the new moon ie. the geocentric conjunction of the sun and moon occurs before 00:00 UT, the following calendrical day is the first day of lunar month". For e.g. New moon of February 2015 occurred on 18th at 23:47UT. So the month of Jumada I of 1436 started from the next calendrical day 19 February, which was 13mins passed new moon. Likewise, New moon of the month of October in the same year happened on 13th at 00:05, So the month of Muharram of the year 1437 started on the next calendrical day 14 October, which was 23hrs 55mins passed new moon. As per Islamic law, the month should be begun after the sighting of Hilal. It will take 20 to 24-hours for Hilal to form. But in his lunar calendar some months start after a few minutes of conjunction and some other months after 23.9hrs of conjunction, which is almost a day. There is no relevance to Hilal in his calendar.

He further claims "There is a day called universal day and conjunction always happens on that day". There is no day called universal day on the planet. No astronomer ever mentioned such a day. And he teaches that last day of the month should be the universal day of conjunction. He considers the 24hrs of UT in which conjunction happens as a universal day, which is the local day at Greenwich. The universal day what he claims is nothing but the local day of Greenwich. His criterion has no logic of except Greenwich midnight. It simply follows the day convention of the Christian calendar and the new moon time referred in Greenwich Mean Time.

Since there is no Hilal involved in his criterion it is widely criticized by the Muslim scholars and astronomers in India.

His calendar is followed by a minority in the State of Tamil Nadu in India, Where He is the Chairman of the Hijra Committee of India

The criterion of the calendar proposed by Ali is not his own. It was an old criterion used in Saudi Arabia for its Ummul Qura calendar.

A calendar with a same criterion is used by a Judeo-Christian ministry Worlds Last Chance. All the ideologies of WLC and Ali Manikfan are same. Both claim that the day starts at the dawn and the next day of the day of conjunction is the first day of lunar month.

==== Bicycle ====
He built a roller-driven motorcycle out of a bicycle with an attached old power sprayer motor. It was started by pedaling until the motor got going. He went with his son Musa from Tamil Nadu to New Delhi, doing an average of 60 to 70 km a day. Though its maximum speed is only 35 km/h, Ali Manikfan claims it's far cheaper and efficient than a petrol-driven two-wheeler.

==== Qibla ====
He claims that "one who crosses the International Date Line should change his Qiblah in the opposite direction". So that people eastward should face east for Qiblah and people westward should face west for Qiblah. Moreover, he insists people on the either sides of the International Date Line to stand backwards to each other and face Qiblah at the opposite directions during prayer. His view is disputed by some Muslim scholars.
