= Investigator Bank =

Submerged atoll in the Indian Ocean

- Location within India

Geography
- Location: Arabian Sea
- Coordinates: 8.5°N 73.28°E
- Type: Submerged bank
- Archipelago: Lakshadweep
- Adjacent to: Indian Ocean
- Total islands: 0
- Area: 0 km^{2} (0 sq mi)
- Highest elevation: −217 m (-712 ft)

Administration
- India
- Territory: Union territory of Lakshadweep
- District: Lakshadweep
- Island group: Minicoy Islands
- Tehsils of India: Minicoy Tehsil
- Subdivisions of India: Minicoy Ward

Demographics
- Population: 0 (2014)
- Pop. density: 0/km^{2} (0/sq mi)
- Ethnic groups: Mahls

Additional information
- Time zone: IST (UTC+5:30)
- ISO code: IN-LD-09
- Official website: www.lakshadweep.gov.in
- Avg. summer temperature: 32.0 °C (89.6 °F)
- Avg. winter temperature: 28.0 °C (82.4 °F)

The Investigator Bank is a submerged bank or sunken atoll in the Union Territory of Lakshadweep, India. It is located 31 km (19 mi) to the northeast of Minicoy Island in Lakshadweep.

== Geography ==
It is located 31 km to the northeast of Minicoy Island in the southern region of the Nine Degree Channel. Its minimum depth is 217 m. Depths in the neighborhood of the bank reach 914 meters. The Investigator Canyon is located north of the Investigator Bank between 17˚45'N, 66˚27'E and 17˚47'N, 66˚10'E. Its lagoon area is 141.8 km^{2} (54.7 sq mi). This bank was named in 1886 after wooden paddle hydrographic survey vessel HMS Investigator.

== Image gallery ==
Map
