= Viringili (Maliku Atoll) =

Uninhabited islet in Lakshadweep, India

Nickname: Small Pox Island
- Location of Villingili Island in Lakshadweep

Geography
- Location: Arabian Sea
- Coordinates: 8.278°N 73.011°E
- Archipelago: Lakshadweep
- Adjacent to: Indian Ocean
- Total islands: 1
- Major islands: Villingili
- Area: 0.025 km^{2} (0.0097 sq mi)
- Length: 0.15 km (0.093 mi)
- Width: 0.20 km (0.124 mi)
- Coastline: 0.8 km (0.5 mi)
- Highest elevation: 0 m (0 ft)

Administration
- India
- Territory: Union territory of Lakshadweep
- District: Lakshadweep
- Island group: Minicoy Islands
- Tehsils of India: Minicoy Tehsil
- Subdivisions of India: Minicoy Ward

Demographics
- Population: 0 (2014)
- Pop. density: 0/km^{2} (0/sq mi)
- Ethnic groups: Malayali, Mahls

Additional information
- Time zone: IST (UTC+5:30)
- PIN: 682559
- Telephone code: 0489x
- ISO code: IN-LD-09
- Official website: www.lakshadweep.gov.in
- Avg. summer temperature: 32.0 °C (89.6 °F)
- Avg. winter temperature: 28.0 °C (82.4 °F)

Villingili is an uninhabited islet in Lakshadweep, India. It is located at the southwestern end of Minicoy's reef, in Maliku Atoll.

== History ==
It is the location where the lepers of Lakshadweep were banished, where they lived in abject conditions.

== Administration ==
The island belongs to the Minicoy township, of Minicoy Tehsil.

== Geography ==
Viringili is barely 200 m in length. It is fringed with gravel and it is covered with bushes. A few stunted coconut trees grow in the center of the island. It has a distance of 0.6 km (0.37 mi) from Minicoy.

== Image gallery ==
Lakshadweep in India

Map

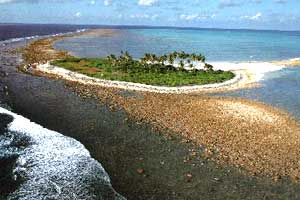
The islet of Viringili.
