= Suheli Par =

Coral atoll in Lakshadweep, India

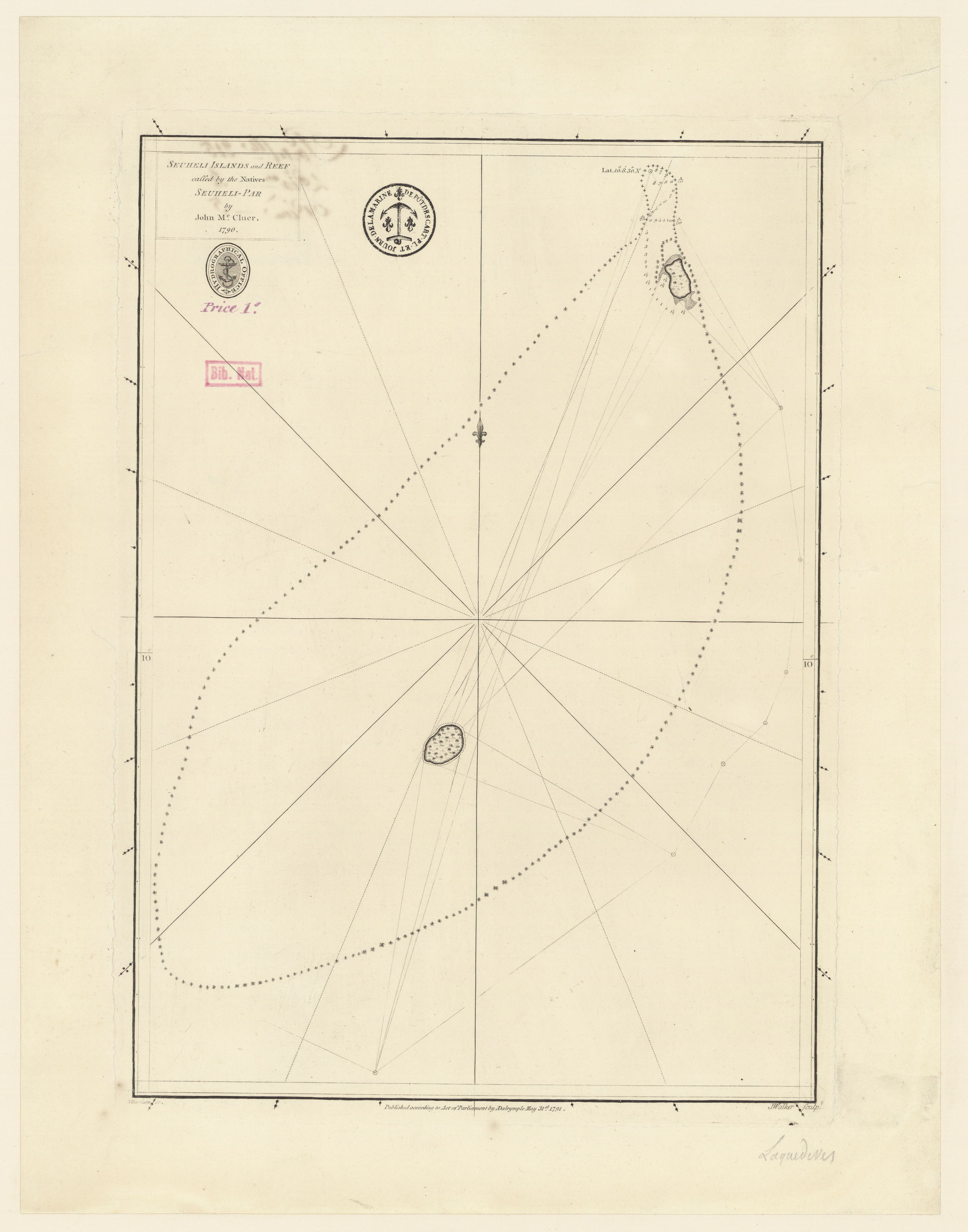
- Map of Suheli Par

- Location within India

Geography
- Location: Arabian Sea
- Coordinates: 10.07°N 72.3°E
- Type: Atoll
- Archipelago: Lakshadweep
- Adjacent to: Indian Ocean
- Total islands: 3
- Major islands: Valiyakara; Cheriyakara; Suheli Pitti
- Area: 0.888 km^{2} (0.343 sq mi)
- Highest elevation: 1 m (3 ft)

Administration
- India
- Territory: Union territory of Lakshadweep
- District: Lakshadweep
- Island group: Laccadive Islands
- Tehsils of India: Kavaratti
- Subdivisions of India: Kavaratti
- Largest settlement: Cheriyakara (pop. 10)

Demographics
- Population: 10 (2014)
- Pop. density: 11/km^{2} (28/sq mi)
- Ethnic groups: Malayali, Mahls

Additional information
- Time zone: IST (UTC+5:30)
- PIN: 682555, 682559, 682557
- Telephone code: 04890, 04895 ,04896
- ISO code: IN-LD-07
- Official website: www.lakshadweep.gov.in
- Literacy: 84.4%
- Avg. summer temperature: 32.0 °C (89.6 °F)
- Avg. winter temperature: 28.0 °C (82.4 °F)
- Sex ratio: ♂/♀

Suheli Par is a coral atoll in the Union Territory of Lakshadweep, India. It is an oval-shaped 17 km long atoll surrounded by a zone of rich marine fauna.

== Geography ==
Suheli Par is located at 10°05′N 72°17′E, 52 km to the SW of Kavaratti, 76 km to the south of Agatti, 139 km to the west of Kalpeni and 205 km to the NNW of Minicoy, with the broad Nine Degree Channel between them. The lagoon area is 87.76 km^{2} (33.88 sq mi).

=== Islands ===
There are three islands on the reef encircling the lagoon.

- Valiyakara Located at the northern end of the lagoon. This island has retained most of its original vegetation. It has also some largely stunted, unkempt coconut trees and is visited occasionally by workers who collect the coconuts. Hermit crabs are found in abundance. There is a lighthouse on this island. Light ARLHS LAK-015. It has a size of 0.395 square kilometres (0.153 square miles).
- Cheriyakara Located on the southeastern side of the lagoon and slightly smaller than Valiyakara. This island has a large coconut plantation. Between mid-October and mid-April, fishermen of Agatti and Kavaratti stay in temporary settlements on this island (average yearly population of 10). They catch tuna in the surrounding waters and process it on the island. Its size is 0.383 square kilometres (0.148 square miles).
- Indira-Shastri Dweep is a long sandbank located between the two islands. It was used as a breeding ground by terns. Its size is 0.11 square kilometres (0.042 square miles).

== Ecology ==
Both islands have coconut trees, as well as Pandanus, Scaevola taccada, Tournefortia argentea and Pemphis acidula bushes. The grey heron and the black-capped kingfisher have been observed in this atoll. Owing to the rich marine life there was a proposal to declare Suheli Par a marine national park.

In 2006 a ship from Seychelles ran aground on this atoll, but there was no oil spill reported.
