= Minicoy =

Island in Lakshadweep, India

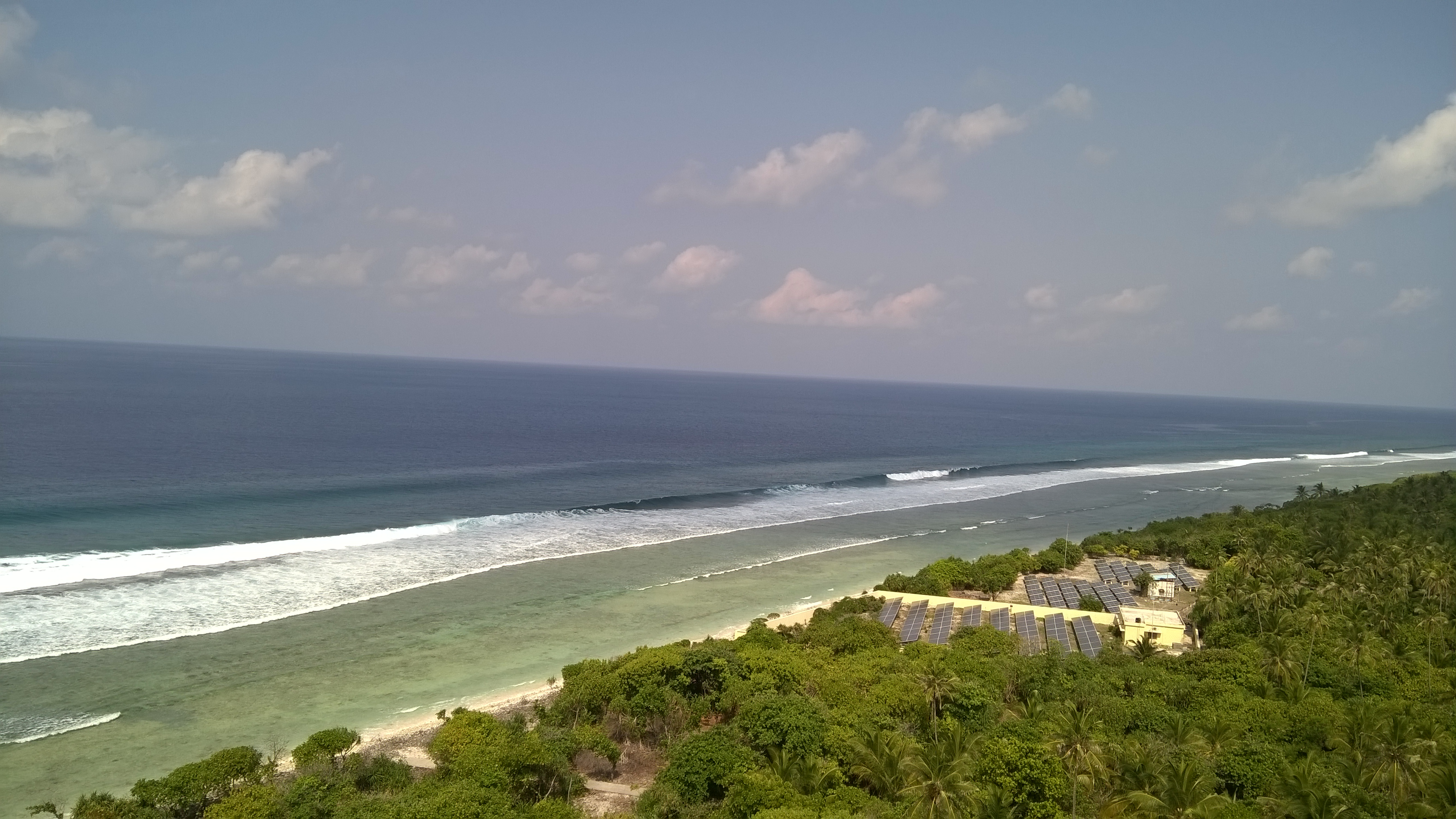

- Location within India Location within Lakshadweep

Geography
- Location: Arabian Sea
- Archipelago: Maldives
- Adjacent to: Indian Ocean
- Area: 4.801 km^{2} (1.854 sq mi)
- Highest elevation: 2 m (7 ft)

Administration
- India
- Territory: Union territory of Lakshadweep
- District: Lakshadweep
- Island group: Minicoy Islands
- Tehsils of India: Minicoy Tehsil
- Subdivisions of India: Minicoy Ward
- Largest settlement: Minicoy Bada (pop. 9000)

Demographics
- Population: 10,700 (2014)
- Pop. density: 2,229/km^{2} (5773/sq mi)
- Ethnic groups: Maldivians, Malayali

Additional information
- Time zone: IST (UTC+5:30)
- PIN: 682559
- Telephone code: 04892
- ISO code: IN-LD-09
- Official website: www.lakshadweep.gov.in
- Literacy: 84.4%
- Avg. summer temperature: 32.0 °C (89.6 °F)
- Avg. winter temperature: 28.0 °C (82.4 °F)

Minicoy, locally known as Maliku, is an island in Lakshadweep, India. Along with Viringili, it is on Maliku atoll, the southernmost atoll of Lakshadweep archipelago. Administratively, it is a census town in the Indian union territory of Lakshadweep. The island is situated 398 km southwest of Kochi and 425 km west of Thiruvananthapuram, the capital city of Kerala.

== Etymology ==
Minicoy is known as Maliku in the local language, Dhivehi, which is also the national and official language of the Republic of Maldives. The language is a descendant of Elu Prakrit and is closely related to the Sinhala language, but not mutually intelligible with it. However, the Lakhshadweep Administration refers to Dhivehi as Mahl. This is due to a misunderstanding on the part of a British civil servant who came to Minicoy in the 1900s during the British Raj. The official asked a local what his language was and he replied "Dhivehi-bas". The official looked confused as he had never heard of this language. Noticing this, the islander said "Mahaldeebu" as he knew that locals on the subcontinent referred to the kingdom to the south (the Maldives) by that name. The civil servant then official recorded the language of Minicoy as Mahl.

The ancient name of Maliku was Mahiladū meaning women's island. Mahiladū derives from Elu Prakrit term Mahila du, which literally means woman-island. However, the name Maliku is thought to have been derived from the Arab trader's term for the island, Jazirat al-Maliku ('the island of the king').

Minicoy islanders have long settled in the Nicobar Islands across the Bay of Bengal. These settlers regularly travelled back to Minicoy. The Andaman and Nicobar Islands had a reputation in the Maldives and Minicoy of being inhabited by cannibals, and so collectively the Andaman and Nicobar groups were called "Minikaa-raajje" ("cannibal kingdom") by Minicoy and Maldive islanders.

A British official once asked a Minicoy islander what the name of his island was. The islander told the official that he was from Maliku but usually lived in "Minikaa-raajje" (Nicobar). The official thought Maliku and Minikaa were the same place and recorded the name of this islander's home as "Minikaa". This later became anglicised as Minicoy.

== Geography ==
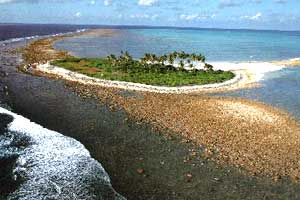
The islet of Viringili located at the southwestern end of Minicoy's reef, where lepers were formerly banished.

Minicoy is the second largest and the southernmost among the islands of the Lakshadweep archipelago. It is located 201 km to the south-southwest of Kalpeni, at the southern end of the Nine Degree Channel and 125 km to the north of Thuraakunu, Maldives, at the northern end of the Eight Degree Channel. The atoll is 10 km in length, having a maximum breadth of about 6 km. The closest geographic feature is the Investigator Bank, a submerged shoal located 31 km to the northeast.

It is located 400 km west off the coast of Trivandrum. The atoll contains two islands. The main island is located on the eastern and southeastern side of the lagoon, along the reef fringe. It measures about 10 km from its northern end to its southernmost point and it is about 1 km wide in its southern half, while the northern half is a narrow sandspit, often less than 100 m wide. Minicoy is almost completely covered with coconut trees. One of the few landmarks of the island is the Minicoy Island Lighthouse, which was built in 1885 during the British regime. On the southern side of the main island lies the uninhabited islet of Viringili (Dhivehi: ވިރިންގިލި; Malayalam: വിരിന്ഗാ, also called the Small Pox Island), measuring barely 200 m in length. Formerly the lepers of Minicoy were banished to this island where they lived in abject conditions.

Maliku Atoll has a lagoon with two entrances in its northern side, Saalu Magu on the northeast and Kandimma Magu on the northwest. Its western side is fringed by a narrow reef and coral rocks awash. The interior of the lagoon is sandy and of moderate depth, rarely reaching 4 m. It has some coral patches.

This atoll is administered under the Indian Union Territory of Lakshadweep. Nine Degree Channel separates Minicoy and the Laccadive Islands. The closest island to Minicoy is Thuraakunu in the Republic of the Maldives. Since 1956, the Indian Government has forbidden the direct travelling between the two islands despite their geographic proximity and ethnographic similarities.

Maliku Kandu is the traditional name of the broad channel between Minicoy (Maliku) and Ihavandippulhu (Haa Alif Atoll) in the Maldives. In the Admiralty Charts it is called Eight Degree Channel. Other names for this channel are Addigiri Kandu and Māmalē Kandu. It appears in the old French maps with the name Courant de Malicut.

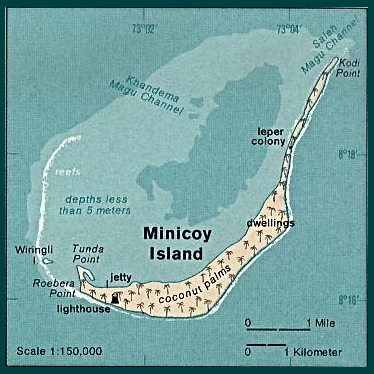
Map of Minicoy Atoll (Maliku)

=== Villages ===
There are total of eleven villages (athiris, avah) on Minicoy Island. From north to south, they are:

1. Kendiparty
2. Pallessery
3. Kudehi
4. Funhilol
5. Aloodi
6. Sadivalu
7. New Boduathiri
8. Rammedu
9. Boduathiri
10. Aoumagu
11. Bada

== Climate ==
Minicoy has a tropical savanna climate (Köppen climate classification Aw) with warm temperatures throughout the year. Precipitation falls during most of the year; only January to March are relatively dry.

Climate data for Minicoy (1991–2020, extremes 1901–2020)
Month	Jan	Feb	Mar	Apr	May	Jun	Jul	Aug	Sep	Oct	Nov	Dec	Year
Record high °C (°F)	32.9 (91.2)	33.8 (92.8)	34.6 (94.3)	35.6 (96.1)	36.7 (98.1)	34.5 (94.1)	33.6 (92.5)	33.4 (92.1)	33.2 (91.8)	33.3 (91.9)	33.2 (91.8)	33.3 (91.9)	36.7 (98.1)
Mean daily maximum °C (°F)	31.3 (88.3)	31.7 (89.1)	32.6 (90.7)	33.3 (91.9)	32.9 (91.2)	31.5 (88.7)	31.0 (87.8)	31.1 (88.0)	31.1 (88.0)	31.2 (88.2)	31.2 (88.2)	31.3 (88.3)	31.7 (89.1)
Daily mean °C (°F)	27.8 (82.0)	28.2 (82.8)	29.2 (84.6)	30.1 (86.2)	29.8 (85.6)	28.6 (83.5)	28.2 (82.8)	28.3 (82.9)	28.3 (82.9)	28.2 (82.8)	28.1 (82.6)	28.1 (82.6)	28.6 (83.4)
Mean daily minimum °C (°F)	24.3 (75.7)	24.7 (76.5)	25.7 (78.3)	26.8 (80.2)	26.8 (80.2)	25.8 (78.4)	25.4 (77.7)	25.5 (77.9)	25.5 (77.9)	25.2 (77.4)	25.0 (77.0)	24.7 (76.5)	25.4 (77.7)
Record low °C (°F)	17.8 (64.0)	17.2 (63.0)	19.1 (66.4)	20.7 (69.3)	19.7 (67.5)	20.4 (68.7)	19.7 (67.5)	19.7 (67.5)	20.3 (68.5)	19.4 (66.9)	17.2 (63.0)	16.7 (62.1)	16.7 (62.1)
Average rainfall mm (inches)	35.9 (1.41)	20.9 (0.82)	24.2 (0.95)	52.6 (2.07)	163.3 (6.43)	291.3 (11.47)	260.6 (10.26)	208.8 (8.22)	162.6 (6.40)	172.6 (6.80)	143.1 (5.63)	98.7 (3.89)	1,634.7 (64.36)
Average rainy days	2.1	1.2	1.6	3.2	9.3	16.2	14.9	11.9	10.6	10.1	7.9	4.4	93.5
Average relative humidity (%) (at 17:30 IST)	72	71	71	72	76	81	81	80	79	79	78	75	76
Mean monthly sunshine hours	269.7	248.6	272.8	261.0	217.0	138.0	151.9	192.2	195.0	229.4	219.0	260.4	2,655
Mean daily sunshine hours	8.7	8.8	8.8	8.7	7.0	4.6	4.9	6.2	6.5	7.4	7.3	8.4	7.3
Source 1: India Meteorological Department (sun, 1971–2000)
Source 2: Tokyo Climate Center (mean temperatures 1991–2020)

== History ==
=== Pre-colonial era ===
The ancestors of the modern Divēhi-speaking inhabitants probably arrived in Minicoy around the early centuries CE. There are remains in an area of the island known as "Salliballu" dating back from Minicoy's Buddhist past, about 800 years ago. The most conspicuous archaeological sites are two mounds or large heaps of ruins belonging to a stupa and another related structure. These sites were investigated by the Archaeological Survey of India in the 1980s. The excavations yielded few discoveries, for the sites had been much damaged and vandalized previously. Still, a much-damaged large Buddha head was found buried in the area. The name "Salliballu" originated in the local name for the "Christian cross", because the locals say that an inscription with a "cross" was found there. But it is likely that, coming from a Buddhist site, it was a cross-shaped mandala or visvavajra, like those often found on inscriptions in archaeological remains in the Maldives.

Local oral tradition has it that Kamborani and Kohoratukamana, two princesses from the Maldives, came to Maliku. When they arrived, the Tivaru, who had been living there before, left the island for Sri Lanka. The Kamborani's descendants are the bodun (land and shipowners) and the descendants of Kohoratukamana are the niamin (captains). The other status groups are made up of the descendants of their crew.

Islam spread to Minicoy around the 12th century and Minicoy remained culturally and politically part of the Maldives until the 16th century.

=== Colonial era ===
==== Under suzerainty of East India Company ====
Until the 16th century, the Laccadives was under the suzerainty of the Kolathiri Raja of Chirakkal in what is now the Indian state of Kerala. With the Portuguese ascendancy in the region, it became necessary for the Kolathiri to transfer sovereignty of the islands to their hereditary admiral, the Ali Raja of Kolathunadu (Cannanore).

However, the kings and queens of the Maldives also issued edicts addressed to the subjects in their realm Malikaddu Midhemedhu. This meant "Between Maliku (Minicoy) and Addu". Previously Addu was the southernmost island in the dominions of the Maldive kings and was in Addu Atoll. A 1696 CE grant issued under the Seal of the King Siri Kula Ran Mani (Sultan Mohamed IV) of the Maldives, regarding the building and upkeep of a mosque in Finey at Thiladhummathi Atoll in Maldives, referred to him as Malikaddu Midhemedhu ekanuonna mi korhu anikaneh nethee korhu which meant "Sole Sovereign with no other over what lies between Maliku (Minicoy) and Addu".

==== Under direct rule of British India ====
In 1857, suzerainty over Minicoy transferred from the East India Company to the Indian Empire when Queen Victoria was proclaimed Empress. On 18 December 1790 Maliku was surrendered to the Court of Directors of the British East India Company by the Ali Raja Cannanore, Junumabe Ali-Adi Raja Bibi II. The Ali Raja was allowed to administer Maliku in return for a tribute to the East India Company. She continued to dispute the transfer of sovereignty but in 1824, her successor, Mariambe Ali-Adi Raja Bibi made a formal written recognition of the suzerainty of the East India Company over Maliku (Minicoy). She and her successors, however, continued the tributary arrangement. On 27 July 1795, the Governor General of the Presidency of Madras under whose jurisdiction Minicoy was, abolished Junumabe Ali Adi-Raja Bibi's monopoly over coir trade. In 1905 under the heavy burden of debts to the Empire, Mohamed Ali-Adi Raja of Cannanore agreed to surrender sovereignty and control over Minicoy. He died before the formal transfer. After an attempt to backtrack, his successor Imbicchi Ali-Adi Raja Bibi finally signed over Minicoy to the Emperor Edward VII on 9 February 1909, backdated to 1 July 1905. Following this, Minicoy was annexed to the District of Malabar.

=== After independence of India ===
==== 1956 plebiscite and integration with India ====
After the independence of India in August 1947, the possessions of the Emperor of India passed to either the Indian Union or Pakistan according to an agreed demarcation line. The rulers of the princely state of British India had the choice of acceding to either India or Pakistan. Since Minicoy was earlier in a sovereign possession of the British Raj, India held a plebiscite in Minicoy in 1956 to determine whether or not the people of Minicoy wished to join the Indian Union. A referendum was held and an absolute majority of the Minicoy decided to join the Indian Union.

==== Union Territory of India ====
After the plebiscite, on 1 November 1956, Minicoy was incorporated into the Union Territory of Laccadive, Minicoy, and Aminidivi Islands, renamed Lakshadweep in 1973. At this time, the Maldives was still not independent from the British.

=== India-Maldives maritime treaty ===
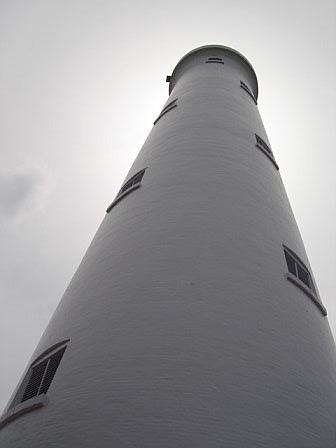
Worm's-eye view of the Lighthouse in Minicoy island

In December 1976, India and the Maldives signed a maritime boundary treaty whereby Minicoy was placed on the Indian side of the boundary. India and Maldives officially and amicably decided their maritime boundary in 1976, in 1982 when the brother of the President of Maldives Maumoon Abdul Gayoom, Abdulla Hameed declared that the neighbouring Minicoy Island that belonged to India were a part of Maldives; Maldives quickly and officially denied that it was laying claim to the island.

India and Maldives continue to enjoy friendly relations and a strategic partnership in economic and military fields. India continues to contribute to the security of the island nation of Maldives.

== Demographics ==
Religion in Minicoy Island (2011)
1. Islam (96.6%)
2. Hinduism (2.50%)
3. Christianity (0.78%)
4. Others (0.10%)
5. Not Stated (0.04%)

As of 2011 India census, the island of Minicoy had a population of 10,447. Males constitute 51% of the population and females 49%. Minicoy has an average literacy rate of 83.93%, higher than the national average of 74.04%: male literacy is 85.82%, and female literacy is 81.93%. In Minicoy, 9.6% of the population is under 6 years of age.

The majority of the population are Sunni Muslims of the S̲h̲āfiʿī school.

== Transportation ==
=== Sea ===
Nine passenger ships connect Lakshadweep with Kerala, taking 14 to 20 hours.

=== Air ===
Agatti Airport is the only civilian airport in Lakshadweep. Helicopter transfer is available from Agatti to Minicoy throughout the year. The flight from Cochin to Agatti takes approximately one hour thirty minutes. Flights operate six days a week.

On 18 July 2024, the Government of India had cleared the proposal to develop an airport at Minicoy Island as a tri-service military base with a civilian air enclave. The airbase will be capable of operating fighter jets, long-range UAVs and military transport aircraft along with commercial flights. The airbase will be located near the recently commissioned naval base, INS Jatayu. The project is led by the Indian Air Force and will be used by all the branches of the Armed Forces and the Indian Coast Guard.

== Notable people ==
- Ali Manikfan, born 1938

== See also ==
- INS Jatayu
- Tivaru

== Image gallery ==
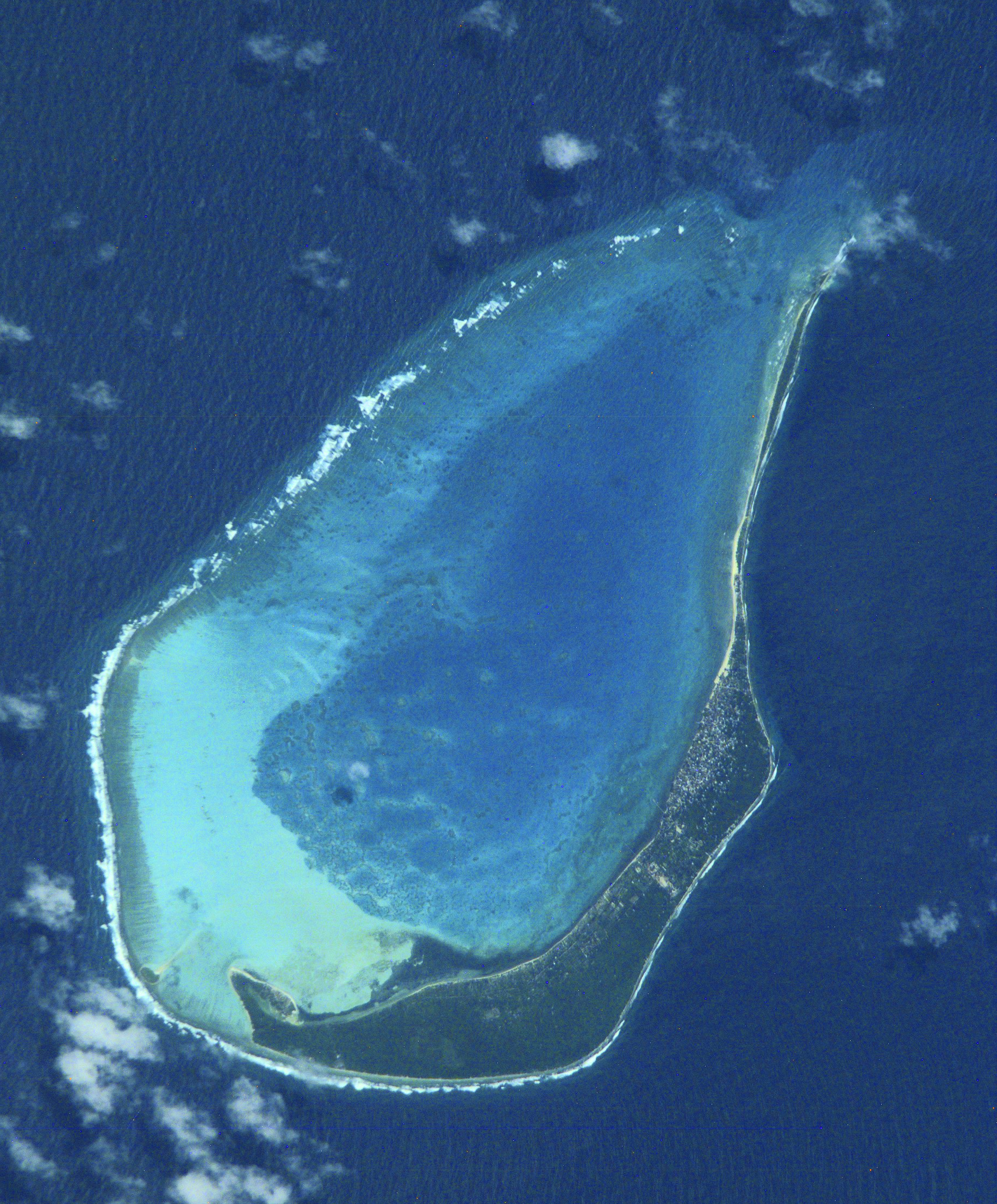
Satellite picture of Minicoy

Map

== Bibliography ==
- Bell, H.C.P.: The Maldive Islands, An account of the physical features, History, Inhabitants, Productions and Trade. Colombo 1883.
- Ellis, R.H.: A Short Account of the Laccadive Islands and Minicoy. Government Press, Madras, 1924.
- Kattner, Ellen: The Social Structure of Maliku (Minicoy). In: International Institute of Asian Studies (IIAS) Newsletter. Nr. 10, 1996, S. 19–20. (Online at http://www.maldivesroyalfamily.com/minicoy_kattner.shtml).
- Kattner, Ellen: Bodu Valu – Big Ponds: Traditional Water Management and its socio-cosmic Implications in Minicoy/Maliku, an Indian Ocean island. In: Ohlig, Christoph (ed.) Antike Zisternen. Publikationen der Deutschen Wasserhistorischen Gesellschaft, 9. Norderstedt: Books on Demand GmbH, 2007, pp. 145–172.
- Xavier Romero-Frias, The Maldive Islanders, A Study of the Popular Culture of an Ancient Ocean Kingdom. Barcelona 1999, ISBN 84-7254-801-5
- Divehi Tārīkhah Au Alikameh. Divehi Bahāi Tārikhah Khidmaiykurā Qaumī Markazu. Reprint 1958 edn. Male' 1990.
- Divehiraajjege Jōgrafīge Vanavaru. Muhammadu Ibrahim Lutfee. G.Sōsanī.
- "The Encyclopaedia of Islam", new edition, Index Volume, Fascicule 2, Glossary and Index of Terms, Bill, 2006, LARGE book-size paperback, 592 pages, ISBN 978-90-04-15610-4.
- Das, Nrupal: Minicoy Island: Beaches, Culture and People of Minicoy, Lakshadweep Islands. 2018, Kindle, 37 Pages (Available Online – Minicoy, Lakshadwweep Islands)
