= Maliku Kandu =

Coordinates: 8°00′00″N 73°00′00″E

Location of Maliku Kandu

Maliku Kandu and Māmalē Kandu Divehi are the traditional names of the broad Minicoy Channel between Minicoy (Maliku in Dhivehi) and Ihavandippolhu (Northern Thiladhunmathi Atoll) in the north of the Maldives. The latter name is given after the Malabar merchant Maamaley Marakkaaru who controlled most of the sea trade along this route before the arrival of the Portuguese in the Indian Ocean. The maritime boundary between the Maldives and India runs through the channel.

In the British Admiralty charts it is called Eight Degree Channel. It is so named as it lies on the 8-degree line of Latitude, north of the equator. Another local name for this channel is Addigiri Kandu.

This channel appeared in old French maps with the name Courant de Malicut.

== History ==
Traditionally the northernmost atoll of the Maldives was Minicoy (Maliku). Fishermen from Thuraakunu and from Minicoy often crossed the Maliku Kandu on their boats to visit each other's islands. Marriage alliances were common.

Nowadays Minicoy is a part of India and communication between Minicoy and Maldives by sea is highly restricted.
