= Nine Degree Channel =

Channel in the Indian Ocean

Coordinates: 9°N 73°E

The Nine Degree Channel is a channel in the Indian Ocean between the Laccadive Islands of Kalpeni and Suheli Par, and Maliku Atoll (Minicoy Island). These two subgroups of islands, together with the Amindivi Subgroup, form the Indian Union Territory (UT) of Lakshadweep.

The Channel is approximately 200 km wide with a depth of 2597 metres. The Investigator Bank is located in the southern region of the channel.

It is so named as it lies on the 9-degree line of Latitude, north of the equator.

== Sea Lane of Strategic Importance ==
The 200 kilometres of the Nine Degree Channel separating Kalpeni and Suheli Par from Minicoy sees the passage of nearly all merchant shipping between Europe, the Middle-East and Western Asia with South-East Asia and the Far-East.

== See also ==
Geostrategic context

- Andaman Sea
- Bay of Bengal
- Arabian Sea
- Exclusive economic zone of India
