= Kalpeni =

Inhabited atoll in Lakshadweep, India

Kalpeni Atoll
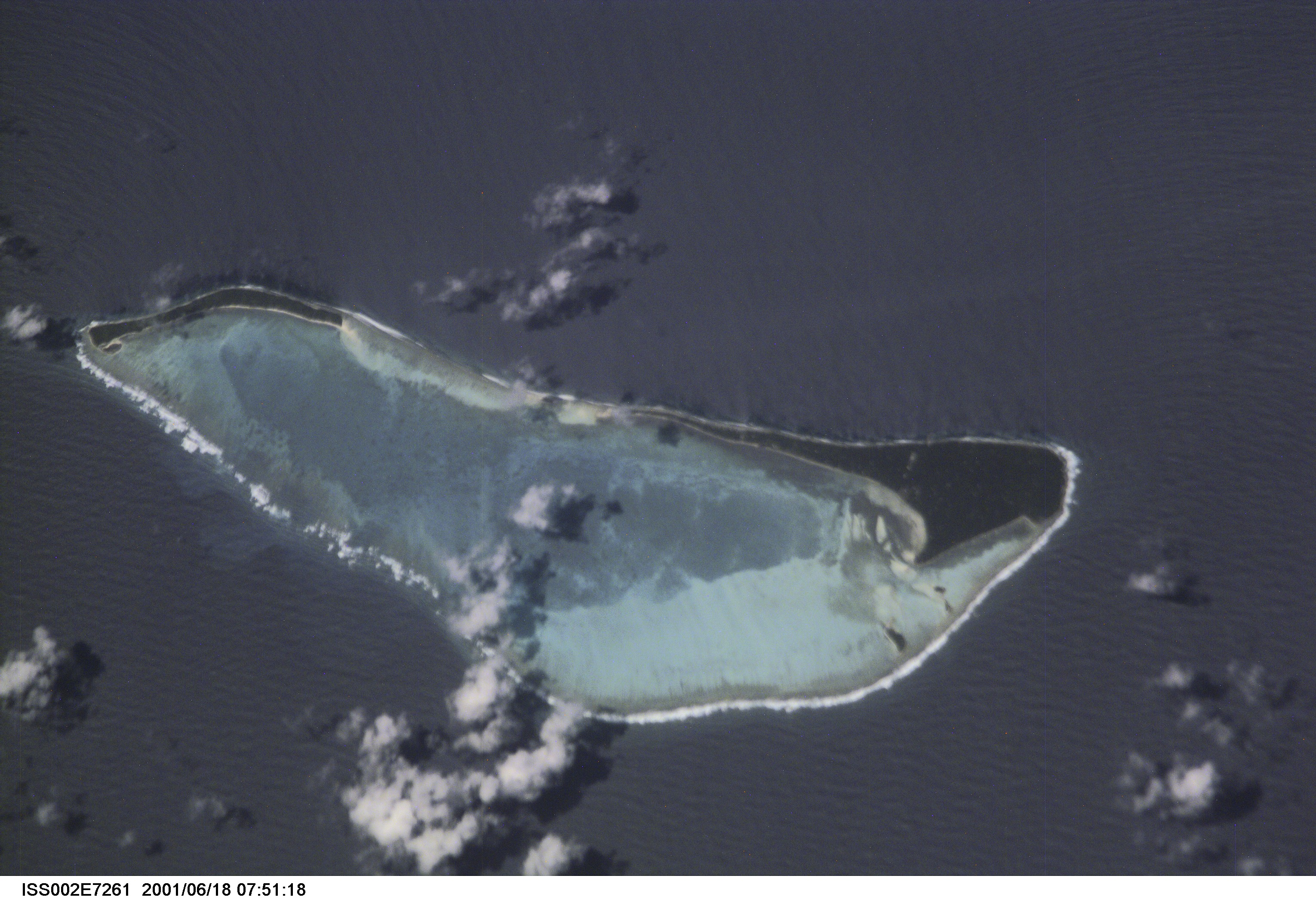
- Kalpeni with Cheriyam to the left

- Location within India

Geography
- Location: Arabian Sea
- Coordinates: 10.09°N 73.64°E
- Type: Atoll
- Archipelago: Lakshadweep
- Adjacent to: Indian Ocean
- Total islands: 7
- Major islands: Kalpeni; Cheriyam; Tilakkam; Kodithala; Pitti
- Area: 3.084 km^{2} (1.191 sq mi)
- Highest elevation: 0 m (0 ft)

Administration
- India
- Territory: Union territory of Lakshadweep
- District: Lakshadweep
- Island group: Laccadive Islands
- Tehsils of India: Andrott
- Subdivisions of India: Kalpeni
- Largest settlement: Kalpeni (pop. 4500)

Demographics
- Population: 4526 (2014)
- Pop. density: 1,467/km^{2} (3800/sq mi)
- Ethnic groups: Malayali, Mahls

Additional information
- Time zone: IST (UTC+5:30)
- PIN: 682557
- Telephone code: 04895
- ISO code: IN-LD-07
- Official website: www.lakshadweep.gov.in
- Literacy: 84.4%
- Avg. summer temperature: 32.0 °C (89.6 °F)
- Avg. winter temperature: 28.0 °C (82.4 °F)
- Sex ratio: 1.122♂/♀

Kalpeni is an inhabited atoll in the Union Territory of Lakshadweep, India. It has a distance of 287 km (178 mi) west of the city of Kochi.

== Geography ==
Kalpeni is 218 kilometres (135 miles) west from the port of Kochi and lies 71 kilometres (44 miles) south of Andrott and 201 kilometres (125 miles) to the NNE of Minicoy, with the broad Nine Degree Channel between them. Suheli Par atoll lies 139 kilometres (86 miles) to the west of Kalpeni.

Kalpeni forms a single coral atoll along with the uninhabited islands of Cheriyam, Tilakkam, Kodithala and Pitti islet.

The eastern and southern shorelines of the island have accumulations of coral debris, the result of a violent storm that hit the area in 1847. It has a lagoon area of 25.6 km^{2} (9.9 sq mi).

=== List of Islands ===
- Kalpeni is the main island. It has an area of 2.482 square kilometres (0.958 square miles), and is located at 10.076°N 73.646°E.
- Kodithala is immediately to the north of Kalpeni, with an area of 0.0027 square kilometres (0.0010 square miles).
- Cheriyam is the northernmost island, with a population of 10. The island has a water tank, a pond, a small 2.8-kilometre (1.7-mile) road from the village to a lighthouse at the north point, constructed by MGNREGS at 2015. It has an area of 0.537 square kilometres (0.207 square miles), and is located at 10.142°N 73.664°E. It is the largest of Kalpeni's satellite islands. The land in Cheriyam belongs to 49 families living in Kalpeni.
  MGNREGS is currently making an economic development on the island to accommodate a new village and resort like on Sentosa. It would impact the economic growth of Kalpeni Island.
- Tilakkam group is a group of islands off the west of Kalpeni. The land of these islands has 0.055 square kilometres (0.021 square miles) and belongs to two different families of Kalpeni:
  - Koomel is a small islet off the west tip of Kalpeni. It has an area of 0.2 hectares (0.49 acres), and is located at 10.073°N 73.635°E.
  - Tilakkam east has an area of 0.88 hectares (2.2 acres), and is located at 10.069°N 73.633°E.
  - Tilakkam west has an area of 0.82 hectares (2.0 acres), and is located at 10.069°N 73.631°E.
  - Pitti islet has an area of 3.6 hectares (8.9 acres), and is located at 10.074°N 73.628°E.

== Demographics ==
Kalpeni was the first island in the Union Territory where girls were allowed to go to school and get an education.

== Administration ==
The island belongs to the township of Kalpeni of Andrott Tehsil.

== Tourism ==
Kalpeni has a beach at the northern tip of the island called Tip Beach where one can do snorkeling, sea bath and kayaking. Because of the coral reefs present in the sea near the beach, the water is shallow and calm, making it an excellent spot for beach activities.

There is a 37-metre-high (121 ft) lighthouse in Kalpeni from whose top one can see a bird's eye view of the island, the lagoon with the smaller islands, the reef and the surrounding ocean. From the top of the lighthouse, one can visualize the abundance of coconut trees, and the ground is not visible due to dense packing of the tops of these trees.

== Image gallery ==
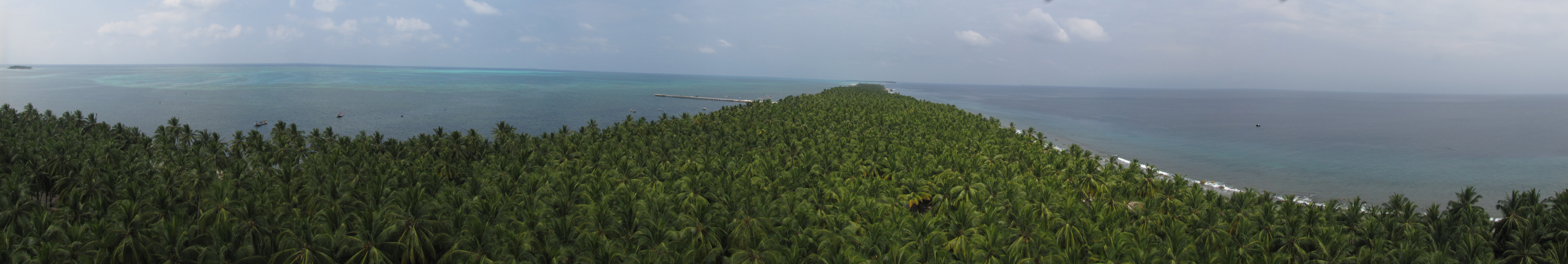
Island's panoramic view from lighthouse

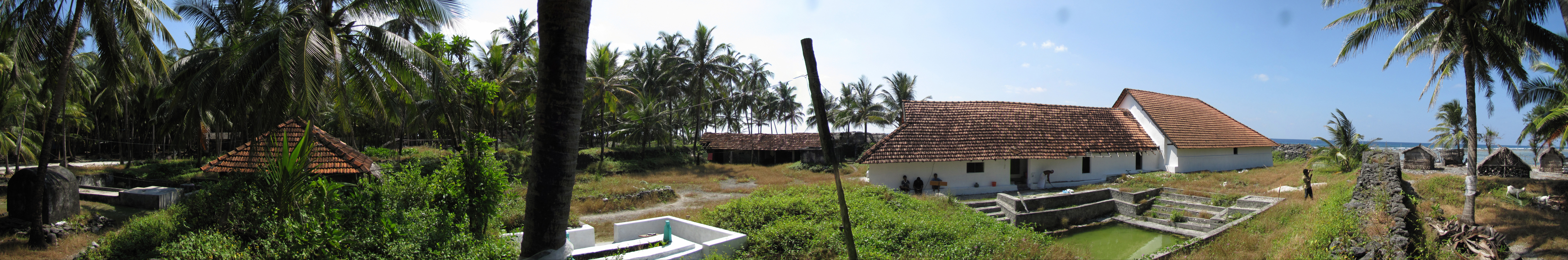
Moideen Mosque – a panoramic view

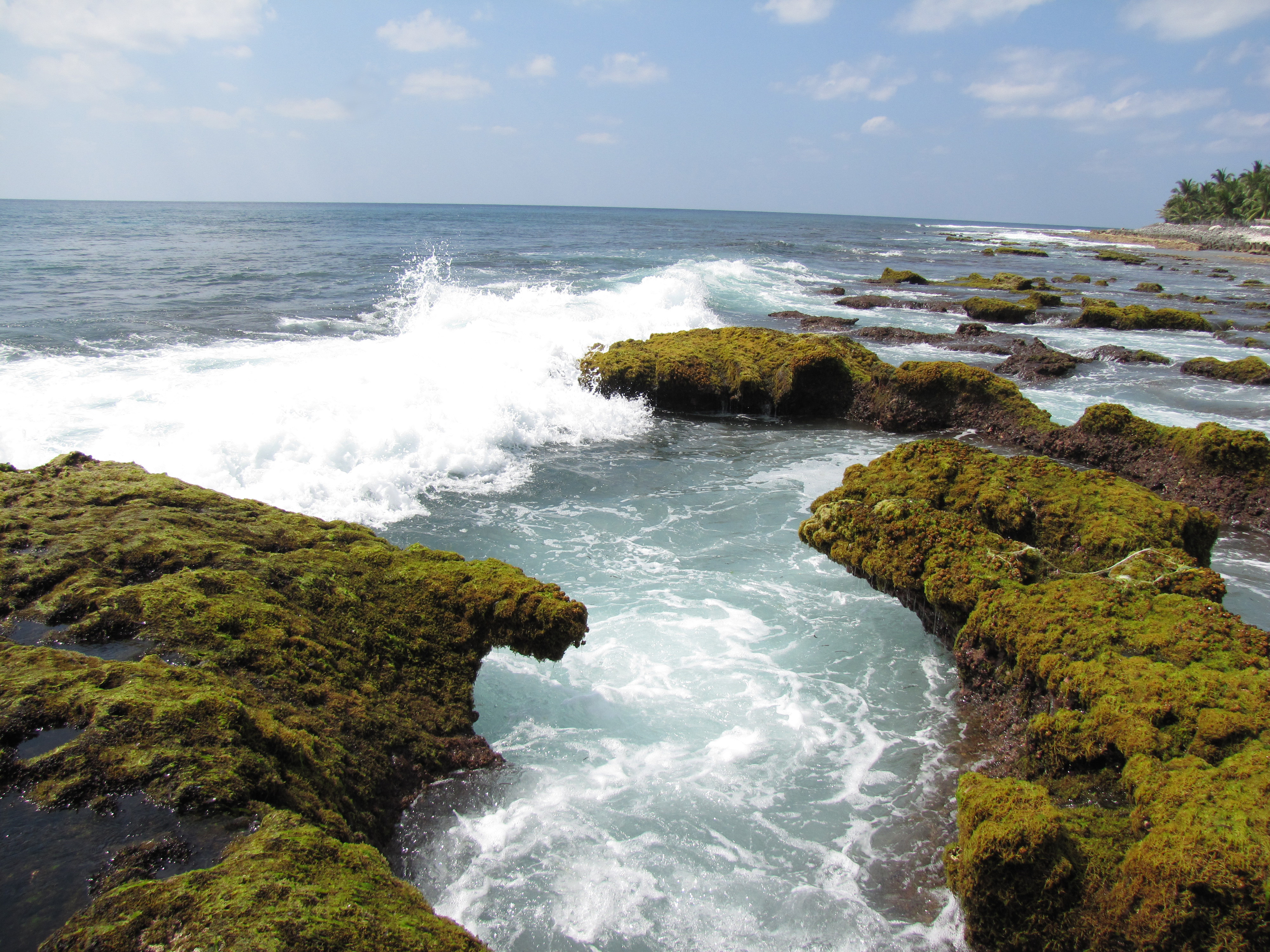
A deep whirlpool in the Agatthiyatti Stone area

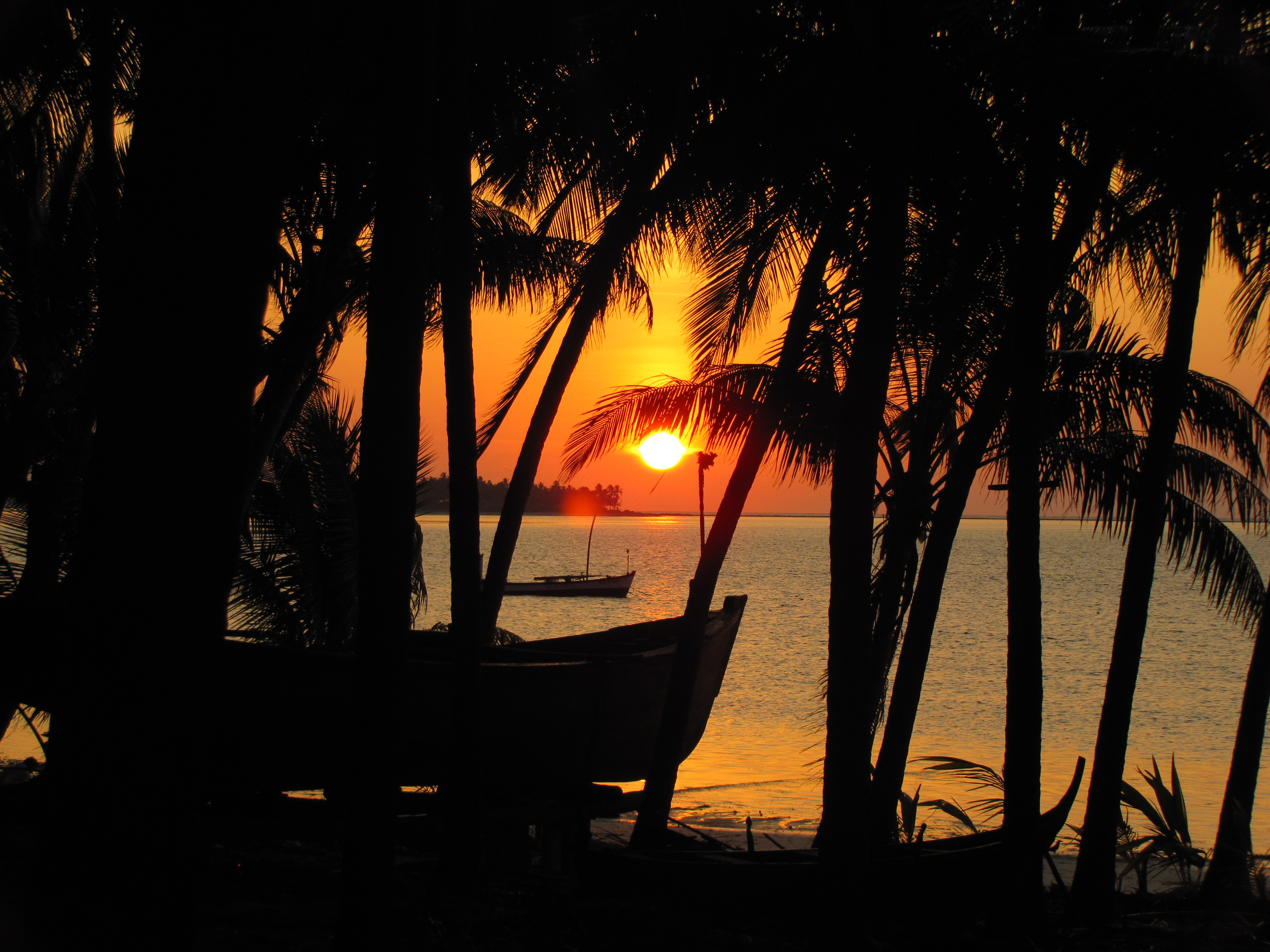
Sunset at Kalpeni

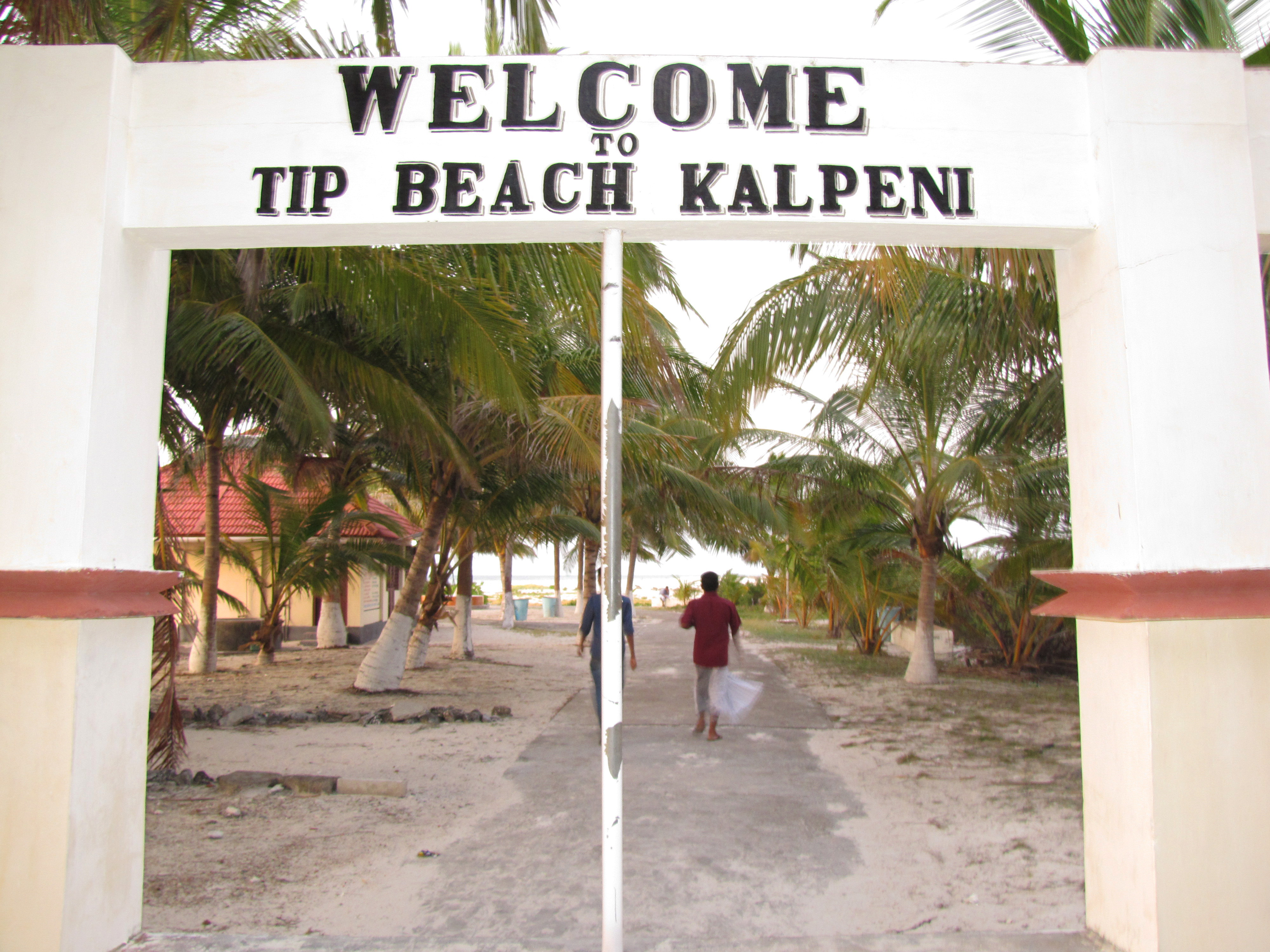
Tip Beach entrance at Kalpeni

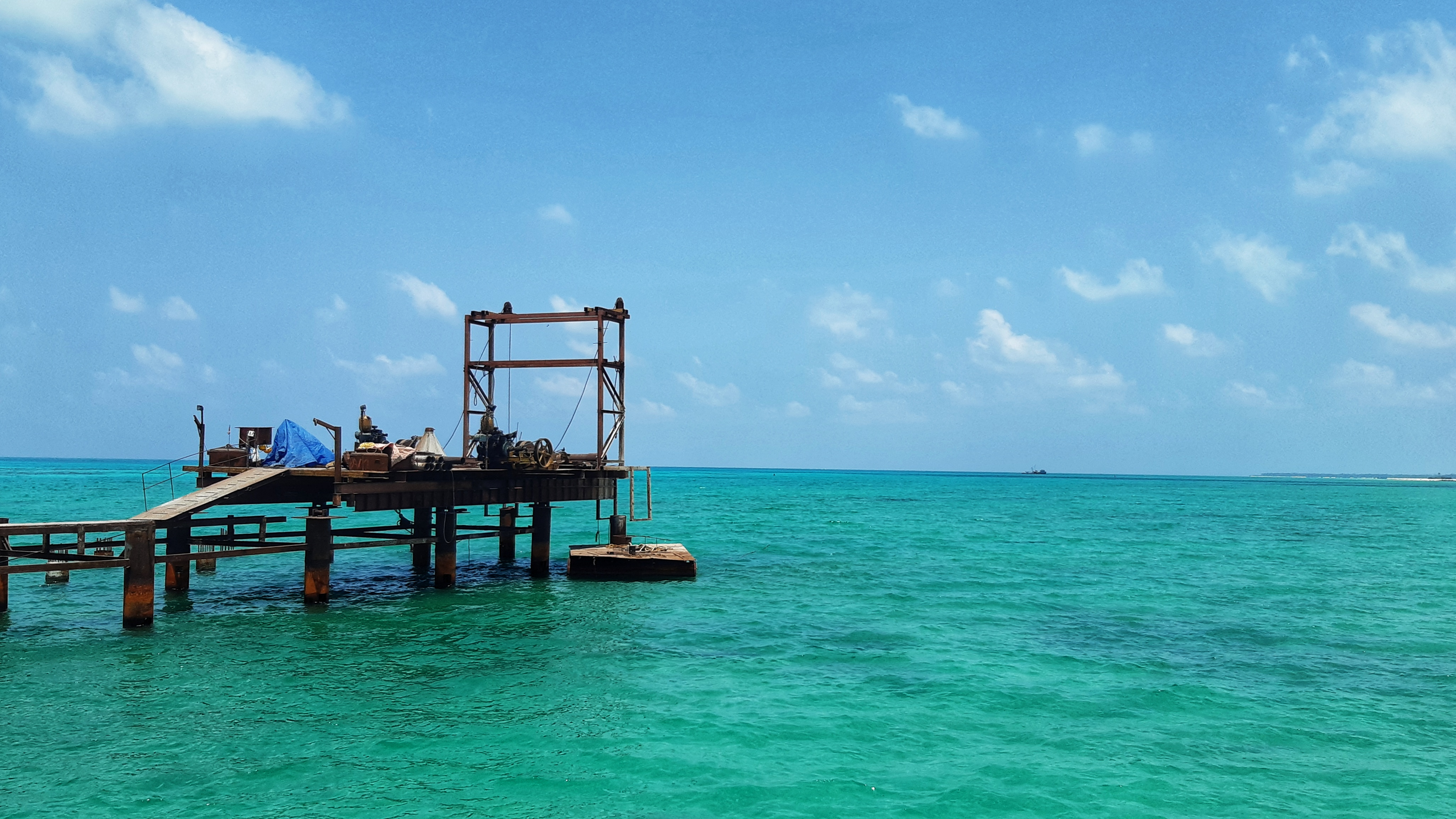
Boat jeti at Kalpeni atoll of Lakshadweep

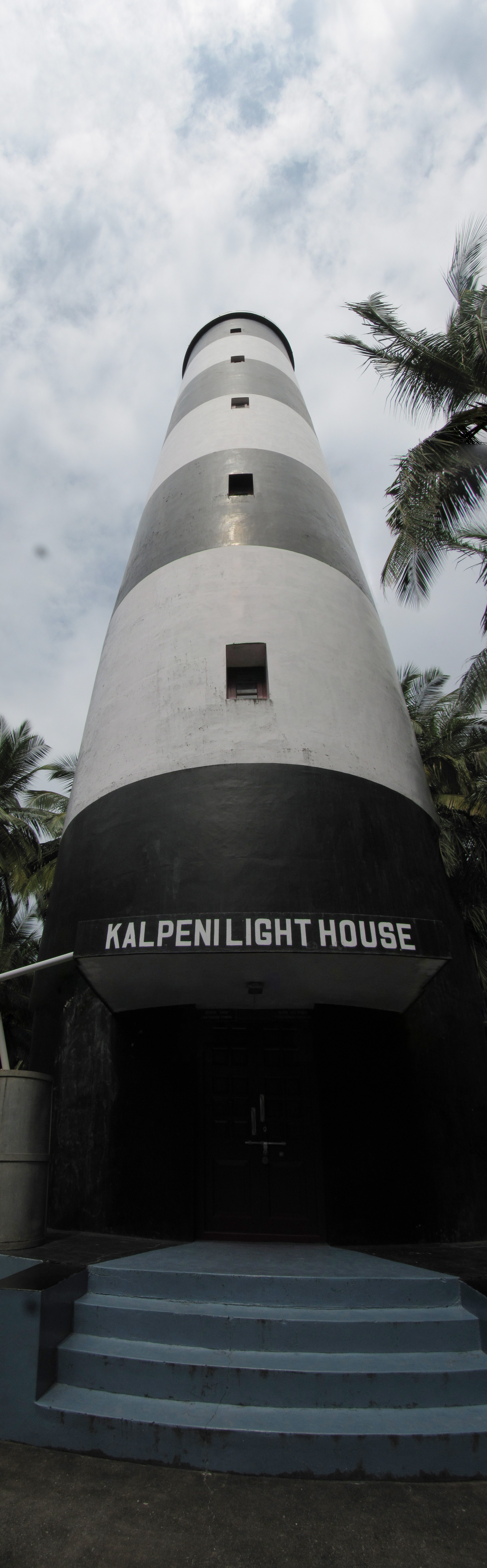
Lighthouse
