= Andenes (disambiguation) =

Andenes is a village in Andøy Municipality in Nordland county, Norway.

Andenes may also refer to:

== Places ==
- Andenes Municipality, a former municipality in Nordland county, Norway
- Andenes Church, a church in the village of Andenes, Norway
- Andenes Lighthouse, a lighthouse in the village of Andenes, Norway
- Andenes Knoll, a knoll in the Weddell Sea (part of the Southern Ocean)

== Other uses ==
- Andén (pl. andenes), a pre-Columbian agricultural terrace
- K.V. Andenes, a Norwegian vessel

== See also ==
- Ardennes, region in Europe
- Andén (disambiguation)
