= Explora =

Explora can refer to:

- Ici Explora, Canadian French-language television channel
- Explora (Albuquerque, New Mexico), science center in Albuquerque, New Mexico, USA
- Parque Explora, science museum in Medellín, Colombia
- Explora-Museum, science museum in Frankfurt am Main, Germany
- Explora Phones Inc, New York-based telecommunications company
- Explora Journeys, cruise brand
- Explora Petroleum, Norwegian oil company
- Explora Knoll, undersea knoll in the Antarctic
- Explora (magazine), Italian monthly magazine
- Explora (comics), series of comics published by Glénat since 2012
- Explora (Light studio), Indian light studio
- Explora, a fictional character in Crush Crush, based on the protagonist of Internet Explorer by Merryweather Media
