= Hofmann Trough =

- Submerged bank Hofmann Trough (Antarctica)
- Interactive map of Hofmann Trough
- Ocean: Southern Ocean

The Hofmann Trough (77°0′S 32°30′W) is a submarine bank in the Weddell Sea. It is named for Walther Hofmann (1920–1993), a cartographer/photogrammetrist on polar expeditions. The name was proposed by Heinrich Hinze of the Alfred Wegener Institute for Polar and Marine Research, Bremerhaven, Germany, and was approved by the Advisory Committee for Undersea Features in June 1997.
