= Benjamin Morrell =

American explorer (1795 – c. 1839)

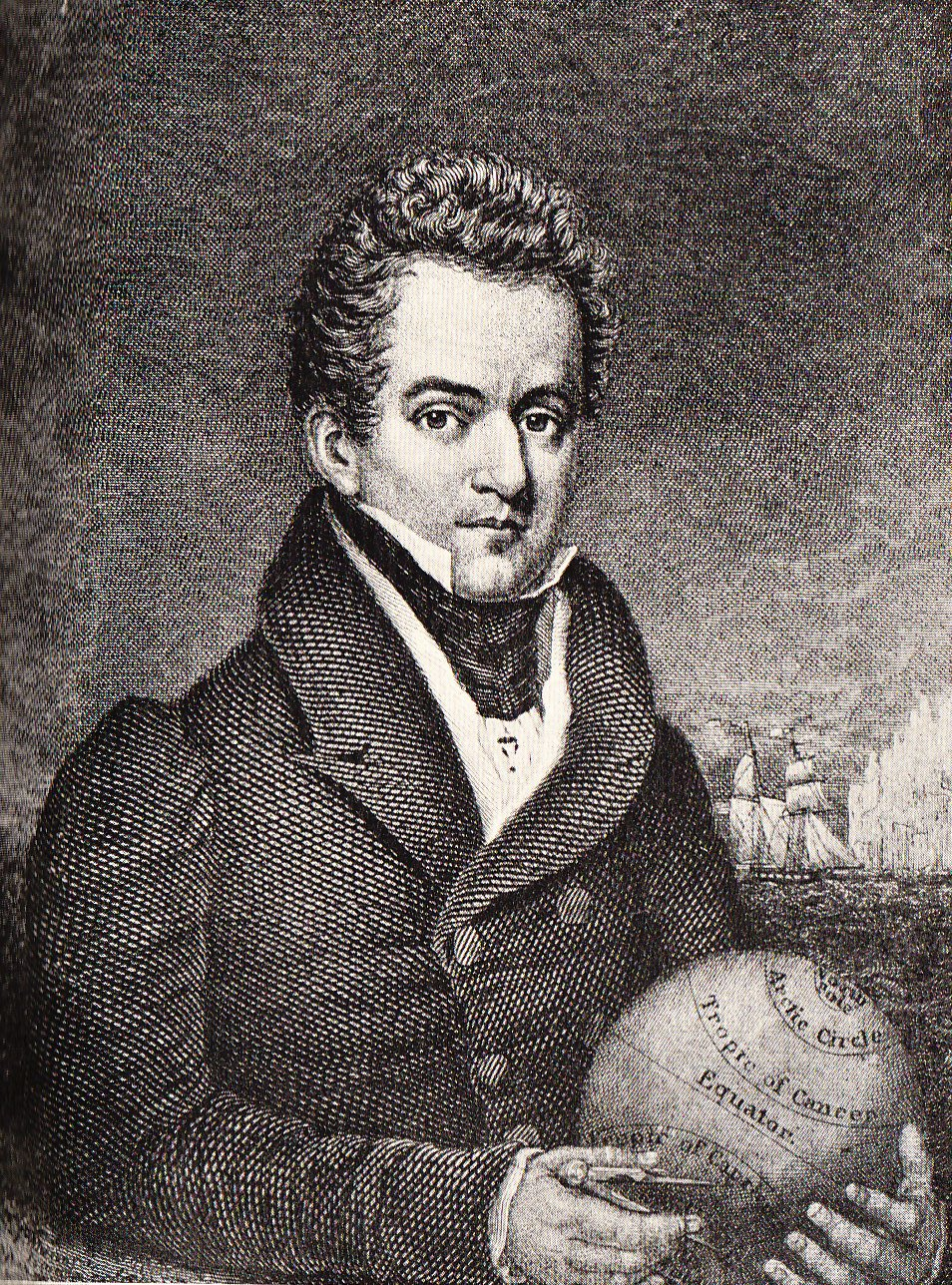
- 1832 engraving of Morrell
- Born: July 5, 1795; Rye, New York, U.S.
- Died: c. 1839 (aged 43–44); Portuguese Mozambique
- Occupation: Sea captain
- Spouse: Abby Jane Wood (m. 1824)
- Children: 1
- Father: Benjamin Morrell Sr

Benjamin Morrell (July 5, 1795 – c. 1839) was an American sea captain, explorer and trader who made a number of voyages, mainly to the Atlantic, the Southern Ocean and the Pacific Islands. In a ghost-written memoir, A Narrative of Four Voyages, which describes his sea-going life between 1823 and 1832, Morrell included numerous claims of discovery and achievement, many of which have been disputed by geographers and historians, and in some cases have been proven false. He ended his career as a fugitive, having wrecked his ship and misappropriated parts of the salvaged cargo.

Morrell had an eventful early career, running away to sea at the age of 17 and being twice captured and imprisoned by the British during the War of 1812. He subsequently sailed before the mast for several years before being appointed as chief mate, and later as captain, of the New York sealer Wasp. In 1823, he took Wasp for an extended voyage into subantarctic waters, and on his return made unsubstantiated claims to have travelled beyond 70°S and to have sighted new coastlines in the area now known as the Weddell Sea. His subsequent voyages mainly centered on the Pacific, where he attempted to develop trading relations with the indigenous populations. Although Morrell wrote of the enormous potential wealth to be obtained from the Pacific trade, his endeavours were, in the main, commercially unprofitable.

Despite his reputation among his contemporaries for untruth and fantasy, Morrell has been defended by some later commentators who, while questioning his general reliability, maintain that not all his life was fraud and exaggeration. They believe that aside from the bombast and boastful tone of the account that carries his name, there is evidence that he carried out useful work, such as his discovery of large-scale guano deposits which led to the development of a full-scale industry. He is believed to have died in 1838 or 1839, in Mozambique; there is, however, evidence to suggest that this death might have been staged, and that he lived on in exile, possibly in South America.

== Early life and career ==
Map of the South Shetland Islands, scene of Morrell's first Antarctic adventures

Morrell was born at Rye, in Westchester County, New York, on July 5, 1795. He grew up in Stonington, Connecticut, where his father, also named Benjamin, was employed as a shipbuilder. Morrell, after minimal schooling, ran away to sea at the age of 17 "without taking leave of any member of my family, or intimating my purpose to a single soul". During the War of 1812, which broke out while he was at sea, he was twice captured by the British; on his first voyage, his ship, carrying a cargo of flour, was intercepted off St John's, Newfoundland, and Morrell was detained for eight months. His second voyage landed him in Dartmoor prison, England, for two years. After his release Morrell continued his seafaring career, sailing before the mast as an ordinary seaman since his lack of education prevented him advancing to officer rank. A sympathetic captain, Josiah Macy, taught him what he needed to know to qualify as an officer, and in 1821 he was appointed chief mate on the sealer Wasp, under Captain Robert Johnson.

Wasp was bound for the South Shetland Islands, which had been discovered three years earlier by the British Captain William Smith. Morrell, who had evidently heard stories of these islands, was keen to go there. On the ensuing voyage he was involved in a series of "remarkable adventures" which included a narrow escape from drowning, then being lost at sea in a small boat during a gale that swept him 50 nautical miles (58 mi; 93 km) from the ship, and leading efforts to extricate Wasp when she became trapped in the ice. On the day following his return to New York, Morrell was appointed captain of Wasp, while Johnson took over the schooner Henry. The two ships were jointly commissioned to return to the South Seas for sealing, trading and exploration, and "to ascertain the practicality, under favourable circumstances.

== Four voyages ==
=== First voyage: South Seas and Pacific Ocean ===
Wasp and Henry sailed from New York on June 21, 1822, and remained together as far as the Falkland Islands. They then separated, Wasp travelling east in search of sealing grounds. Morrell's account of the next few months of the voyage, in Antarctic and subantarctic waters, is controversial. His claims of distances he travelled, latitudes he reached, and discoveries he made have been challenged as inaccurate or impossible, giving substance to his reputation among his contemporaries for untruth, and leading to much criticism by later writers.

==== Antarctic waters ====
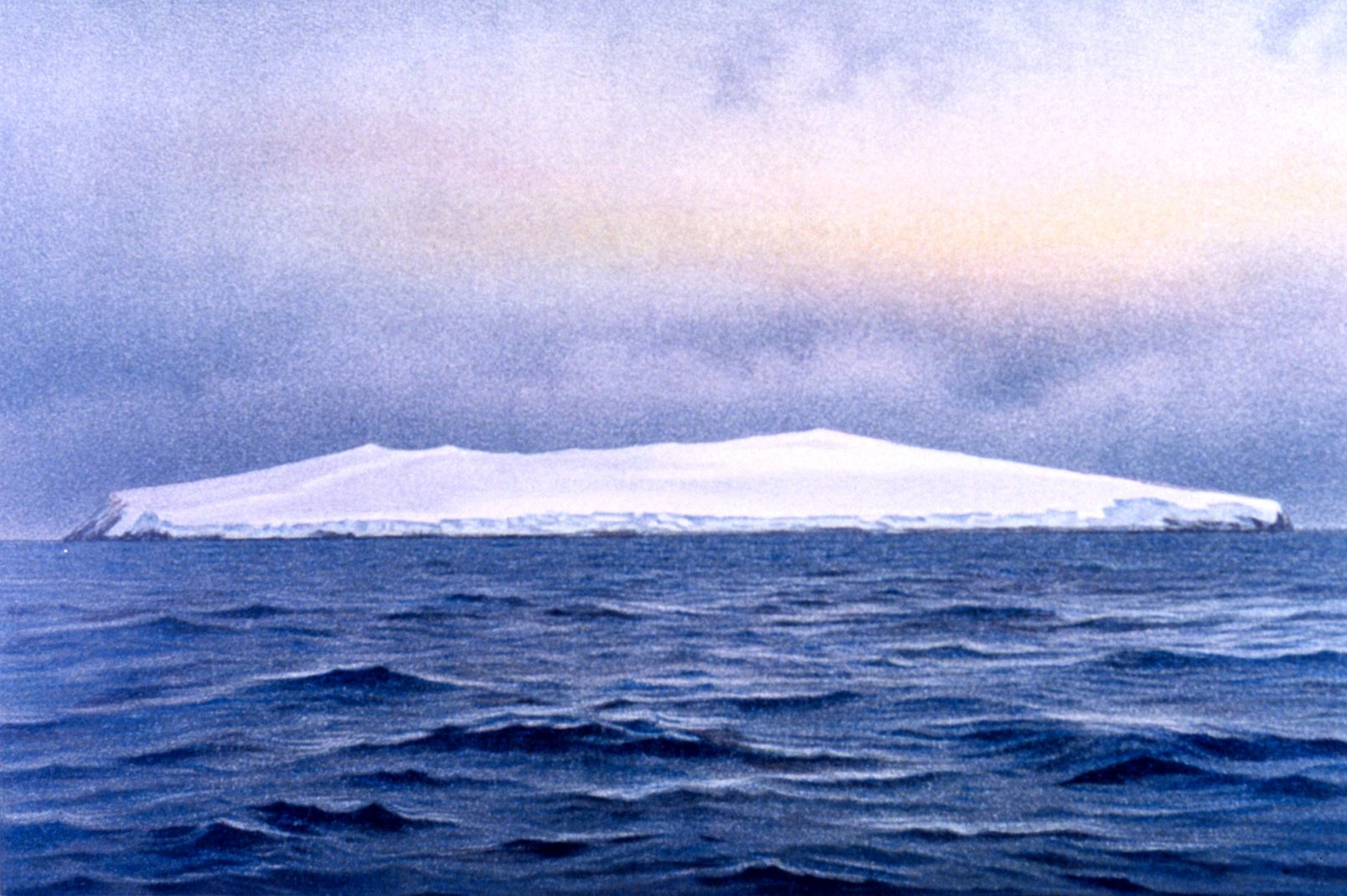
Bouvet Island (1898 photo)

Morrell's journal indicates that Wasp reached South Georgia on November 20, and then sailed eastwards towards the isolated Bouvet Island, which lies approximately midway between Southern Africa and the Antarctic continent and is known as the world's remotest island. It had been discovered in 1739 by the French navigator Jean-Baptiste Charles Bouvet de Lozier, but his plotting of its position was inaccurate; Captain James Cook, in 1772, had been unable to find it and had assumed its nonexistence. It had not been seen again until 1808, when the British sealing captains James Lindsay and Thomas Hopper reached it and recorded its correct position, although they were unable to land. Morrell, by his own account, found the island without difficulty—with "improbable ease", in the words of historian William Mills— before landing and hunting seals there. In his subsequent lengthy description, Morrell does not mention the island's most obvious physical feature, its permanent ice cover. This has caused some commentators to doubt that he actually visited the island.

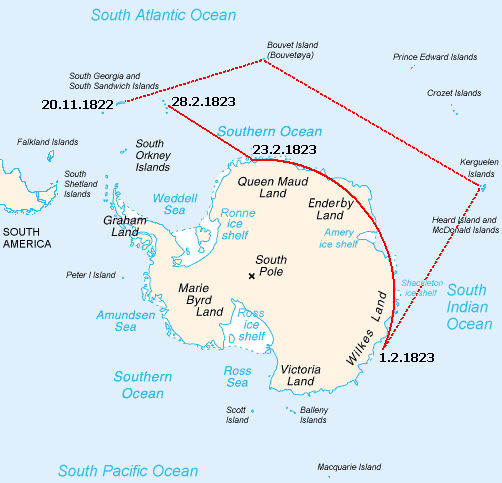
Sketch of Wasp's voyage track, November 20, 1822, to February 28, 1823, based on Morrell's claimed positions. Much of the return journey (continuous line) is within the Antarctic coastline.

After leaving Bouvet Island, Wasp continued eastward, reaching the Kerguelen Islands on December 31, 1822, where she remained for 11 days. The voyage then evidently continued to the south and east until February 1, 1823, when Morrell records his position as 65°52'S, 118°27'E. Here, Morrell says he took advantage of an eleven-knot breeze and turned the ship, to begin a passage westward. Apart from one undated position at 69°11'S, 48°15'E, Morrell's journal is silent until February 23, when he records crossing the Greenwich (0°) meridian. Historians have doubted that such a long passage from 118°E, about 3,500 nautical miles (4,000 mi; 6,500 km), could have been made so quickly in ice-strewn waters and against the prevailing winds. Although some writers, including former Royal Navy navigator Rupert Gould, have argued that Morrell's claims as to speed and distance are plausible, Morrell's undated interim latitude was later shown to be well inside the Antarctic mainland territory of Enderby Land. Gould, writing in 1928 before the continental boundaries of this sector of Antarctica were known, based his support for Morrell on the premise that Enderby Land was an island with a sea channel south of it. He added: "If at some future date Enderby Land is found to form part of the Antarctic continent, Morrell's most inveterate champions will, perforce, have to throw up the sponge."

According to Morrell, Wasp reached the South Sandwich Islands on February 28. His presence there is corroborated by his descriptions of the harbour on Thule Island, confirmed by the early 20th century expeditions. In the next phase of the voyage Morrell records that he took Wasp southwards and, the sea being remarkably clear of ice, reached a latitude of 70°14'S before turning north on March 14 as fuel for the ship's stoves was running out. This journey, if Morrell's account is true, made him the first American sea-captain to penetrate the Antarctic Circle. He believed, he says, that but for this deficiency he could have "made a glorious advance directly to the South Pole, or to 85° without the least doubt". Some credence to his claimed southern latitude is provided by James Weddell's voyage on a similar track, a month earlier, which reached 74°15'S before retreating. The words used by Weddell to express his belief that the South Pole lay in open water are replicated by Morrell, whose account was written nine years after the event. Thus it is suggested by geographer Paul Simpson-Housley that Morrell may have plagiarised Weddell's experiences, since Weddell's account had been published in 1827.

==== New South Greenland ====
Morrell's account describes how on the day after turning north from his southernmost point, a large tract of land was sighted in the region of 67°52'S, 44°11'W. Morrell refers to this land as "New South Greenland", and records that during the next few days Wasp explored more than 300 nautical miles (350 mi; 560 km) of coast. Morrell provided vivid descriptions of the land's features, with observations of its abundant wildlife. No such land exists; other appearances of land at or near this bearing, reported during the 1842 expedition of Sir James Clark Ross, have likewise proved imaginary. In 1917, the British explorer William Speirs Bruce wrote that the existence of land in this area "should not be rejected until absolutely disproved." By this time both Wilhelm Filchner and Ernest Shackleton, in their respective ice-bound ships, had drifted close to the plotted positions of New South Greenland and reported no sign of it. It has been suggested that what Morrell saw was actually the eastern coast of the Antarctic Peninsula, some 400 nautical miles (460 mi; 740 km) further west from his sighting. This would require a navigational error of at least 10°, and a complete revision of Morrell's timeline after leaving the South Sandwich Islands. Assuming that Morrell did not invent the experience, a possible explanation is that he witnessed a superior mirage.

==== Pacific and home ====
On March 19, Morrell "bade farewell to the cheerless shores of New South Greenland", and sailed away from the Antarctic never to return. The remaining stages of the voyage are uncontroversial, involving a year-long cruise in the Pacific Ocean. This took Wasp to the Galápagos Islands and also to the island of Más a Tierra where, a century earlier, the Scottish seaman Alexander Selkirk had been marooned, providing the inspiration for the Robinson Crusoe story. Wasp returned to New York in May 1824. There, he found that his wife whom he had married in 1819, not named in any accounts of Morrell's life or career, and his two small children, likewise unnamed, had all died. He quickly married his 15-year-old cousin, Abigail Jane Wood ("Abby").

=== Second voyage: North and South Pacific ===
For his second voyage, Morrell took charge of a new ship, Tartar, which sailed from New York on July 19, 1824, for the Pacific Ocean. In the next two years, Tartar first explored the American coastline from the Straits of Magellan to Cape Blanco (now in Oregon). He then sailed westward to the islands of Hawaii, known at that time as the Sandwich Islands, where Captain James Cook had met his death nearly 40 years earlier. He claims to have discovered two new islands, Byers's Island and Morrell's Island. Thereafter Tartar returned to the American coast and tracked slowly southwards back to the Straits of Magellan.

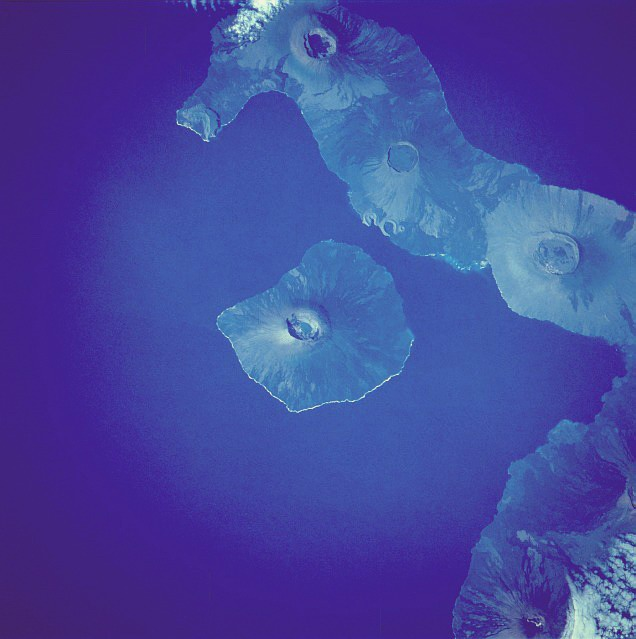
Fernandina Island in the Galápagos, where Morrell witnessed a spectacular volcanic eruption on February 14, 1825

Among the events witnessed and recorded in Morrell's journal were the siege of Callao, the main port of Peru, by Simón Bolívar's liberators, and a spectacular volcanic eruption on Fernandina Island in the Galápagos archipelago, which Tartar visited during February 1825. Fernandina, then known as Narborough Island, exploded on February 14. In Morrell's words "The heavens appeared to be one blaze of fire, intermingling with millions of falling stars and meteors; while the flames shot upward from the peak of Narborough to the height of at least two thousand feet." Morrell reports that the air temperature reached 123 °F (51 °C), and as Tartar approached the river of lava flowing into the sea, the water temperature rose to 150 °F (66 °C). Some of the crew collapsed in the heat.

Morrell also records how a hunting trip ashore in California led to a skirmish with the locals which turned into a full-scale battle ending, he says, with seventeen natives dead and seven of Tartar's men wounded. Morrell claims that he was among the casualties, with an arrow in his thigh. Of a visit to San Francisco Morrell writes: "The inhabitants are principally Mexicans and Spaniards who are very indolent and consequently very filthy." After revisiting the Galapagos Islands and gathering a harvest of fur seal and terrapin, Tartar began a slow journey home on October 13, 1825. As they left the Pacific Morrell claimed to have personally inspected and identified every danger existing along the American Pacific coast. Tartar finally reached New York Harbor on May 8, 1826, with a main cargo of 6,000 fur seals. This haul did not please Morrell's employers, who had evidently expected rather more. "The reception I met from my owners was cold and repulsive", he wrote. "The Tartar did not return home laden with silver and gold, and therefore my toils and dangers counted for nothing".

=== Third voyage: West African coast ===
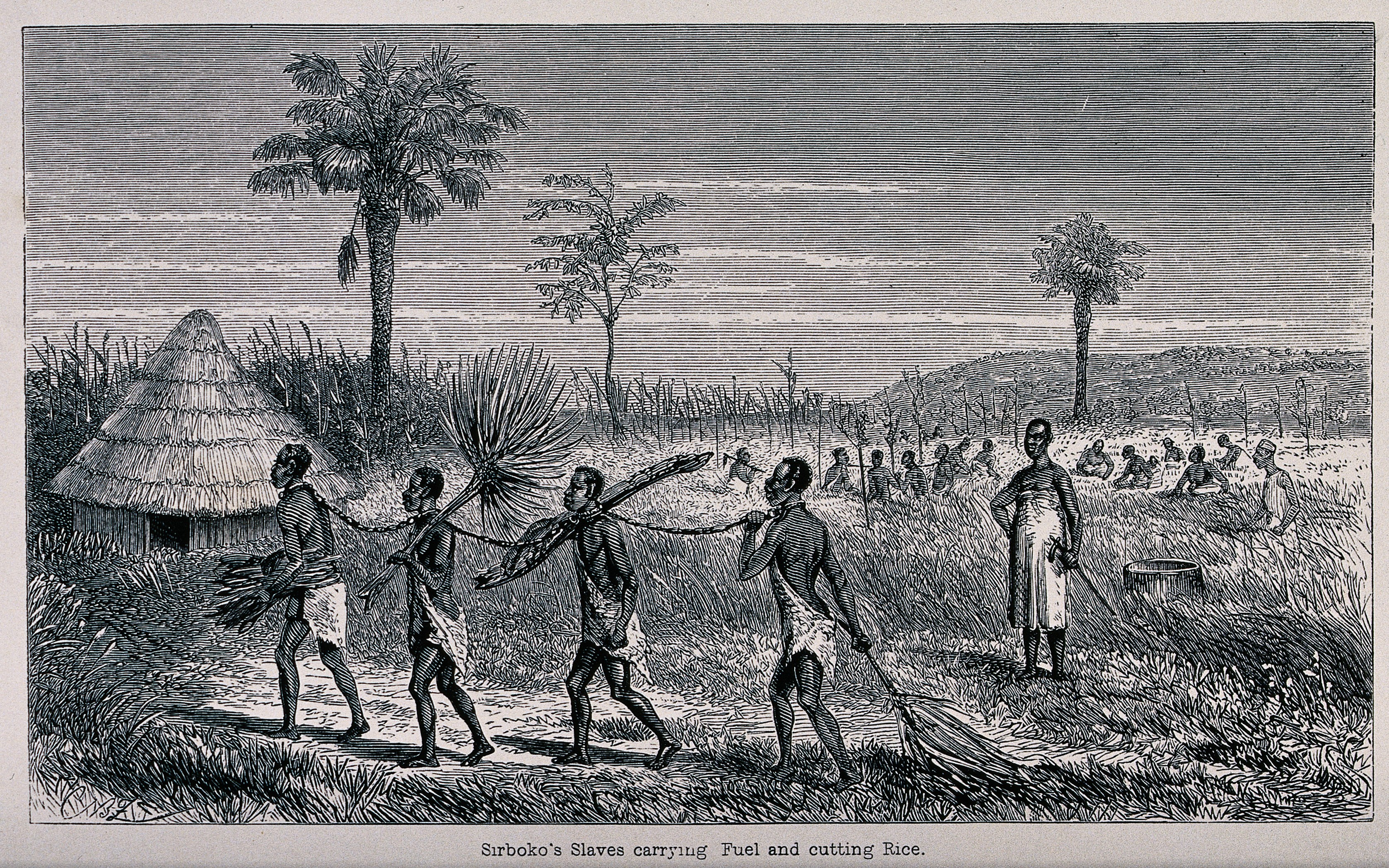
A 19th-century depiction of African slaves

In 1828, Morrell was engaged by Messrs. Christian Bergh & Co. to take command of the schooner Antarctic (named, he claims, in honour of his earlier Antarctic achievements). Antarctic left New York on June 25, 1828, bound for Western Africa. During the following months Morrell carried out an extensive survey of the African coast between the Cape of Good Hope and Benguela, and led several short excursions inland. He was impressed by the commercial potential of this coast, recording that "many kinds of skins may be procured about here, including those of the leopard, fox, bullock, together with ostrich feathers and valuable minerals". At Ichaboe Island he discovered huge deposits of guano, 25 feet thick. In the face of such opportunity he records his belief that a $30,000 investment would produce in two years a profit "from ten to fifteen hundred per cent."

During the voyage, Morrell experienced several encounters with the slave trade, first at the Cape Verde Islands, then a centre for the trade because of its geographical position in relation to the Americas, Europe and Africa. He found the slaves' conditions wretched, but was impressed by their passion for music which, he thought, "can alleviate even the pangs caused by the galling fetters of slavery". Later in the voyage he witnessed what he describes as "horrid barbarity", including the spectacle of two women slaves in their death agonies as a result of floggings. A lengthy soliloquy in his journal on the evils of slavery concludes:

[T]he root, the source, the foundation of the evil is the ignorance and superstition of the poor negroes themselves. Could they become only partially civilized, and sufficiently enlightened to see the beauty of the plainest moral precepts of our religion, they would no longer feel themselves obligated to obey the unjust mandates of a ruthless despot, who levies war on his neighbours, not for any real or imaginary injury received, but for the sole purpose of raising a revenue by the sale of his captives.

On June 8, 1829, Morrell wrote in his journal: "The voyage had been prosperous beyond our expectations, and any further stay on the African coast would have been a waste of time and money". He arrived in New York on July 14.

=== Fourth voyage: South Seas and Pacific Ocean ===
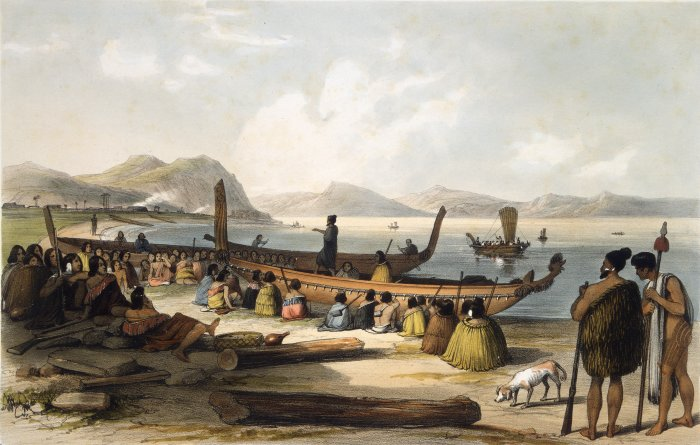
A Pacific war canoe, with warriors. Morrell's party encountered similar armed vessels during its skirmishes in the Pacific isles.

According to Morrell, Antarctic's owners were unanimous that he should make another voyage with the ship, and in September 1829 Antarctic left New York, bound for the South Atlantic and Pacific in search of seals. At her own insistence, and against Morrell's and the owners' advice, his wife Abby Jane Morrell accompanied him. By January 1830, Antarctic had reached the Auckland Islands, south of New Zealand, where Morrell had hoped for a rich harvest of seal, but found the waters empty. He sailed north for Manila in the Philippines, hoping to find a commercial cargo there, and arrived in March 1830. No such cargo was available, but Morrell was persuaded by the American consul, George Hubbell, that a potentially profitable enterprise would be to collect sea cucumbers (otherwise known as "Bêche-de-mer"), plentifully available in the islands now known as Micronesia. These could then be taken to China where they were much prized.

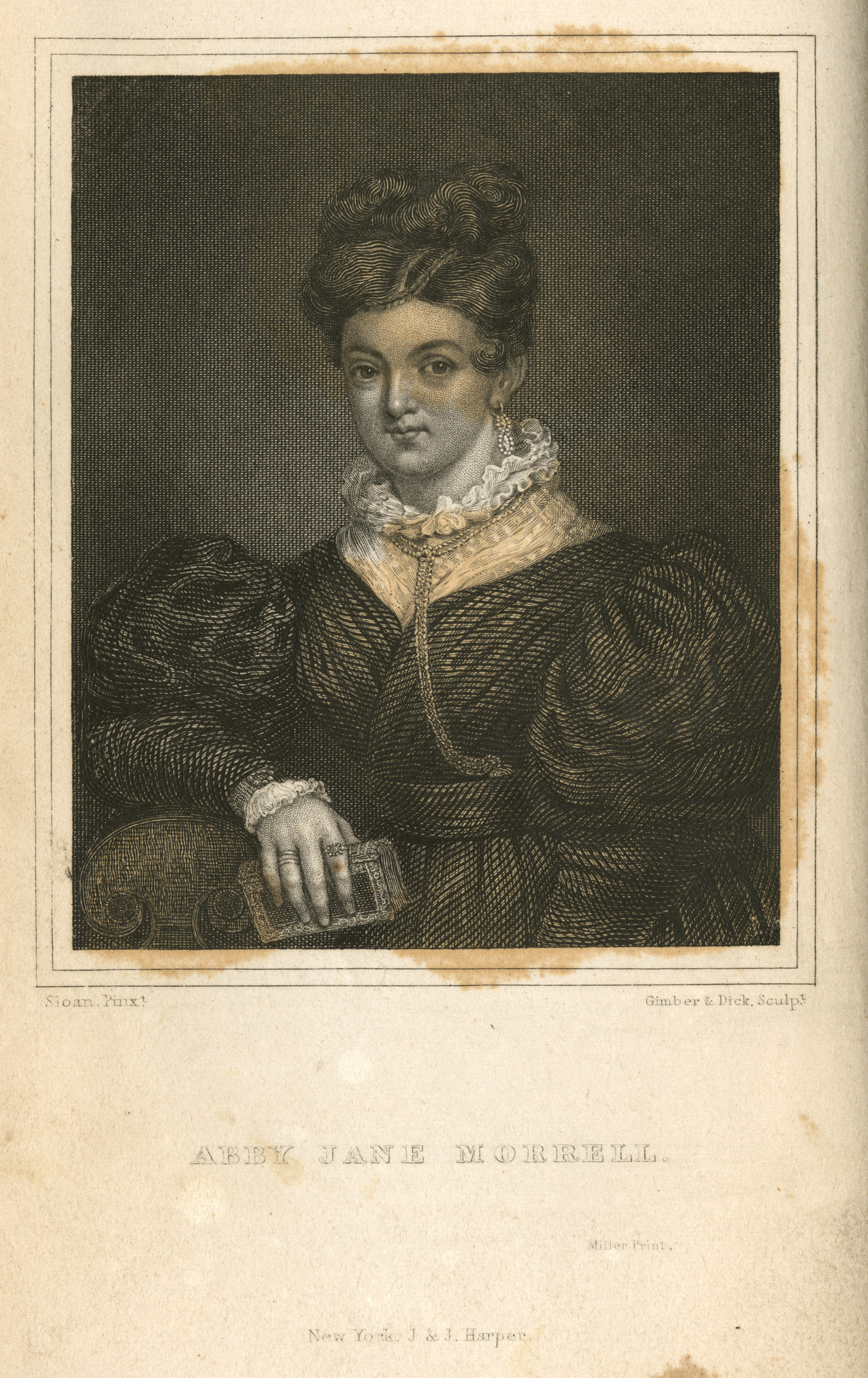
Abby Jane Morrell

Hubbell would not permit Antarctic to sail with Abby on board; possibly he had designs on her. Morrell sailed from Manila without her, and initially had little luck in finding sea cucumbers in any quantity. Eventually Antarctic reached the Carteret Islands, a small atoll which now forms part of Papua New Guinea, and found sea cucumbers in abundance. Morrell set up camp on one of the islands, where he faced a hostile reception from the population, who were nevertheless intrigued by their first sight of metal. There were thefts of tools; Morrell responded by holding several chiefs as hostages, at which the islanders mounted a full-scale attack on Morrell's shore base. Fourteen crew members were killed; Antarctic was forced to make a hasty withdrawal, leaving much equipment behind.

Morrell retreated to Manila, planning retaliation. He hired a large number of Manilans to augment his crew, and with a help of a loan from the British consul, adapted Antarctica and fitted her with guns and cannons. The ship, with Abby now on board, returned to the Carteret Islands and attacked with gunfire. After a series of such assaults and heavy casualties, the population sued for peace. This enabled Morrell to occupy one of the islands in exchange for cutlery, trinkets, tools and other metal artefacts. The peace was temporary; Morrell's shore camp was continually harassed by the population. Finally, Morrell decided to abandon the enterprise, citing the "unappeasable vindictiveness and incessant hostilities" of the native population.

On November 13, 1830, while returning to Manila, Antarctica anchored off the coast of the island of Uneapa (in today's West New Britain Province). A flotilla of native canoes approached the ship, full of apparently well-armed and aggressive islanders. After his experiences at Carteret Island, Morrell took no chances and ordered his crew to fire. The small craft were shattered; many died, while others manage to regain the shore. One man, who had clung to Antarctic's rudder, was hauled on board as a prisoner. The crew named him "Sunday"—his actual name was Dako. An account of this engagement was entered into the ship's log by John Keeler, the ship's young navigator. Just over a week later, on November 22, a skirmish in the Ninigo Islands brought Morrell another captive, whom the crew named "Monday" (his true name was never discovered). With two native prisoners, but little else to show from this venture, Antarctic returned to Manila in mid-December.

By now desperate for some profitable activity, Morrell made some money by displaying Dako and Monday to a fascinated public. The only maritime opportunity available was to take a cargo to Cádiz, which he was obliged to accept. He left Manila on January 13, 1831, taking his captives with him. When Antarctic reached Cádiz five months later the port was under quarantine and closed. He was forced to discharge the cargo in Bordeaux, where Dako and Monday, rumored in the town to be cannibals, again attracted great curiosity. Antarctic finally reached New York on August 27, 1831; despite his lack of commercial success, Morrell remained upbeat about future prospects in the Pacific. "I could, with only a modest share of patronage ... open a new avenue of trade more lucrative than any that our country has ever yet enjoyed, and further, it would be in my power, and mine alone, to secure the monopoly for any term I pleased." In the final paragraph of his account of the Morrell records that his wife's father, her aunt and her aunt's child had all died during his absence, as had one of Morrell's cousins and her husband.

== Later career ==
=== Money-making ===
When he returned to New York after his profitless fourth voyage, Morrell was heavily in debt and in urgent need of funds. Newspapers showed great interest in the story of the voyage, and Morrell was keen to cash in. Within a few days of his arrival he had organised a stage show, entitled "Two Cannibals of the Islands of the South Pacific". This spectacle, embellished with accounts of the massacre at Carteret Island and other dramatic inclusions, played to large crowds at New York's Rubens Peale museum. In October 1831 Morrell took the show on a tour, which began in Albany on October 10. Among those who visited the show was the 12-year-old Herman Melville, the future author of Moby-Dick, who may have based the character of Queequeg on his memory of Dako. The tour proceeded to Philadelphia, Baltimore and finally Washington D.C., before ending in January 1832, at which point Morrell returned the show to Peale's.

Morrell's second projected source of funds was his account of his voyages, which the firm of J. and J. Harper were willing to publish. They engaged an experienced writer and dramatist, Samuel Woodworth, to make sense of Morrell's notes and sea journals, although Woodworth's role as ghost writer was not made public. Abby Morrell's journals received similar treatment from another established author, Samuel Knapp. His book was published in December 1832, hers early in 1833. Morrell's was very successful and sold well; the New York Mirror found it "a highly interesting and instructive work", with "stirring adventures and much geographical and nautical information". France's leading explorer Jules Dumont d'Urville was complimentary, acknowledging Morrell as "courageous, skilled and dedicated"; the explorer and journalist Jeremiah Reynolds, on the other hand, observed that the account contained more poetry than truth. Abby's book attracted less attention. It purported to be written to promote "the amelioration of the condition of the American seaman", a subject in which she had not otherwise evinced interest. Woodworth exploited the public's curiosity by preparing a stage play, The Cannibals, which opened at the Bowery Theatre, New York, in March 1833 and had a lengthy and successful run. Morrell's ghosted account was one of the sources used by Edgar Allan Poe in his novel The Narrative of Arthur Gordon Pym.

=== Return to the Pacific ===
With the restoration of his fortunes and his new-found fame, Morrell began plans for a further Pacific voyage, intending to return Dako and Monday to their islands and exploit further trading opportunities. Having lobbied unsuccessfully for Congressional funding, Morrell eventually found backers who secured a converted brigantine, Margaret Oakley, in which he set sail from New York on March 9, 1834. Among the crew was Samuel Woodworth's 18-year-old son Selim Woodworth, whose journals and letters provided a record of the voyage. Monday was not with them; he had died a year previously.

Margaret Oakley took the westerly route to the Pacific, across the Atlantic to the Cape Verde Islands, then south to the Cape of Good Hope and across the Indian Ocean, arriving in the vicinity of Dako's home islands in November 1834. Dako was received rapturously by his people, as one who had returned from the dead. Morrell remained in the area for several months, exploring and collecting artefacts, before departing in April 1835 for Port Jackson (Sydney Harbour) in Australia for repairs and repainting. By June, Morrell was back among the Pacific islands, where he took his final leave of Dako. After a fruitless interval prospecting for gold on the New Guinea mainland, Morrell took the ship to Canton in China, where he found a valuable cargo for New York on which he anticipated a profit of $100,000.

After leaving Canton on November 14, Margaret Oakley was delayed in Singapore by bad weather, where some of the cargo was sold to pay for repairs. The ship left Singapore on December 31, 1835, and was seen off Mauritius in early February 1836, but then disappeared. She was given up for lost with all her crew before, months later, news arrived in Mauritius that she had been wrecked on the coast of Madagascar. The crew was rescued, although much of the ship's cargo was lost in the wreck, and more was used to pay off the rescuers and other of Morrell's debts. When representatives of the insurers arrived in Madagascar to assess the loss, they discovered that Morrell had departed, taking part of the remaining cargo with him. He found his way to South Africa, where he boarded a British ship, Rio Packet, bound for London. Outside US jurisdiction, he was beyond the reach of the American authorities, who equated his actions with piracy.

=== Final years and death ===
In London early in 1837, Morrell attempted to convert some of the purloined cargo into cash, but word of his activities had spread, and the proceeds were immediately confiscated by agents acting for Margaret Oakley's insurers. His reputation as a probable fraud prevented him from finding new employment; he sought work with the shipping firm of Enderby Brothers, but Charles Enderby said that "he had heard so much of [Morrell] that he did not think fit to enter into any engagement with him." Thwarted in London, Morrell turned his attention to France. He had heard that d'Urville was organising an expedition to the Antarctic, and on June 20, 1837, wrote to the French Geographical Society in Paris to offer his services: "I will engage to place the Proud Banner of France ten degrees nearer the Pole than any other Banner has ever been planted, providing I can obtain the command of a Small schooner ... properly manned and equipped". His offer was declined; Morrell was by now regarded as a fraud in France as well as in Britain and America.

It is not known how Morrell supported himself during his months in London; it is possible that Abby sent him funds from America. Somehow, in the autumn of 1837, he made his way to Havana in Cuba, after which his movements are unclear. It appears that he eventually obtained command of a vessel, possibly the Christine, and that he sailed in September 1838, probably planning a return to the Pacific. He got no further than Mozambique on the East African coast; his ship was wrecked, and Morrell was stranded ashore. He is reported to have died, either of fever or during an insurrection, in late 1838 or early 1839. This story is complicated by an alternative account indicating that Christine was wrecked a year later, early in 1840, although whether Morrell was alive and in command by that date is unrecorded. Christine was known as a slave ship, which raises the possibility that in his final years Morrell was engaged with the slave trade. Fairhead suggests an alternative hypothesis: that Morrell staged his death in Mozambique, to evade Margaret Oakley's insurers. In this scenario, he may have escaped to South America and lived out his days there. A letter dated August 11, 1843, to the editor of The New York Commercial Advertiser and signed "Morrell" could have been written, Fairhead maintains, only by someone with intimate knowledge of the Oakley voyage. Fairhead offers no explanation why Morrell, if alive, should break his silence other than: "Perhaps, like many criminals, he could not resist flaunting himself".

There is little documented history for Abby Morrell after 1838: two records, respectively dated 1841 and 1850, place her in New York, but details of her life and eventual death are unknown.

== Assessment ==
Despite Morrell's exposure as a fraud following the Margaret Oakley debacle, his contemporaries did not uniformly denounce him. To some, he was "the biggest liar in the Pacific", and d'Urville, who had earlier warmly praised Morrell's Four Voyages account, turned on the American and accused him of fabricating many of his supposed discoveries. However, Jeremiah Reynolds, who had expressed scepticism over the narrative, included Morrell's Pacific discoveries in his report to Congress A Report in relation to islands, reefs, and shoals in the Pacific Ocean. This, says Simpson-Housley, was surely a compliment to the otherwise disgraced navigator.

Later commentators and historians have tended to assess his career with a degree of sympathy. Hugh Robert Mill of the Royal Geographical Society, writing in 1905, considered that a man may be ignorant and boastful, yet still do solid work. Mill thought Morrell "intolerably vain, and as great a braggart as any hero of autobiographical romance", but still found the narrative itself "most entertaining". Rupert Gould, writing in 1928, thought that Morrell may have been boastful and self-aggrandizing, but that did not make him a deliberate liar. Gould points to the accurate information provided by Morrell on the discovery of the guano deposits on Ichaboe Island, which laid the foundations of a flourishing industry.

William Mills, a much more recent commentator, echoes the view that "something may be salvaged from Morrell's account, although much of it must be discarded". In regard to the Antarctic discoveries, which are Mills's particular concern, he points out that these are given no special emphasis. Morrell does not seem to regard the Antarctic expedition as particularly remarkable, and the discovery of "New South Greenland" is not claimed by Morrell himself but is credited to Captain Johnson in 1821. In the preface to his Four Voyages book, Morrell admits that he incorporated the experiences of others into his account. Paul Simpson-Housley suggests that as well as adapting Weddell's narrative as his own experience, Morrell may have taken the details of his 1823 visit to Bouvet Island from the records of an 1825 visit by Captain George Norris,

As a reminder of Morrell's brief Antarctic exploits, Morrell Island, at 59°27'S, 27°19'W, is an alternative name for Thule Island in the Southern Thule sub-group of the South Sandwich Islands. During his Pacific travels Morrell encountered groups of islands that were not on his charts, treated them as new discoveries and named them after various New York acquaintances – Westervelt, Bergh, Livingstone, Skiddy. One was named "Young William Group" after Morrell's infant son. None of these names appear in modern maps, although the "Livingstone Group" has been identified with Namonuito Atoll, and "Bergh's Group" with the Chuuk Islands.

== Sources ==
=== Books and journals ===
- Baker, Samuel White (2008). "Eight Years' Wandering in Ceylon". Project Gutenberg.
- Fairhead, James (2015). The Captain and "the Cannibal" (EPUB ed.). New Haven, Connecticut: Yale University Press. ISBN 978-1-3-2287036-6.
- Garraty, John A.; Carnes, Mark C., eds. (1999). American National Biography. Vol. 15. Garraty, John A. (general ed.). New York: Oxford University Press. ISBN 0-19-512794-3.
- Gould, Rupert T. (1929). Enigmas. London: Philip Allan & Co. ISBN 0-517-31081-3.
- Keynes, R. D., ed. (1979). The Beagle Record. Cambridge: Cambridge University Press. ISBN 978-0-521-21822-1.
- Kricher, John C. (2006). Galapagos: A Natural History. Princeton: Princeton University Press. ISBN 978-0-691-12633-3.
- McGonigal, David (2003). Antarctica. London: Frances Lincoln. ISBN 978-0-7112-2980-8.
- Malone, Dumas, ed. (1934). Dictionary of American Biography. Vol. VI. New York: Charles Scribner's Sons.
- Mill, Hugh Robert (1905). The Siege of the South Pole. London: Alston Rivers.
- Mills, William James (2003). Exploring Polar Frontiers. ABC-CLIO, Santa Barbara. ISBN 1-57607-422-6.
- Morrell, Benjamin (1832). A Narrative of Four Voyages ... etc. New York: J & J Harper.
- Novatti, Ricardo (1963). "Pelagic Distribution of Birds in the Weddell Sea" (PDF). Polarforsch (33). German Society of Polar Research: 207–213.
- Peeples, Scott (1998). Edgar Allan Poe Revisited. New York: Twayne Publishers. ISBN 0-8057-4572-6.
- Ridgely, J. V. (June 1970). "The Continuing Puzzle of Arthur Gordon Pym: Some Notes and Queries". Poe Newsletter. III (1). Washington State University Press: 5–6. doi:10.1111/j.1754-6095.1970.tb00131.x.
- Rodriguez, Jaime E (1998). The Independence of Spanish America. Cambridge: Cambridge University Press. ISBN 978-0-521-62673-6.
- Shackleton, Ernest (1983). South. London: Century Publishing. ISBN 0-7126-0111-2.
- Simpson-Housley, Paul (1992). Antarctica:Exploration, Perception and Metaphor. New York: Routledge. ISBN 978-0-415-08225-9.
- Stewart, Murray; et al. (2014). Cape Verde. Chalfont St Peter: Bradt Travel Guides. ISBN 978-1-84162-495-2.

=== Online ===
- "A recently revealed tino aitu figure from Nukuoro Island" (PDF). Fine Arts Museum of San Francisco. Archived from the original (PDF) on February 18, 2012.
- "Exploration Through the Ages: James Weddell". The Mariners' Museum. Archived from the original on July 25, 2012.
- "Foreign Ships in Micronesia: Pohnpei". Micronesian Seminar.
- "Foreign Ships in Micronesia: Chuuk". Micronesian Seminar.
- "Ichaboe Island, Namibia". Animal Demography Unit, Namibia.
- Introduction to Penguin Classics edition of The Narrative of Arthur Gordon Pym of Nantucket by E.A. Poe. Penguin Books. 1999. ISBN 978-0-14-043748-5.
- "Jean-Baptiste Charles Bouver de Lozier, 1704–86". SouthPole.com.
- "Slavery in Cape Verde". United Nations Educational, Scientific and Cultural Organization. Archived from the original on March 13, 2005.
- "South Georgia and the South Sandwich Islands". Geonames. 2008.
- "Turtles of the World". University of Amsterdam. Archived from the original on March 18, 2012.
- "Two extraordinary travellers: Alexander Selkirk – the real Robinson Crusoe?". British Broadcasting Corporation.
- "Two Hundred Years Before the Mast – Personal Narratives". University of Delaware.
- Jenssen, Elin Vinje (January 3, 2008). "Weather, wind and activity on Bouvetøya". Translated by Marte Lundberg. Norwegian Polar Institute. Archived from the original on January 19, 2015.
- "Wilhelm Filchner 1877–1957". South-pole.com.
