= Helmert Bank =

- Submerged bank Helmert Bank (Antarctica)
- Interactive map of Helmert Bank
- Ocean: Southern Ocean

Helmert Bank (75°0′S 29°20′W) is a submarine bank in the Weddell Sea named for the German geodesist Friedrich Robert Helmert. The name was proposed by Dr. Heinrich Hinze of the Alfred Wegener Institute for Polar and Marine Research, Bremerhaven, Germany, and was approved by the Advisory Committee for Undersea Features in June 1997.
