= Albert Bank =

- Submerged bank Albert Bank (Antarctica)
- Interactive map of Albert Bank
- Ocean: Southern Ocean

Albert Bank (77°10′S 32°45′W), also known as Prince Albert I Bank, is a submarine bank in the Weddell Sea named for Albert I of Monaco, instrumental in initiating the first GEBCO charts (1903). The name was proposed by Dr. Heinrich Hinze, Alfred Wegener Institute for Polar and Marine Research, Bremerhaven, Germany, and approved in June 1997.
