= Andenes Knoll =

Undersea knoll in the Weddell Sea

Andenes Knoll (72°26′S 22°50′W) is the southeasternmost knoll in a group of three knolls in the Weddell Sea, the other two being Explora Knoll and Polarstern Knoll. It was named for the Norwegian coast-guard vessel K.V. Andenes, the name being proposed by Dr. Heinrich Hinze of the Alfred Wegener Institute for Polar and Marine Research, Bremerhaven, Germany, and approved by the Advisory Committee on Undersea Features in June, 1997.
