= Berkner Bank =

- Submerged bank Berkner Bank (Antarctica)
- Interactive map of Berkner Bank
- Ocean: Southern Ocean

Berkner Bank (75°S 48°W) is an undersea bank in the Weddell Sea named after Lloyd V. Berkner, an engineer who sailed with Admiral Byrd on the Byrd Antarctic Expedition to Antarctica, 1928–1930. The name was approved by the Advisory Committee for Undersea Features in April 1973.
