= Vinci Bank =

- Submerged bank Vinci Bank (Antarctica)
- Interactive map of Vinci Bank
- Ocean: Southern Ocean

Vinci Bank (77°30′S 34°30′W) is a submarine bank in the Weddell Sea. It is named after Leonardo da Vinci (1452–1519), world-renowned scientist and artist. The name was proposed by Dr. Heinrich Hinze, Alfred Wegener Institute for Polar and Marine Research, Bremerhaven, Germany. Name approved 6/97 (ACUF 271).
