= Belgrano Bank =

- Submerged bank Belgrano Bank (Antarctica)
- Interactive map of Belgrano Bank
- Ocean: Southern Ocean

Belgrano Bank (73°0′S 48°30′W) is an undersea bank in the Weddell Sea. It is named after General Manuel Belgrano, an Argentine general and revolutionary hero, after whom the main Argentine Antarctic base is also named. The name of the bank was approved by the Advisory Committee for Undersea Features in June, 1988.
