= Dream Bank =

Ocean bank and drowned reef in the northwestern Gulf of Mexico

Coordinates: 27.041667°N 96.708333°W

Dream Bank is an ocean bank and drowned reef, off the coast of south Texas in the Gulf of Mexico. It has distinct terraces show past stable sea levels. Other nearby drowned reefs include Baker, Aransas, Blackfish, Mysterious, and one other.
