= Behm Bank =

- Submerged bank Behm Bank (Antarctica)
- Interactive map of Behm Bank
- Ocean: Southern Ocean

Behm Bank (76°21′S 30°0′W) is an undersea bank in the Weddell Sea named for Alexander Behm, the inventor in 1912–13 of an electronic sounding apparatus. The name was proposed by Dr. Heinrich Hinze of the Alfred Wegener Institute for Polar and Marine Research, Bremerhaven, Germany, and approved by the Advisory Committee for Undersea Features in June 1997.
