= Rinner Trough =

The Rinner Trough (77°40′S 35°0′W) is an undersea trough in the Weddell Sea named for Karl Rinner (1921–1991), an Austrian geodesist and founder of the journal Marine Geodesy. The name was proposed by Heinrich Hinze at the Alfred Wegener Institute for Polar and Marine Research, Bremerhaven, Germany. The name was approved by the Advisory Committee on Undersea Features in June 1997.
