= Weddell Sea =

Part of the Southern Ocean between Coats Land and the Antarctic Peninsula

- The location of the Weddell Sea, part of the Southern Ocean
- Interactive map of Weddell Sea
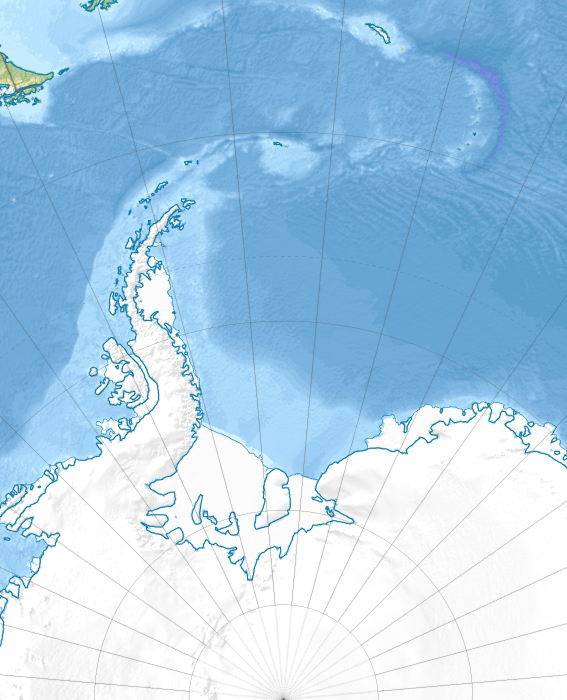
- Map of the Weddell Sea with bathymetry and surrounding relief
- Location: Southern Ocean
- Coordinates: 73°S 45°W
- Type: Sea
- Basin countries: Argentine Antarctica, British Antarctic Territory, partially within the Antarctic Chilean Territory.
- Surface area: 2,800,000 km^{2} (1,081,100 sq mi)
- Average depth: 500 m (1,640 ft)
- Max. depth: 5,148 m (16,890 ft)
- Frozen: partially

The Weddell Sea is part of the Southern Ocean and contains the Weddell Gyre. Its land boundaries are defined by the bay formed from the coasts of Coats Land and the Antarctic Peninsula. The easternmost point is Cape Norvegia at Princess Martha Coast, Queen Maud Land. To the east of Cape Norvegia is the King Haakon VII Sea. Much of the southern part of the sea is covered by a permanent, massive ice shelf field, the Filchner–Ronne Ice Shelf.

The sea is contained within the two overlapping Antarctic territorial claims of Argentine Antarctica, the British Antarctic Territory, and also resides partially within the Antarctic Chilean Territory. At its widest the sea is around 2,000 kilometres (1,200 mi) across, and its area is around 2.8 million square kilometres (1.1×10^{6} sq mi).

Various ice shelves, including the Filchner–Ronne Ice Shelf, fringe the Weddell sea. Some of the ice shelves on the east side of the Antarctic Peninsula, which formerly covered roughly 10,000 square kilometres (3,900 sq mi) of the Weddell Sea, had completely disappeared by 2002. The Weddell Sea has been deemed by scientists to have the clearest water of any sea. Researchers from the Alfred Wegener Institute, on finding a Secchi disc visible at a depth of 80 metres (260 ft) on 13 October 1986, ascertained that the clarity corresponded to that of distilled water.

In his 1950 book The White Continent, historian Thomas R. Henry writes: "The Weddell Sea is, according to the testimony of all who have sailed through its berg-filled waters, the most treacherous and dismal region on Earth. The Ross Sea is relatively peaceful, predictable, and safe." He continues for an entire chapter, relating myths of the green-haired merman sighted in the sea's icy waters, the inability of crews to navigate a path to the coast until 1949, and treacherous "flash freezes" that left ships, such as Ernest Shackleton's Endurance, at the mercy of the ice floes.

== Etymology ==
The sea is named after the Scottish sailor James Weddell (1787-1834), who entered the sea in 1823 and originally named it after King George IV; it was renamed in Weddell's honour in 1900. Also in 1823, the American sealing captain Benjamin Morrell claimed to have seen land some 10–12° east of the sea's actual eastern boundary. He called this New South Greenland, but its existence was disproved when the sea was more fully explored in the early 20th century. Morrell got as far south as 74°S; the furthest southern penetration since Weddell but before the modern era was made by William Speirs Bruce in 1903.

The Weddell Sea is an important area of deep water mass formation through cabbeling, the main driving force of the thermohaline circulation. Deepwater masses are also formed through cabbeling in the North Atlantic and are caused by differences in temperature and salinity of the water. In the Weddell sea, this is brought about mainly by brine exclusion and wind cooling.

== History ==
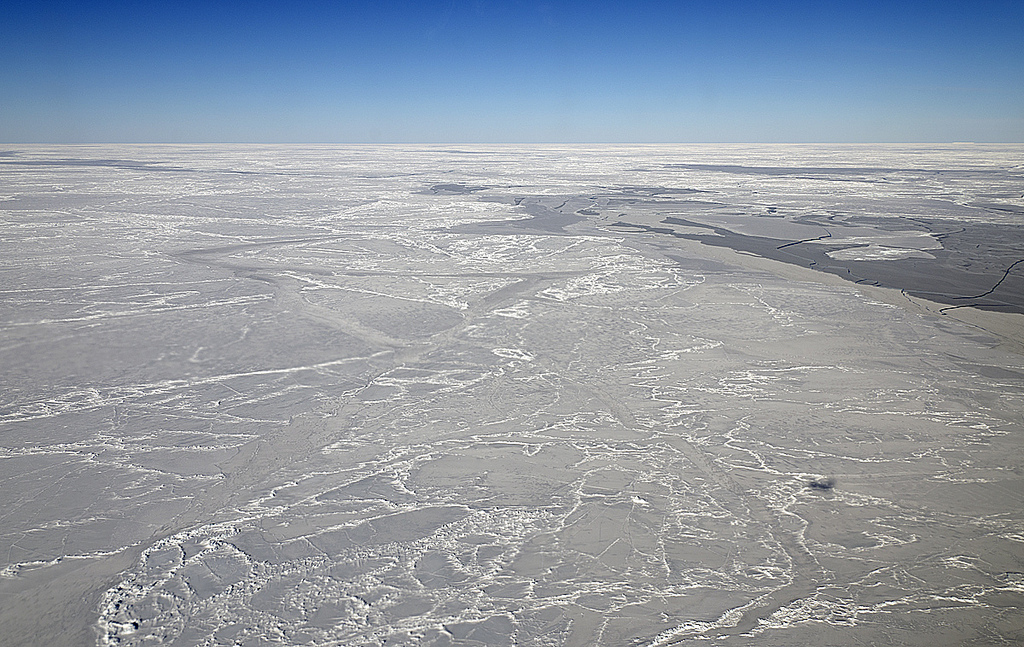
Scarred and chiselled sea ice in the Weddell Sea

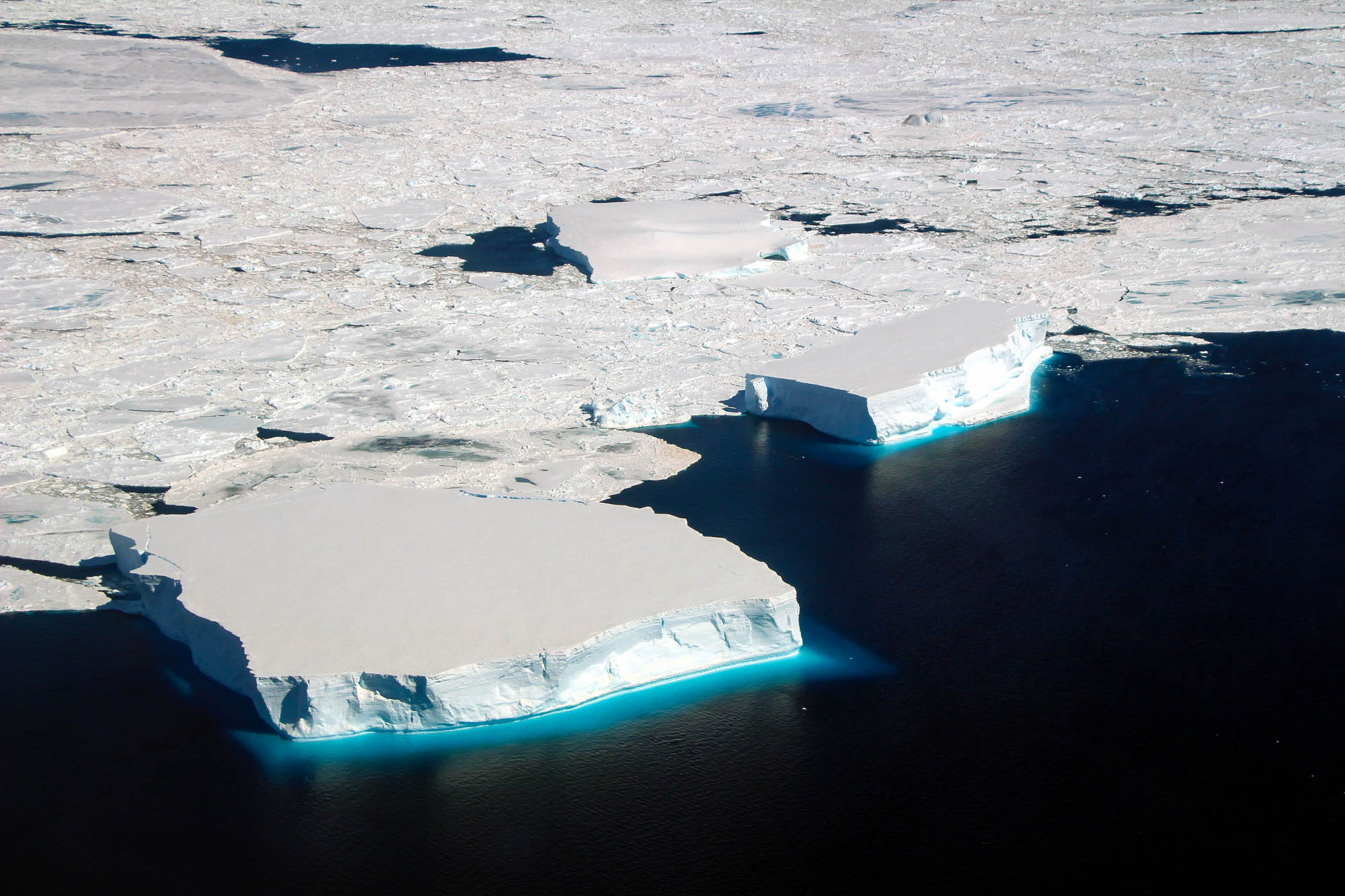

In 1823, British sailor James Weddell discovered the Weddell Sea.

The Antarctic Sound is named after the expedition ship of Otto Nordenskiöld. The sound that separates the tip of the Antarctic Peninsula from Dundee Island is also referred to as "Iceberg Alley", because of the huge icebergs that are often seen here. Snow Hill, located east of the Antarctic Peninsula is almost completely snow-capped, hence its name. The expedition built a cabin on the island in 1902, where Nordenskiöld and three members of the expedition had to spend two winters after his ship was sunk in 1903.

In 1915, Ernest Shackleton's ship, Endurance, also got trapped and was later crushed by ice in this sea. After 15 months on the pack-ice Shackleton and his men managed to reach Elephant Island and safely returned home. In March 2022, it was announced that the well-preserved wreck of the Endurance had been discovered four miles (6.4 km) from its anticipated location, at a depth of 3,008 metres (9,869 ft).

== Geology ==
As with other neighboring parts of Antarctica, the Weddell Sea shares a common geological history with southernmost South America. In southern Patagonia at the onset of the Andean orogeny in the Jurassic extensional tectonics created the Rocas Verdes Basin, a back-arc basin whose surviving southeastward extension forms the Weddell Sea. In the Late Cretaceous the tectonic regime of Rocas Verdes Basin changed leading to its transformation into a compressional foreland basin – the Magallanes Basin – in the Cenozoic. While this happened in South America the Weddell Sea part of the basin escaped compressional tectonics and remained an oceanic basin.

== Oceanography ==
The Weddell Sea is one of few locations in the World Ocean where deep and bottom water masses are formed to contribute to the global thermohaline circulation which has been warming slowly over the last decade. The characteristics of exported water masses result from complex interactions between surface forcing, significantly modified by sea ice processes, ocean dynamics at the continental shelf break, and slope and sub-ice shelf water mass transformation.

Circulation in the western Weddell Sea is dominated by a northward flowing current. This northward current is the western section of a primarily wind-driven, cyclonic gyre called the Weddell Gyre. This northward flow serves as the primary force of departure of water from the Weddell Sea, a major site of ocean water modification and deep water formation, to the remainder of the World Ocean. The Weddell Gyre is a cold, low salinity surface layer separated by a thin, weak pycnocline from a thick layer of relatively warm and salty water referred to as Weddell Deep Water (WDW), and a cold bottom layer.

Circulation in the Weddell Sea has proven difficult to quantify. Geopotential surface heights above the 1000 dB level, computed using historical data, show only very weak surface currents. Similar computations carried out using more closely spaced data also showed small currents. Closure of the gyre circulation was assumed to be driven by Sverdrup transport. The Weddell Sea is a major site for deep water formation.

Thus, in addition to a wind-driven gyre component of the boundary current, a deeper circulation whose dynamics and transports reflect an input of dense water in the southern and southwestern Weddell Sea are expected. Available data does not lend to the quantification of the volume transports associated with this western boundary region, or to the determination of deep convective circulation along the western boundary.

== Climate ==
The predominance of strong surface winds parallel to the narrow and tall mountain range of the Antarctic Peninsula is a remarkable feature of weather and climate in the area of the western Weddell Sea. The winds carry cold air toward lower latitudes and turn into southwesterlies farther north.

These winds are of interest not only because of their effect on the temperature regime east of the peninsula but also because they force the drift of ice northeastward into the South Atlantic Ocean as the last branch of the clockwise circulation in the lower layers of the atmosphere along the coasts of the Weddell Sea. The sharp contrast between the wind, temperature, and ice conditions of the two sides of the Antarctic Peninsula has been well known for many years.

Strong surface winds directed equatorward along the east side of the Antarctic Peninsula can appear in two different types of synoptic-meteorological situations: an intense cyclone over the central Weddell Sea, a broad east to west flow of stable cold air in the lowest 500-to-1000-metre layer of the atmosphere over the central and/or southern Weddell Sea toward the peninsula. These conditions lead to cold air piling up on the east edge of the mountains. This process leads to the formation of a high-pressure ridge over the peninsula (mainly east of the peak) and, therefore, a deflection of the originally westward current of air to the right, along the mountain wall.

== Ecology ==
The Weddell Sea is abundant with whales and seals. Characteristic fauna of the sea include the Weddell seal and killer whales, humpback whales, minke whales, leopard seals, and crabeater seals are frequently seen during Weddell Sea voyages.

The Adélie penguin is the dominant penguin species in this remote area because of their adaptation to the harsh environment. A colony of more than 100,000 pairs of Adélies can be found on volcanic Paulet Island.

Around 1997, the northernmost emperor penguin colony was discovered just south of Snowhill Island in the Weddell Sea. As the Weddell Sea is often clogged with heavy pack-ice, strong ice-class vessels equipped with helicopters are required to reach this colony.

In 2021, sponges and other unidentified suspension feeders were reported to have been found growing under the Filchner–Ronne Ice Shelf on a boulder at a depth of 1,233 m (872 of which were ice), 260 km from open water.

In February 2021 the Alfred Wegener Institute for Polar and Marine Research with RV Polarstern, a colony of approximately 60 million Jonah's icefish was found to inhabit an area in the Weddell Sea. It is estimated that the colony covers around 240 square kilometers, with an average of one nest per every three square meters.

== Seabed features ==
- Albert Bank
- Behm Bank
- Belgrano Bank
- Berkner Bank
- Helmert Bank
- Vinci Bank
- Andenes Knoll
- Explora Knoll
- Polarstern Knoll
- Hofmann Trough
- Möller Trough
- Rinner Trough
