= New South Greenland =

Antarctic island previously believed to exist

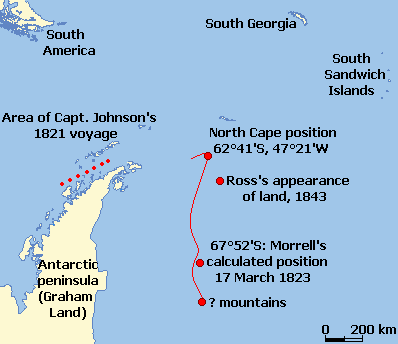
Map showing Morrell's reported location of the "New South Greenland" coast (1823, red line), and "Ross's Appearance" as reported by Sir James Clark Ross in 1841. The dotted line indicates the area of Captain Johnson's 1821 voyage.

New South Greenland, sometimes known as Morrell's Land, was an appearance of land recorded by the American captain Benjamin Morrell of the schooner Wasp in March 1823, during a sealing and exploration voyage in the Weddell Sea area of Antarctica. Morrell provided precise coordinates and a description of a coastline which he claimed to have sailed along for more than 300 miles (500 km). Because the Weddell Sea area was so little visited and hard to navigate due to ice conditions, the alleged land was never properly investigated before its existence was emphatically disproven during Antarctic expeditions in the early 20th century.

At the time of Morrell's voyage, the geography of the then-unnamed Weddell Sea and its surrounding coasts was almost entirely unknown, making the claimed sighting initially plausible. However, obvious errors in Morrell's voyage account and his general reputation as a fabulist created scepticism about the existence of this new land. In June 1912, the German explorer Wilhelm Filchner searched for but found no traces of land after his ship Deutschland became icebound in the Weddell Sea and drifted into the locality of Morrell's observation. A line sounding of the sea bottom revealed more than 5,000 feet (1,500 m) of water, indicating no land in near proximity. Three years later, trapped in the same waters with his ship Endurance, Ernest Shackleton was able by similar means to confirm the land's implausibility.

Various explanations for Morrell's error have been suggested, including intentional deception. However, Morrell describes his find briefly and prosaically, evidently seeking no personal credit or glory from the discovery. In his narrative, he assigns the honour to his fellow sealing captain, Robert Johnson, for finding and naming the land two years earlier. Morrell may have been honestly mistaken, through miscalculation of his ship's position (the reported coastline does roughly match the shape of the nearest real one, but offset by a large distance) or by misremembering detail when writing the account after nine years. Alternatively, he may have made the common error of confusing distant icebergs with land, or been misled by the distorting effects of Antarctic mirage. In 1843, British naval explorer James Clark Ross reported possible land in a position close to Morrell's; this land, too, would eventually be proven not to exist.

== Voyage of the Wasp, 1822–23 ==
=== June 1822 to March 1823 ===
In the early 19th century, the geography of Antarctica was almost completely unknown, though occasional sightings of land had been recorded. In 1822, Benjamin Morrell, who had sailed to the South Sandwich Islands the previous year, was appointed commander of the schooner Wasp for a two-year voyage of sealing, trading and exploration in the Antarctic seas and the southern Pacific Ocean. In addition to his sealing duties, Morrell had, as he put it, "discretionary powers to prosecute new discoveries." He proposed to use this discretion to investigate the Antarctic seas "and to ascertain the practicality ... of penetrating to the South Pole." This would be the first of four extended voyages that would keep Morrell at sea for most of the following eight years, although he would not revisit the Antarctic after the initial voyage.

Wasp sailed south from New York on 22 June 1822. She reached the Falkland Islands late in October, after which Morrell spent 16 days in fruitless searches for the nonexistent Aurora Islands, before heading for South Georgia, where the ship anchored on 20 November. In his account, Morrell wrongly records the position of this anchorage, giving a location in open sea about 60 miles (100 km) south-west of the island's coastline. According to Morrell's account, Wasp then headed eastwards to hunt for seals, and reached the remote Bouvet Island on 6 December. The polar historian Hugh Robert Mill notes that Morrell's description of this island's physical features fails to mention its most singular characteristic—the permanent ice sheet that covers its surface. Morrell then attempted to take the ship southwards but, reaching thick ice at around 60°S, turned northeast towards the Kerguelen Islands where he anchored on 31 December.

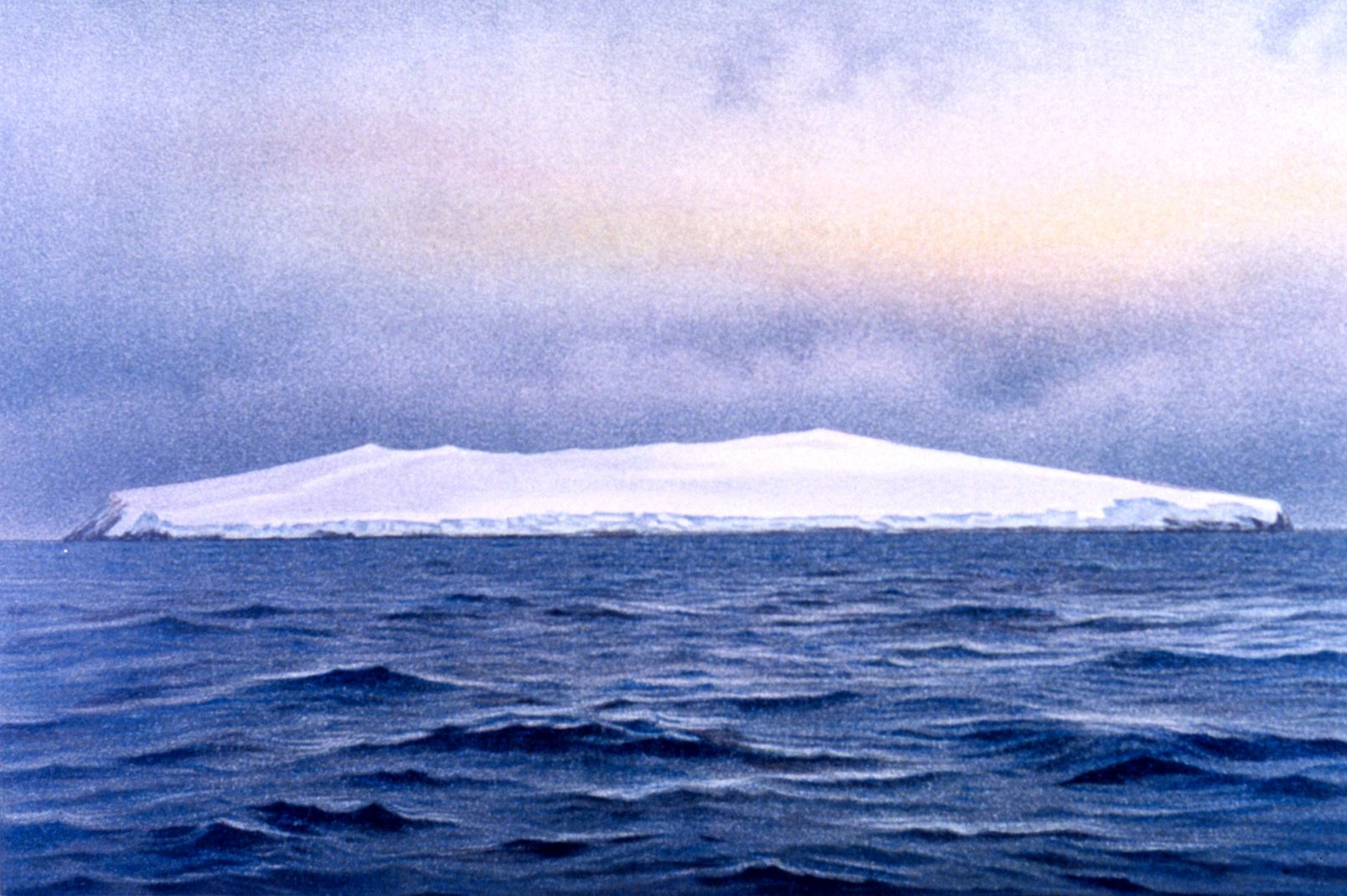
Bouvet Island, which Morrell claimed to have reached on 6 December 1822

After several days of exploration (and, evidently, profitable sealing), Wasp left the Kerguelens on 11 January 1823, sailing south and east to record her furthest eastern position at 64°52'S, 118°27'E on 1 February. From this point, according to his own account, Morrell decided to take advantage of strong easterly winds, and made passage westward back to the Greenwich meridian, 0°. His subsequent account of this voyage has been disputed, particularly his assertion that a distance of more than 3,500 miles (5,600 km) was covered in 23 days. The writer Rupert Gould points out that, according to Morrell's record, this journey included a stretch of 900 miles (1,400 km) in four days, a rate of progress that even Gould, generally sympathetic to Morrell, is inclined to doubt. Morrell quotes various positions during the voyage at southerly latitudes which later proved to be at least 100 miles inside the then undiscovered Antarctic continental mainland. One possible explanation for this discrepancy, offered by the writer W.J. Mills, is that since Morrell's account was written nine years after the voyage he may not have had access to the ship's log, and hence "felt constrained to invent details that appeared plausible", in order to sustain his narrative.

On 28 February, Wasp reached Candlemas Island in the South Sandwich Islands. After a few days spent in a search for fuel to feed the ship's stoves, Morrell sailed southwards on 6 March, into the area later known as the Weddell Sea. Finding the sea remarkably free of ice, Morrell advanced to 70°14'S before turning north-westward on 14 March. This retreat, Morrell says, was due to the ship's lack of fuel; otherwise, he claims, in these open waters he could have taken the ship to 85°, or perhaps to the Pole itself. These words are very similar to those used by the British explorer James Weddell to describe his own experiences in the same area, a month earlier, which has led historians to suspect that Morrell may have plagiarised Weddell's experiences.

=== Sighting of land ===
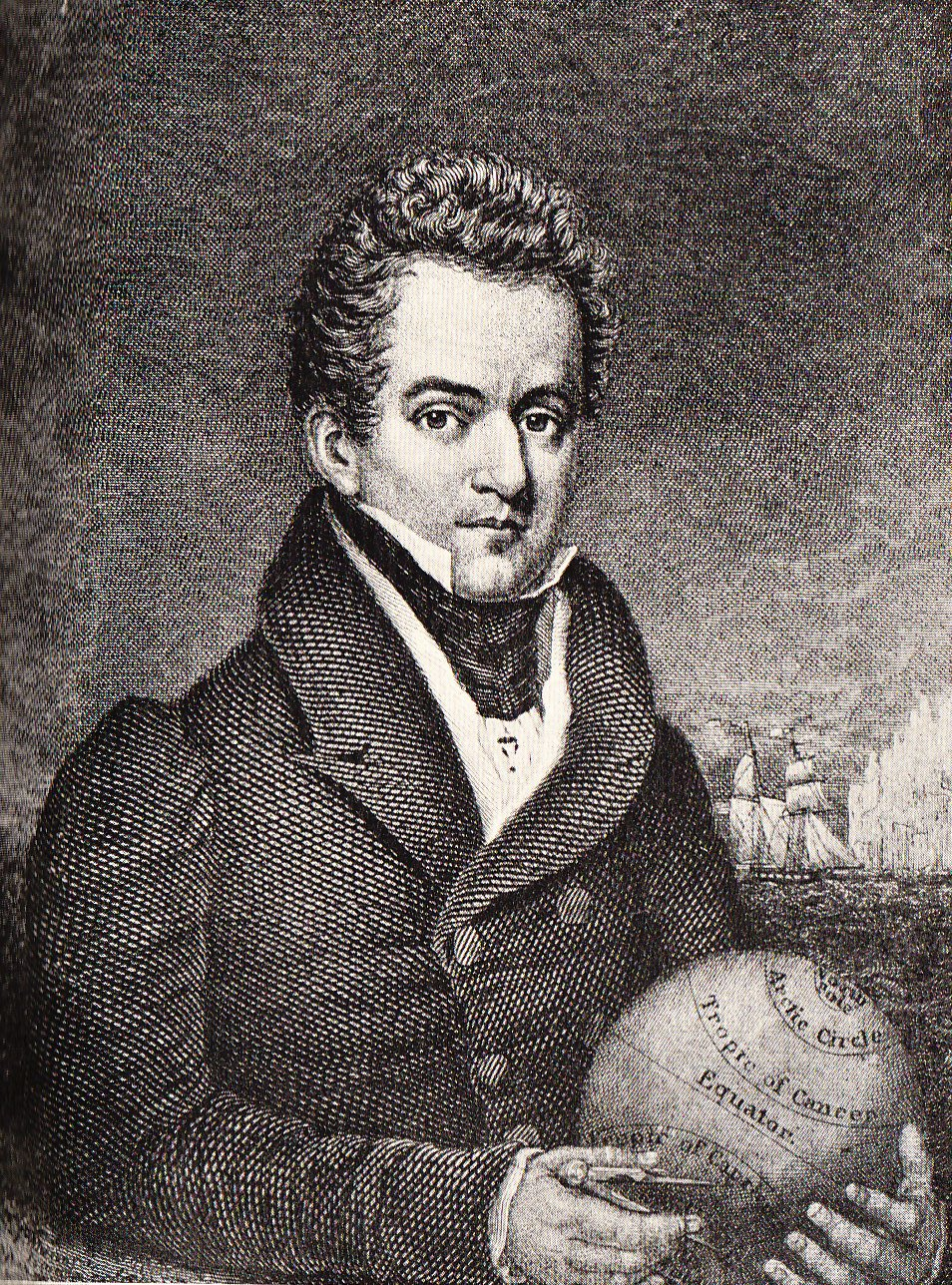
Engraving of Benjamin Morrell from 1832

From the earliest navigations of the Southern Ocean in the 16th century, lands which subsequently proved to be nonexistent had from time to time been reported. Robert Headland of the Scott Polar Research Institute has suggested various reasons for these false sightings, ranging from "too much rum" to deliberate hoaxes designed to lure rival ships away from good sealing grounds. Some sightings may have been of large ice masses that were carrying rocks and other glacial debris—dirty ice can appear convincingly similar to land. It is also possible that some of these lands existed, but later became submerged after volcanic eruptions. Other sightings may have been of actual land, the position of which was wrongly fixed through observational errors arising from chronometer failure, adverse weather or simple incompetence.

At 2 pm on 15 March, as Wasp cruised north-eastwards, Morrell records: "Land was seen from the masthead, bearing west, distance 3 leagues" (about nine miles, 14 km). He did not at the time consider that he had made a new discovery; he seems to have assumed that he was seeing the east coast of the Antarctic Peninsula, the western coast of which had been explored and given the name New South Greenland in 1821, by Robert Johnson, a former captain of the Wasp. Johnson's name for this land was never adopted; in 1831 it was named Graham Land. At the time of Morrell's voyage, the geographical character and dimensions of the peninsula were unknown; Morrell's recorded position was in fact far to the east of the peninsula. Morrell's account reads: "At half past 4 pm we were close on with the body of land to which Captain Johnson had given the name of New South Greenland". The next few days were spent exploring this supposed coast, which was apparently rich in seal. Some 75 miles (120 km) further south, Morrell thought he could see snow-covered mountains.

After three days, Morrell called a halt "because of shortage of water and season far advanced". Wasp turned north, from a position Morrell calculated as 67°52'S, 48°11'W, and on 19 March, the ship passed what he assumed was the northern cape of the land, at 62°41'S, 47°21'W. "This land abounds with oceanic birds of every description", wrote Morrell. He also records seeing 3,000 sea elephants. At 10 o'clock Wasp "bade farewell to the cheerless shores of New South Greenland", and sailed for Tierra del Fuego, then through the Magellan Strait into the Pacific Ocean, reaching Valparaíso, Chile, on 26 July 1823.

== Searches for Morrell's land ==
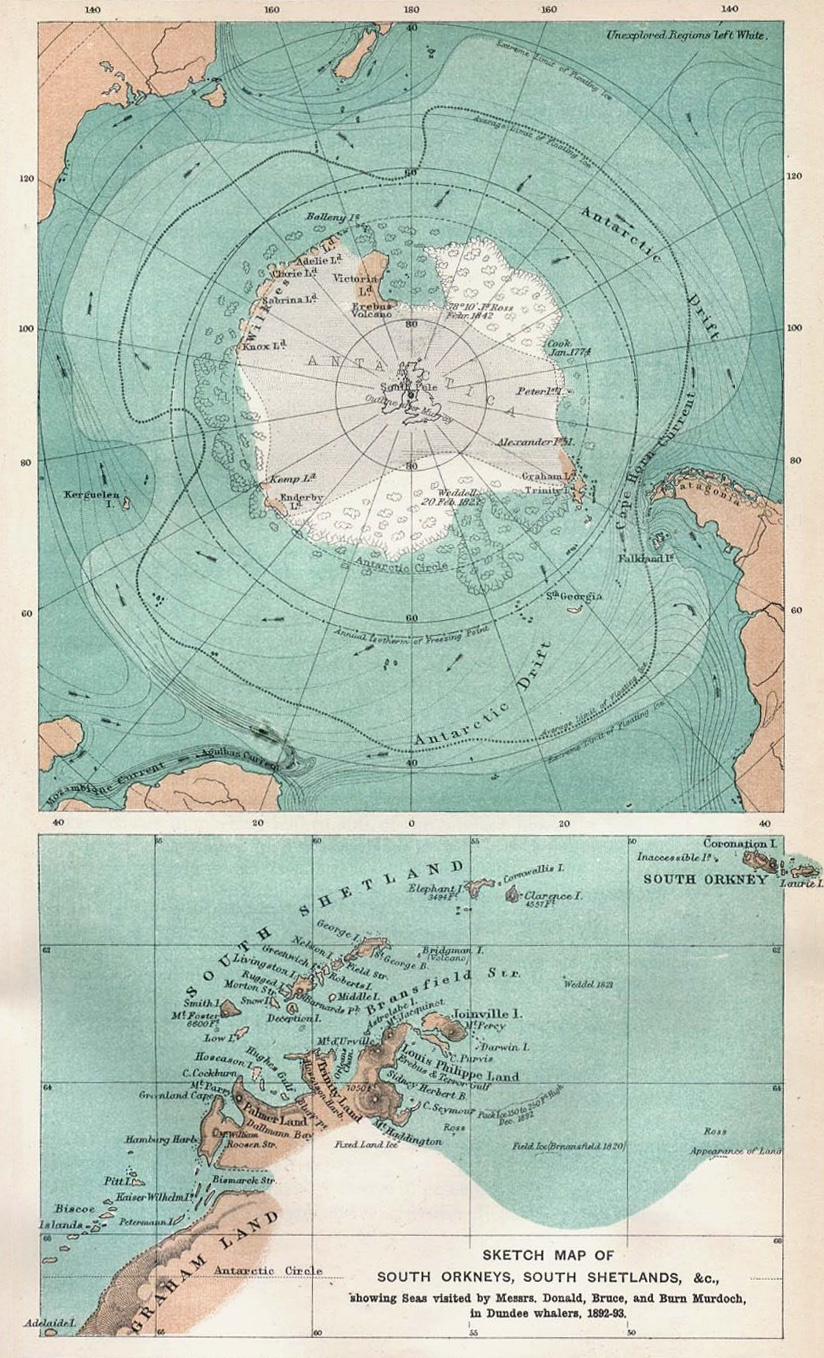
1894 maps of Antarctic regions showing the limited knowledge of Antarctic geography 70 years after Morrell. The lower map marks Ross's Appearance, but not New South Greenland

In 1838, the French explorer Jules Dumont d'Urville sailed over the position of Morrell's "north cape", but saw no indication of land. This, together with the obvious errors in Morrell's voyage account, and his general reputation as a braggart, led most later geographers to doubt his story. This scepticism remained even after Sir James Clark Ross reported an appearance of land in 1843, not far from Morrell's alleged observation; Ross's sighting was occasionally proffered as support for Morrell's claim. After Ross there was no further exploration of the Weddell Sea until 1903, when William Speirs Bruce took Scotia to 74°1'S, but in a sector of the sea which did not bring him close to Morrell's or Ross's supposed sightings. Bruce, however, did not dismiss Morrell's claims, writing that they should not be rejected until absolutely disproved.

The first determined search for New South Greenland came during the Second German Antarctic Expedition, 1911–13, under Wilhelm Filchner. The expedition's ship, Deutschland, became trapped in heavy sea ice while attempting to establish a shore base at Vahsel Bay. Her subsequent north-westerly drift had, by mid-June 1912, brought her to a position just 37 miles (60 km) east of Morrell's recorded sighting. Filchner left the ship on 23 June and, with two companions and sufficient provisions for three weeks, sledged westward across the sea ice in search of Morrell's land. Daylight was limited to two or three hours a day, and temperatures fell to −35 °C (−31 °F), making travel difficult. They found no signs of land; a lead weight dropped through the ice reached a depth of 5,248 feet (1,600 m) before the line snapped. The depth confirmed that there was no land in the vicinity, and Filchner concluded that Morrell had probably seen a mirage.

On 17 August 1915 Sir Ernest Shackleton's ship Endurance, trapped in the ice like Deutschland three years earlier, drifted to a point 10 miles west of Morrell's sighting. Here, a depth sounding recorded 1,676 fathoms (10,060 feet, 3,065 m), leading Shackleton to write: "I decided that Morrell Land must be added to the long list of Antarctic islands and continental coasts that have resolved themselves into icebergs". On 25 August a further sounding of 1,900 fathoms (11,400 feet, 3,500 m) gave Shackleton additional evidence of the non-existence of New South Greenland.

Although Filchner's and Shackleton's investigations and observations were accepted as conclusive proof that New South Greenland was a myth, there remained the question of Sir James Ross's reported appearance of land in a position around 65°S, 47°W. Ross's reputation was sufficient for this possibility to be taken seriously, and for his alleged sighting to be recorded on maps and Admiralty charts. In 1922 Frank Wild, leading the Shackleton–Rowett Expedition aboard Quest after Shackleton's death early in the expedition, investigated the location of Ross's sighting. Nothing was seen; prevented by ice conditions from reaching the exact spot, Wild took a sounding at 64°11'S, 46°4'W, which revealed 2,331 fathoms (13,986 ft; 4,263 m) of water. This showed that no land was near.

== Opinions and theories ==
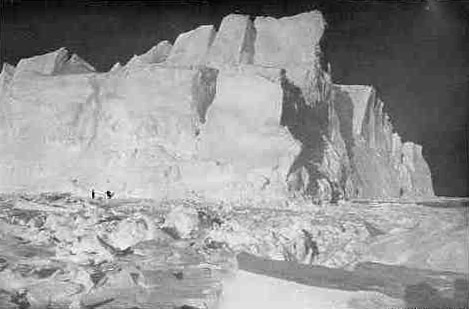
Weddell Sea iceberg in the region of "New South Greenland", Endurance expedition August 1915. Shackleton observed how land appearances frequently resolved into icebergs.

Hugh Robert Mill, writing in 1905 before the non-existence of New South Greenland had been finally established, concluded that because of Morrell's blunders, and his habit of incorporating the experiences of others into his story, all his claims should be treated as unproven. Nevertheless, he conceded that "a man may be ignorant, boastful and obscure, and yet have done a solid piece of work". The Canadian geographer Paul Simpson-Housley, although sceptical about much of Morrell's account, suggests that the speeds claimed for the derided western journey, though fast, were not impossible, and Morrell's farthest south in the Weddell Sea, queried by Mill, is entirely plausible, given that James Weddell had sailed four degrees further south just a month earlier.

The writer Rupert Gould, in a lengthy essay on New South Greenland published in 1929, queries the assumption that the sighting was simply invented by Morrell, partly on the grounds that very little weight is given to the discovery in Morrell's 500-page account. Gould writes: "If Morrell wished to gain an undeserved reputation as an Antarctic explorer, one would think he could have gone a better way about it than to bury his pièces justificatives, after he had forged them, in an undistinguished corner of so bulky a book." Nor would he have credited it to Captain Johnson two years earlier, rather than to himself.

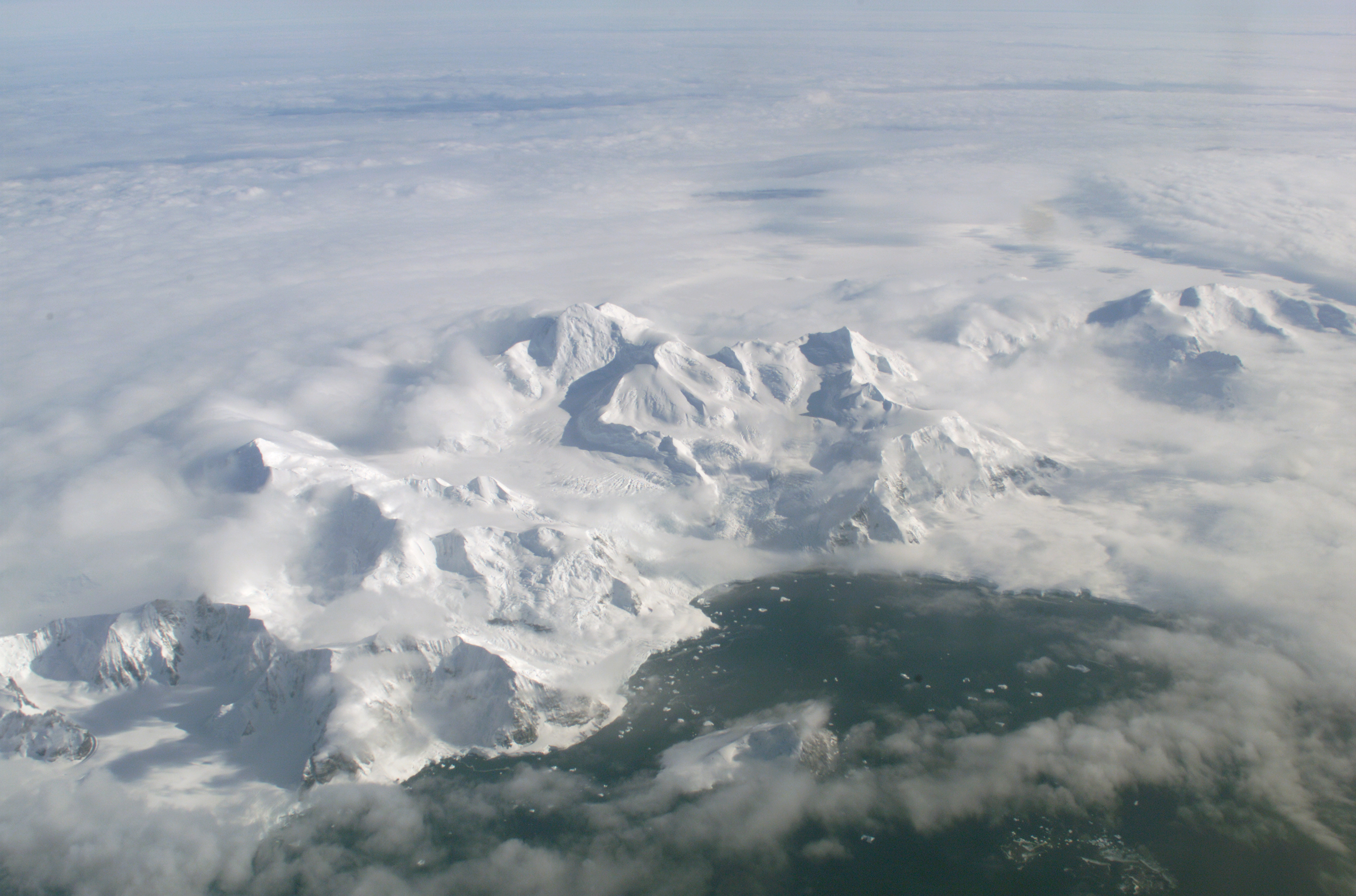
The Larsen Ice Shelf, on the eastern coast of the Antarctic peninsula

Gould also discusses the possibility that what Morrell sighted was the eastern coast of Graham Land, the so-called "Foyn Coast", despite its being 14° further west from the position of the New South Greenland sighting. Gould asserts that the features of the peninsula's eastern coast correspond closely with Morrell's description of New South Greenland. This theory supposes that Morrell miscalculated the ship's position, perhaps because he lacked the chronometer necessary for proper navigational observation. In his account, Morrell writes that he was "destitute of the various nautical and mathematical instruments", although other parts of his narrative seem to indicate that the occasional dead reckoning calculation was the exception to the norm. A longitudinal error of 14° is very large, and the additional distance of about 350 miles (560 km) to the Foyn Coast seems too great to have been covered within the ten-day voyage from the South Sandwich Islands, where the ship's position is recorded accurately. Even so, Gould suggests that a "balance of evidence" shows that what Morrell saw was the Foyn Coast.

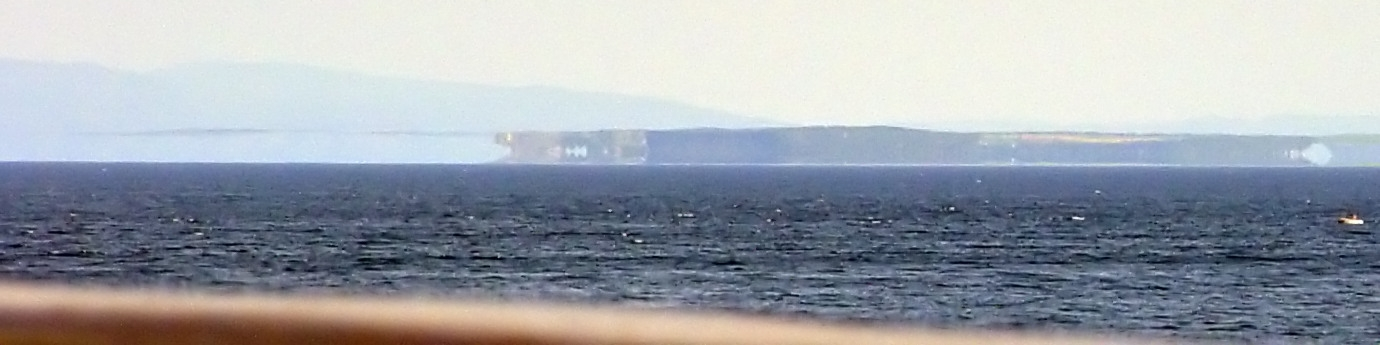
An example of a Fata Morgana, a form of superior mirage, which distorts ice or distant coastlines so they might appear as islands with tall cliffs.

Filchner's view that the supposed sighting of New South Greenland could be explained by a mirage is echoed by Simpson-Housley. He suggests that Morrell and his crew saw a superior mirage. One form of superior mirage, sometimes described as a Fata Morgana, distorts distant flat coastlines or ice edges both vertically and horizontally, so they can appear to have tall cliffs and other features such as high mountain peaks and valleys. In his expedition account South, Shackleton gives a description of a Fata Morgana observed on 20 August 1915, coincidentally as his ship Endurance drifted close to the recorded position of New South Greenland: "The distant pack is thrown up into towering barrier-like cliffs, which are reflected in blue lakes and lanes of water at their base. Great white and golden cities of Oriental appearance at close intervals along these cliff-tops indicate distant bergs ... The lines rise and fall, tremble, dissipate, and reappear in an endless transformation scene".

== Afterwards ==
Morrell's four voyages finally ended on 21 August 1831, with his return to New York. He then wrote his Narrative of Four Voyages, which was published the following year. He attempted to resume his seafaring career, seeking employment with the London-based shipping firm of Enderby Brothers, but his reputation had preceded him and he was rejected. Charles Enderby stated publicly that "he had heard so much of him that he did not think fit to enter into any engagement with him." Morrell also sought to join Dumont D'Urville's expedition to the Weddell Sea in 1837, but his services were again declined. He reportedly died in 1839, and is commemorated by Morrell Island, 59°27'S, 27°19'W, an alternative name for Thule Island in the Southern Thule sub-group of the South Sandwich Islands. Robert Johnson, who coined the name New South Greenland, disappeared with his ship in 1826, while investigating the Antarctic waters in the vicinity of what would later be known as the Ross Sea.
