= Byers's Island =

Phantom island in the Pacific Ocean

Coordinates: 28°32′N 177°04′E

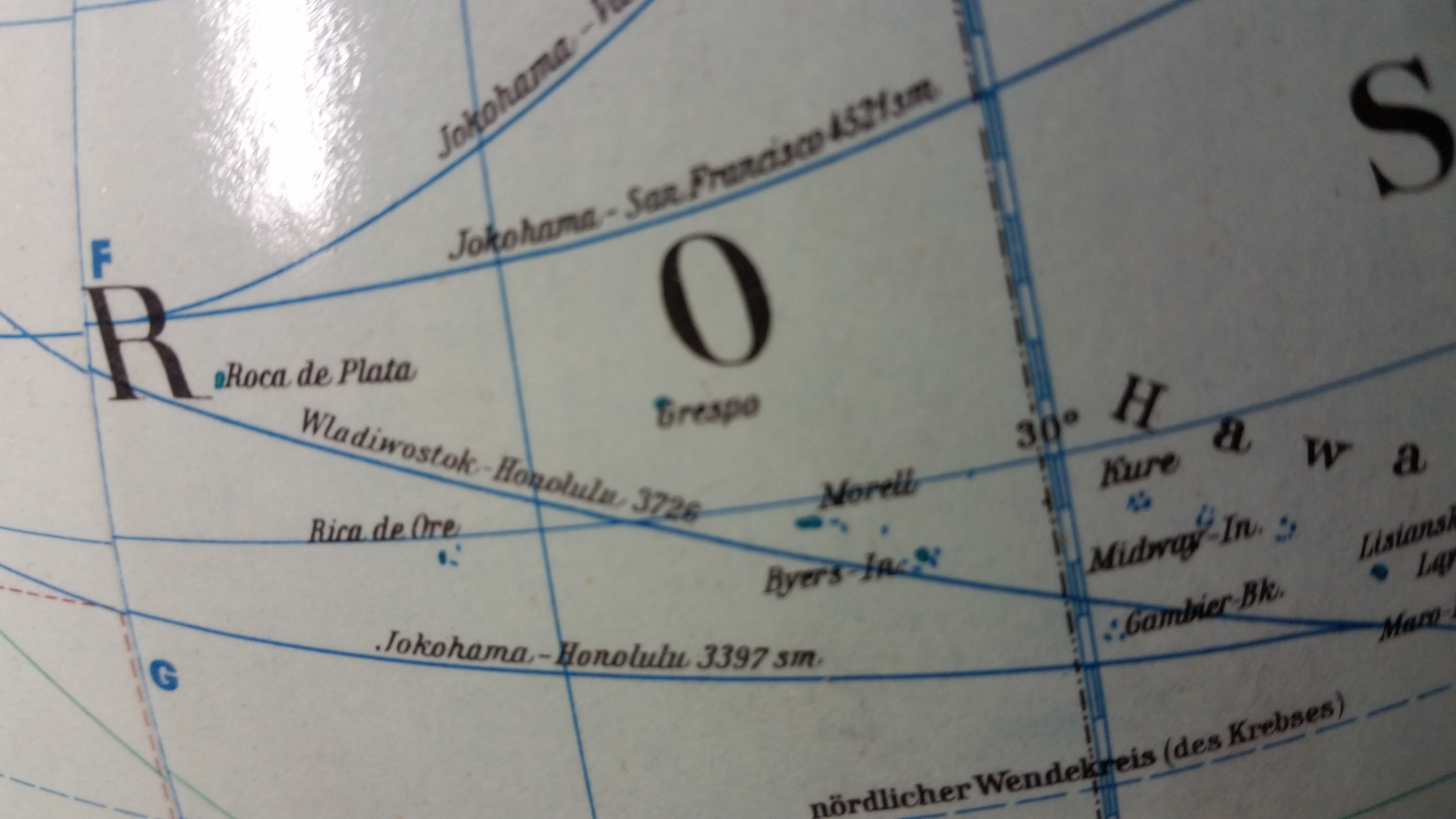
Byers Island along with other phantom islands northwest of Hawaii on a JRO globe around 1960

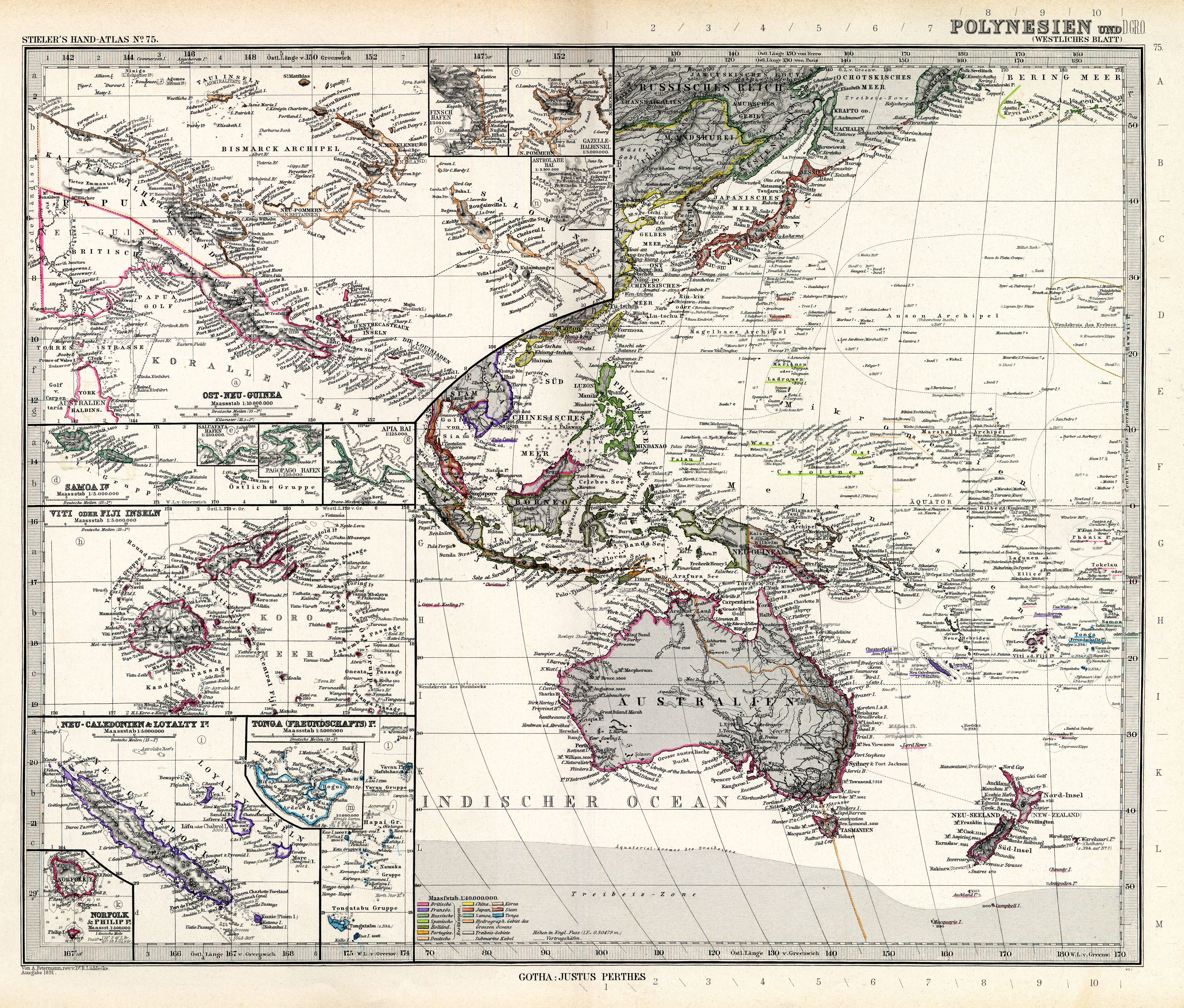
Byer or Patrocinio in Stieler's Handatlas from 1891; northwest of it Morell, each with question marks

Byers's Island is a phantom island reported by Captain Benjamin Morrell in his 1832 book A Narrative of Four Voyages.

== History ==
The island was first reported by Benjamin Morrell in his 1832 book A Narrative of Four Voyages, which recounts his various journeys across the high seas between 1822-1831. Morrell writes that he landed on an island he called "Byers's Island", on 12th July 1825. According to Morrell, this island was located at 28°32'N latitude, 177°4'E longitude, and is "about four miles in circumference", "moderately elevated", and features "some bushes and spots of vegetation".

Following publication, the island falsely appeared in various maps and atlases throughout the 1800s. Stielers Handatlas from 1891 depicts two islands, labeled Byer od. Patrocinio, and Morell, followed by question marks, suggesting that the island's existence was known to be dubious. A maritime manual in 1899 lists Byers's and Morell Island as doubtful.

Some globes continued to display the island, along with other phantom islands in the Pacific, as late as the 1960s.

== Source ==
The origin of Byers's Island is unknown. While A Narrative of Four Voyages was published under Morell's name, it was potentially ghostwritten by magazine editor Samuel Woodworth. As a result, it is unclear whether Morrell or Woodworth was the originator. The name of the island, "Byers", matches that of Morell's employer and ship owner, and as such this is the likely origin for the name.

== Reference works ==
- Stommel, Henry (1984). Lost Islands: The Story of Islands That Have Vanished from Nautical Charts. Vancouver: University of British Columbia Press, pp 98–99. ISBN 0-7748-0210-3.

== See also ==
- Kure Atoll (the westernmost island of the Hawaiian chain)
- Hawaiian–Emperor seamount chain
