= Möller Trough =

Geologic feature in the Southern Ocean

The Möller Trough (76°35′S 30°40′W) is an undersea trough in the Weddell Sea named for the geodesist Dietrich Möller, former president of the German Society for Polar Research. The name was proposed by Heinrich Hinze of the Alfred Wegener Institute for Polar and Marine Research, Bremerhaven, Germany, and it was approved by the Advisory Committee for Undersea Features in June 1997.
