= Anden (disambiguation) =

An andén is a pre-Columbian agricultural terrace.

Anden or Andén may also refer to:

== People ==
- Eva Andén (1886–1970), a Swedish lawyer
- Mathew Anden (1942–1985), German actor
- Mini Andén (b. 1978), Swedish model, actress
- Gwyneth Van Anden Walker (b. 1947), American music educator and composer
- Anders Matthesen (b. 1975), Danish stand-up comedian
- Anden Stavropoulos, character in the 2013 novel Prodigy

== Other uses ==
- Anda, Norway, an island in the Norwegian Sea
- Anden language, a language of West Papua, Indonesia
