= Andenes Church =

Church in Nordland, Norway

- Andenes kirke
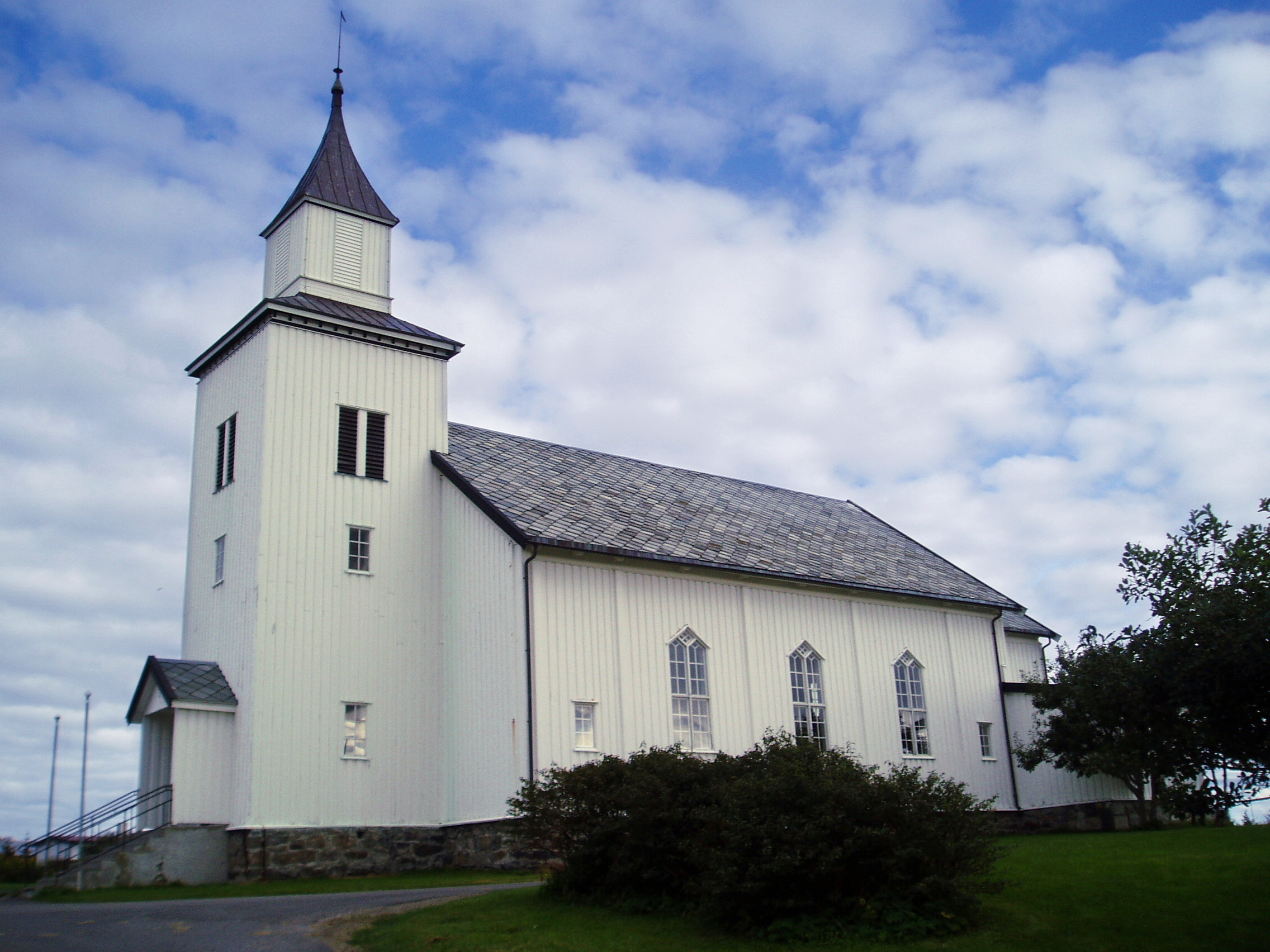
- View of the church
- Andenes Church
- 69.3184891°N 16.1267522°E
- Location: Andøy Municipality, Nordland
- Country: Norway
- Denomination: Church of Norway
- Churchmanship: Evangelical Lutheran

History
- Status: Parish church
- Founded: 1734
- Consecrated: 30 June 1876

Architecture
- Functional status: Active
- Architect: Ingebrigt Julin
- Architectural type: Long church
- Completed: 1876 (150 years ago)

Specifications
- Capacity: 400
- Materials: Wood

Administration
- Diocese: Sør-Hålogaland
- Deanery: Vesterålen prosti
- Parish: Andøy
- Norwegian Cultural Heritage Site
- Type: Church
- Status: Listed
- ID: 83780

Andenes Church (Norwegian: Andenes kirke) is a parish church of the Church of Norway in Andøy Municipality in Nordland county, Norway. It is located in the village of Andenes on the northern tip of the island of Andøya. It is one of the churches for the Andøy parish which is part of the Vesterålen prosti (deanery) in the Diocese of Sør-Hålogaland. The white, wooden church was built in a long church style in 1876 by the architect Ingebrigt Julin. The church seats about 400 people.

== History ==
The oldest existing historical records of the church date back to 1589, although the church was not new at that time. Some of inventory of the church dates back to the late 1400s. A church on the site was demolished in 1600 and a new replacement was consecrated in 1607. After more than a century, that church was replaced in 1734. After about 150 years (in 1876), that building was torn down and replaced by a new church (the present church) which was built in a new part of the village, about 400 metres (1,300 ft) southeast of where all the previous churches had been located. This building was consecrated on 30 June 1876 by the Bishop Waldemar Hvoslef.

== Media gallery ==
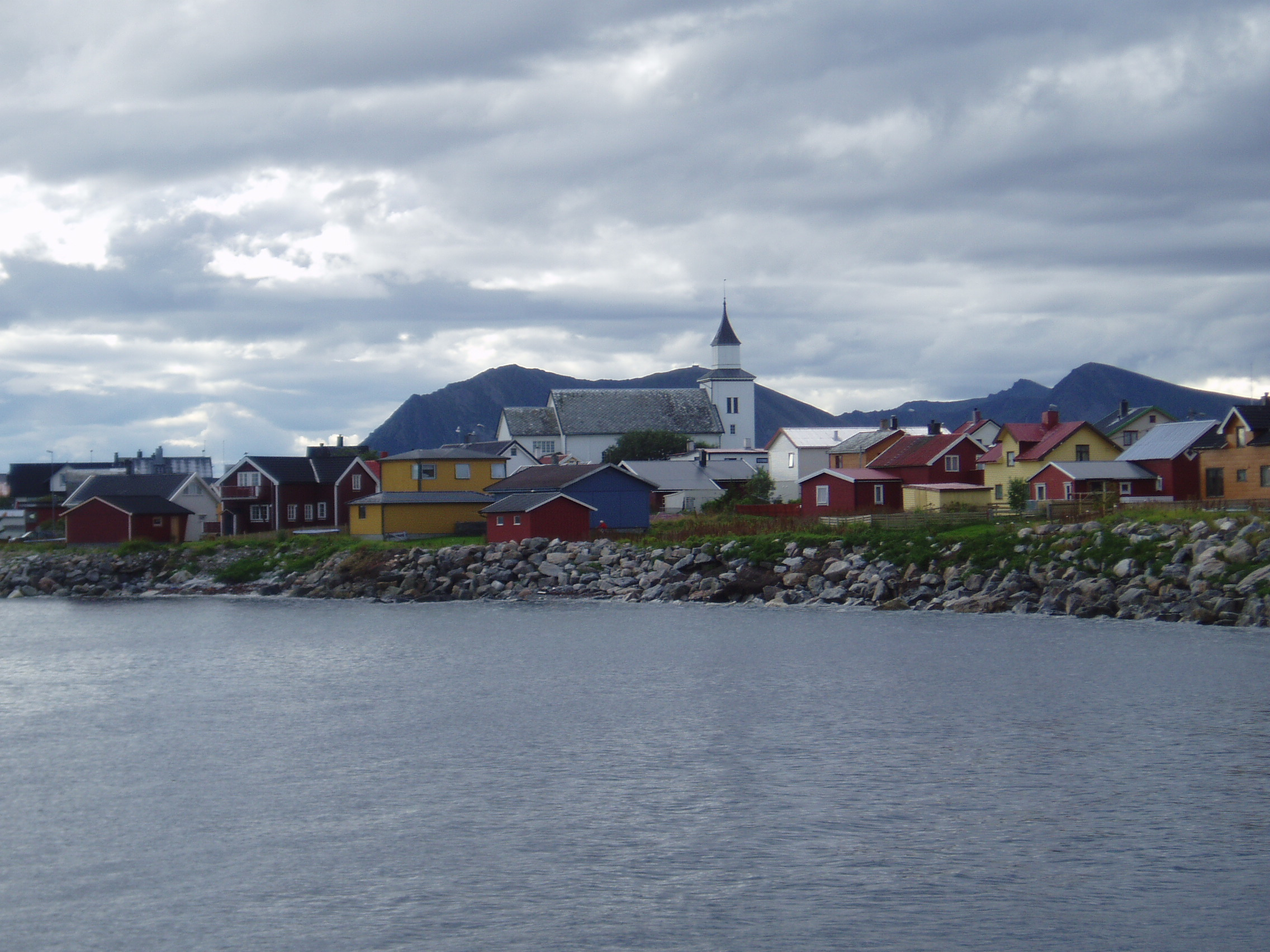

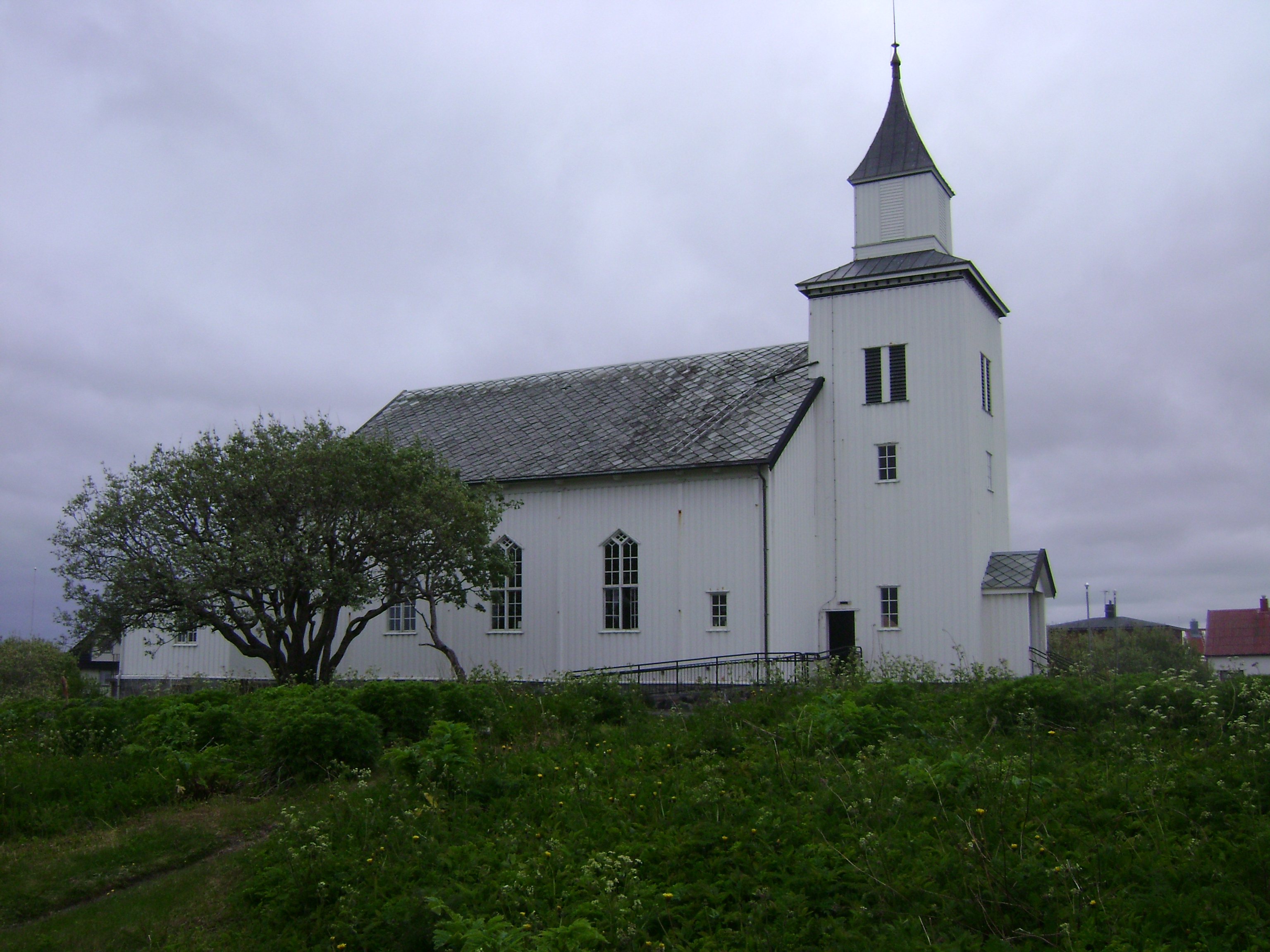

== See also ==
- List of churches in Sør-Hålogaland
