= Explora Phones Inc =

Explora Phones Inc.
- Website type: Telecommunications, Travel
- Headquarters: New York, New York
- Area served: USA
- Owner: Raj Patel
- Website: www.exploraphones.com
- Commercial: Yes
- Launched: November 2013; 12 years ago
- Current status: Defunct

Explora Phones Inc (commonly known as Explora) was an angel funded technology start-up providing telecommunications and electronic tour guide services to international travelers.

== History ==
The company was founded in 2013 by former investment banker Raj Patel and Carl Cochrane with the aim of disrupting the $57 billion global roaming market. Explora was headquartered in Bryant Park, New York.

== Services ==
Explora's main service was a smartphone rental for travelers. Current the service only operates for visitors to the US, but Explora has plans to expand to other geographies.

Users reserve online via the Explora website and are then shipped a Google Nexus 5 smartphone to their hotel or residential address. The service includes unlimited calling, text messaging and 4G LTE data plus over 40 pre-loaded travel related apps. Special offers and benefits are provided by some travel app providers to Explora's customers. For example, Taxi Magic provides $10 off an Explora users first taxi booking. Explora's services are priced on a fixed daily rate basis of US$8.00.
