= Mathew Anden =

German actor (1942–1985)

- Mathew Anden in The Waltons, 1978
- Born: November 23, 1942
- Died: July 19, 1985 (aged 42)

Mathew Anden, also Mathew T. Anden or Matthew Anden (November 23, 1942 in Berlin – 19 July 1985 in New York City) was a German theater, television and film actor, who mainly worked in the United States.

== Life ==
Anden was born in Berlin in 1942 as Mathias Schreiner. He was the son of Katharine Schreiner, but was adopted by his aunt, Yoshi Schreiner. His mother was in a Russian concentration camp and believed to have died in the camp, thus the adoption. However, she returned in 1950, but the adoption was never changed. Anden and his aunt/adoptive mother came to the United States in June 1957. When he became an American citizen, he changed his name to Mathew Anden.

When Anden was a teenager, he developed an interest in acting and was cast in plays. He played in theaters across the United States, in Minneapolis, Maine, New Orleans, Boston, and Detroit, and worked from 1971 to 1972 at a theater of Baltimore, often playing the lead. His most significant role was in the 1965 Off-Broadway production of The Threepenny Opera, in which he played the role of Finch. Throughout his career, he acted alongside such theater stars as Gail Strickland, Joyce Van Patten and Diana Scarwid. He also acted in plays by Harvey Perr, Max Frisch and Seán O'Casey. His career as a stage actor encompassed continuously the 1950s, 60s and 70s in the United States. He was a member of the Actors Studio.

He was not very fond of film acting, and acted in just four movies or feature films throughout his career, though he worked with famous actors such as Paul Newman, Burt Reynolds, Ryan O'Neal and, in German films, Nicole Heesters and Hans-Peter Korff. Anden had a guest role on The Waltons, and appeared on various German crime shows. In one of his few nonfictional television appearances, he was interviewed for the show Making it in Hollywood.

On 19 July 1985, he died at age 42 from the effects of stomach cancer and AIDS.

== US TV appearances ==
- The Patty Duke Show, "Practice Makes Perfect", 1963 (as Eddie Blake).
- Making it in Hollywood (23 June 1976), Issue No. 18, taken at a party in Hollywood producers, documentary (22 minutes).
- The Waltons, "The Rumor" (guest role), 1978 (as Willie Brimmer).

== Filmography ==
- David and Lisa, USA, 1962 (as Simon).
- Nickelodeon, USA, 1976 (as Hecky).
- Flush, Comedy, USA, 1977.
- The Death Springer, (Der Todesspringer), Germany, 1985 (as the son of wealthy parents).

== Theater ==
- The Threepenny Opera, New York City Opera (Off-Broadway), 1965, the role of Finch.
- The Persecution and Assassination of Jean Paul Marat represented by the spectacle of the Asylum of Charenton under the Direction of the Marquis de Sade, (play by Peter Weiss) Performed *Baltimore 1970 (Andean played the lead role).
- Andorra, (Max Frisch), Leading Role, 1972, Baltimore.
- Cock a Doodle Dandy (Seán O'Casey), 1974, in the role of One-Eye Larry.
- Gethsemane Springs, (Harvey Perr), 1977, in the role of David (Gail Strickland, Joyce Van Patten, Diana Scarwid).
- Two Sisters, 1979. (The piece was written by Anden itself) (also actor).
