= Samuel Lorenzo Knapp =

American author, lawyer (1783–1838)

Samual Lorenzo Knapp
- Born: January 19, 1783; Newburyport, Massachusetts
- Died: July 8, 1838 (aged 55); Hopkinton, Massachusetts
- Education: Dartmouth College
- Occupations: Author; Lawyer

Samuel Lorenzo Knapp (19 January 1783 in Newburyport, Massachusetts – 8 July 1838 in Hopkinton, Massachusetts) was an American author and lawyer.

== Biography ==
He graduated from Dartmouth College in 1804, studied law with Chief Justice Theophilus Parsons, and became an eminent lawyer. During the War of 1812, he commanded a regiment of militia on the coast defences. He was a representative in the Massachusetts legislature from 1812 to 1816. Knapp was elected a member of the American Antiquarian Society in 1814. In 1816, he was imprisoned for debt, upon his release from prison in 1817, he moved to Boston.

He became editor of the Boston Gazette in 1824, also conducting the Boston Monthly Magazine. In 1826 he established the National Republican, which failed two years later, and he returned to practicing law in New York City. He was given the degree of LL.D. from the Paris College.

== Works ==
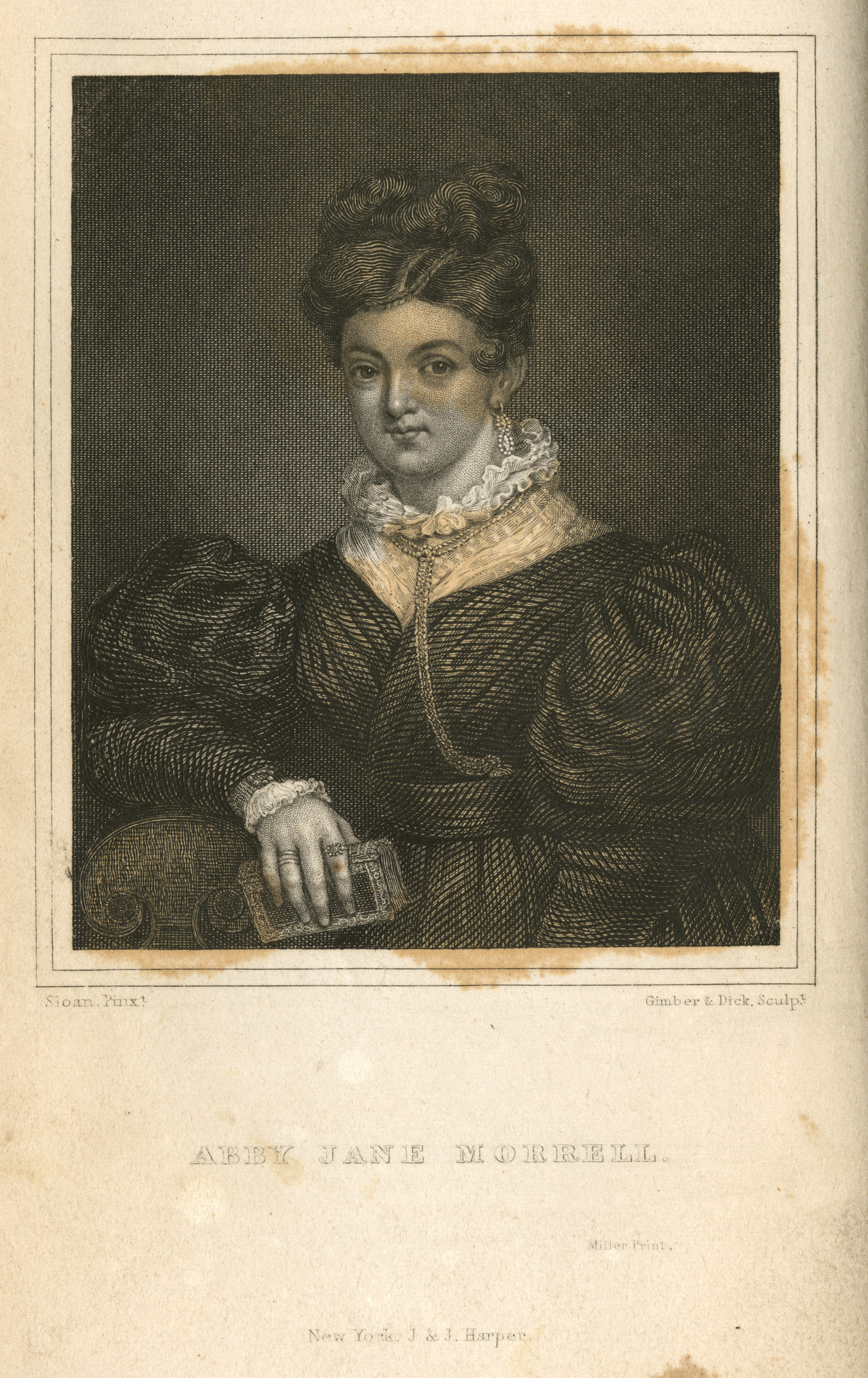
Abby Jane Morrell

Narrative of a voyage to the Ethiopic and South Atlantic Ocean, Indian Ocean, Chinese Sea, North and South Pacific Ocean, in the years 1829, 1830, 1831

His works, which are chiefly biographical, include:

- "Ali Bey," Extracts of a Journal of Travels in North America, consisting of an account of Boston and its vicinity (Boston, 1818). A burlesque imitation of Travels of Ali Bey in Morocco... (Ali Bey in this second work being a pseudonym for Domingo Badia y Leblich; 2 vols., Philadelphia, 1816); Knapp's 1818 work purports to give an oriental traveler's experiences of society in Boston and Cambridge.
- Biographical Sketches of Eminent Lawyers, Statesmen, and Men of Letters (1821)
- Memoirs of Gen. Lafayette (1824)
- The Genius of Freemasonry (Providence, 1828)
- Discourse on the Life and Character of De Witt Clinton (1828)
- Lectures on American Literature (New York, 1829)
- "Ignatius Loyola Robertson," Sketches of Public Characters (1830)
- American Biography (1833)
- Narrative of a Voyage to the Ethiopic and South Atlantic Ocean, Indian Ocean, Chinese Sea, North and South Pacific Oceans, in the Years 1829, 1830, 1831 was published in New York in 1833 by J. & J. Harper. Ghost-written by Knapp it re-told the experience of merchant's wife and explorer Abby Jane Morrell.
- History of the United States, a revised edition of a work by John Hinton (1834)
- Life of Thomas Eddy (1834) at Google Books
- Female biography containing notices of distinguished women in different ages and nations (New York, 1834) at Google Books
- The picturesque beauties of the Hudson River and its vicinity (New York: J. Disturnell, 1835 (pt. I) and 1836 (pt. II)
- Advice in the Pursuit of Literature (1835)
- Memoir of the Life of Daniel Webster (1835)
- Life of Aaron Burr (1835)
- Life of Andrew Jackson (1835)
- The Bachelor, and Other Tales (1836)
- Life of Timothy Dexter (1838) at archive.org (1858 edition)

He edited "The Library of American History" (New York, 1837). He was the author of a variety of occasional public addresses. George Harvey Genzmer, in evaluating his biographies in the Dictionary of American Biography, calls him "ornate, laudatory, and patriotic, and wholly untrustworthy."
