= Marine Geodesy =

- Discipline: Oceanography, Geodesy, Remote sensing
- Language: English
- Edited by: Rongxing (Ron) Li

Publication details
- Publisher: Taylor & Francis
- Impact factor: 1.667 (2020)

Standard abbreviations
- ISO 4: Mar. Geod.

Indexing
- ISSN: 0149-0419 (print); 1521-060X (web)

Links
- Journal homepage

Marine Geodesy is an academic journal published by Taylor & Francis about "ocean surveys, ocean mapping, and remote sensing". Its editor-in-chief is Rongxing (Ron) Li; its 2019 impact factor is 1.322.
