= Polarstern Knoll =

Undersea knoll off the coast of West Antarctica

Polarstern Knoll (71°25′S 24°47′W) is an undersea knoll in the Weddell Sea, named for the German research vessel Polarstern, which took part in 22 expeditions to the Arctic and Antarctic (1982–1995). The name was proposed by Dr. Heinrich Hinze, Alfred Wegener Institute for Polar and Marine Research, Bremerhaven, Germany, and was approved in June 1997 (by Advisory Committee for Undersea Features (ACUF) 271).
