= Explora Knoll =

Undersea knoll off the coast of West Antarctica

Coordinates: 72°0′S 24°0′W

Explora Knoll is an undersea knoll in the Weddell Sea, named for the Antarctic science ship F.S. Explora. The name was proposed by Dr. Heinrich Hinze of the Alfred Wegener Institute for Polar and Marine Research, Bremerhaven, Germany, and was approved by the Advisory Committee for Undersea Features in June 1997.
