= Ocean bank =

Part of the sea which is shallow compared to its surrounding area

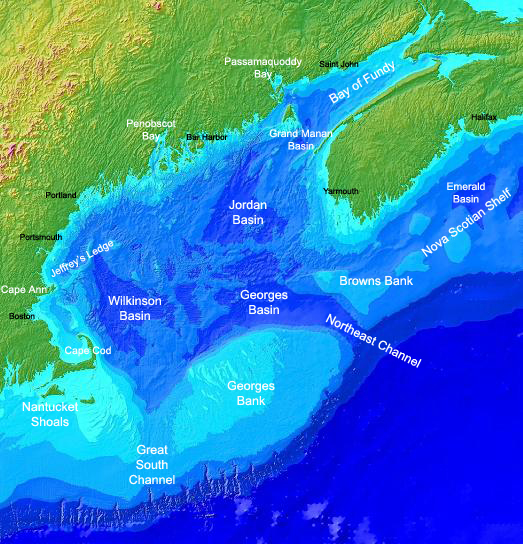
Georges Bank in the Gulf of Maine is a large elevated area of the sea floor, shown in this map as the light blue region at the bottom centre.

An ocean bank, sometimes referred to as a fishing bank or simply bank, is a part of the seabed that is shallow compared to its surrounding area, such as a shoal or the top of an underwater hill. Somewhat like continental slopes, ocean bank slopes can upwell as tidal and other flows intercept them, sometimes resulting in nutrient-rich currents. Because of this, some large banks, such as Dogger Bank and the Grand Banks of Newfoundland, are among the richest fishing grounds in the world.

There are some banks that were reported in the 19th century by navigators, such as Wachusett Reef, whose existence is doubtful.

== Types ==
Ocean banks may be of volcanic nature. Banks may be carbonate or terrigenous. In tropical areas some banks are submerged atolls. As they are not associated with any landmass, banks have no outside source of sediments. Carbonate banks are typically platforms, rising from the ocean depths, whereas terrigenous banks are elevated sedimentary deposits.

Seamounts, by contrast, are mountains rising from the deep sea and are steeper and higher in comparison to the surrounding seabed. Examples of these are Pioneer and Guide Seamounts, west of the Farallon Islands. The Pioneer Seamount has a depth of 1,000 meters, In other cases, parts of a bank may reach above the water surface, thereby forming islands.

== Prominent banks ==
The largest banks in the world are:

1. Grand Banks of Newfoundland (280,000 km^{2}) - terrigenous bank
2. Agulhas Bank (116,000 km^{2})
3. Great Bahama Bank (95,798.12 km^{2}, has islands, area without islands)
4. Saya de Malha (35,000 km^{2}, excluding the separate North bank, least depth 7 m)
5. Seychelles Bank (31,000 km^{2}, including islands of 266 km^{2})
6. Georges Bank (28,800 km^{2}) - terrigenous bank
7. Lansdowne Bank (4,300 km^{2}, west of New Caledonia, least depth 3.7 m)
8. Dogger Bank (17,600 km^{2}, least depth 13 m)
9. Little Bahama Bank (14,260.64 km^{2}, has islands, area without islands)
10. Great Chagos Bank (12,642 km^{2}, including islands of 4.5 km^{2})
11. Reed Bank, Spratly Islands (8,866 km^{2}, least depth 9 m)
12. Caicos Bank, Caicos Islands (7,680 km^{2}, including islands of 589.5 km^{2})
13. Macclesfield Bank (6,448 km^{2}, least depth 9.2 m)
14. North Bank or Ritchie Bank (5,800 km^{2}, north of Saya de Malha, least depth <10 m)
15. Cay Sal Bank (5,226.73 km^{2}, including islands of 14.87 km^{2})
16. Rosalind Bank (4,500 km^{2}, least depth 7.3 m)
17. Bassas de Pedro (2,474.33 km^{2}, least depth 16.4 m), part of the Amindivi Subgroup of Lakshadweep, India

== See also ==
- Oceanic plateau
- Carbonate platform
- Placer (geography)
