= List of Antarctic exploration ships from the Heroic Age, 1897–1922 =

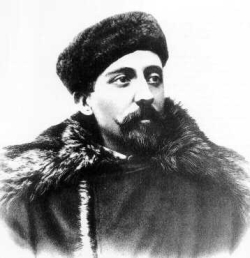
Adrien de Gerlache, who led the first of the "Heroic Age" expeditions

The era between 1897 and 1922 was known as the Heroic Age of Antarctic Exploration. Seventeen expeditions took place during that time; this list includes all the main Antarctic exploration ships that were employed in those expeditions. A subsidiary list gives details of support and relief vessels that played significant roles in the expeditions they were commissioned to support.

The tables do not include the regular whaling voyages that took place during this period, or expeditions such as that of Carl Chun in 1898–1899 in the German vessel Valdiva, which did not penetrate the Antarctic Circle. The abortive Cope Expedition of 1920–1922, which collapsed through lack of funding without finding an expedition ship, is likewise excluded, though two men were landed from a Norwegian whaler and spent a year on the Antarctic Peninsula.

Of the ships listed, three survived into the 21st century and are serving as museums: Discovery in Dundee, Fram in Oslo, and Uruguay in Buenos Aires. Two ships – Antarctic and Endurance – were lost in the course of their expeditions; two more – Gauss and Yelcho – were scrapped when their useful lives were over. The fate of the Japanese Kainan Maru is unknown. The others, twelve ships in all, continued their maritime duties and were wrecked or sunk in the years between 1907 and 1962.

== Table 1: Expedition ships ==
Ship/country	GRT	Image	Expedition	Leader	Subsequent history and fate
Belgica (formerly Patria); Belgium	263		Belgian Antarctic Expedition 1897–1899	Adrien de Gerlache	After her Antarctic voyage, Belgica was employed by a succession of owners in various capacities. Following several years as a research vessel in the Kara and Greenland Seas in 1916 she was renamed Isjford and became a coal freighter. Subsequently, she was converted into a floating fish factory. After the outbreak of the Second World War she was seized by the British and used as an ammunition depot, before being sunk by the Germans during an air raid on 19 May 1940. The wreck was rediscovered in 1990.
Southern Cross (formerly Pollux); UK	521		British Antarctic Expedition (Southern Cross Expedition) 1898–1900	Carsten Borchgrevink	In 1901 Southern Cross was sold, and became a seal hunter. She worked in this capacity until late March or early April 1914. Then, while returning to Newfoundland from the Gulf of St Lawrence, she was lost with her entire complement of 173, in the 1914 Newfoundland Sealing Disaster. The precise details of the loss of Southern Cross are unclear; one theory is that its overloaded cargo of seal pelts shifted during a storm and caused the ship to capsize. The loss of life was the heaviest in Newfoundland and Labrador sealing history.
Discovery; UK	736		National Antarctic Expedition (Discovery Expedition) 1901–1904	Robert Falcon Scott	In 1905 Discovery was bought by the Hudson's Bay Company, and used as a cargo vessel until 1911. After some years' inactivity in London, Discovery was used as a supply ship during the First World War. In 1916 she was briefly involved in the search for Shackleton in the aftermath of the Imperial Trans-Antarctic Expedition. After the war she was acquired by Crown Agents and converted for oceanographic research. In 1929 she returned to the Antarctic with Douglas Mawson and the British Australian and New Zealand Antarctic Research Expedition, before being laid up in London where, moored on the Thames Embankment, she served as a training centre for Scouts and Sea Scouts. In 1953 she was bought by the RNVR and used as a drill ship until 1979, when she was sold to the Maritime Trust and became a museum ship. After a spell in London's St Katharine Docks, in 1986 she was taken to Dundee, her home port, where, having been sold to Dundee Industrial Heritage, she became part of a permanent exhibition there.
Gauss (German Empire) Germany	728		First German Antarctic Expedition (Gauss Expedition) 1901–1903	Erich von Drygalski	After its acquisition by the Canadian government in 1905, Gauss was renamed CGS Arctic and enjoyed a long career as a survey vessel in the Canadian Arctic regions, under the command of Joseph-Elzéar Bernier. Following a break in activities during the First World War, in which Arctic saw service as a floating lighthouse, Bernier returned in 1922 to command the ship in further Arctic journeys, until his retirement in 1925. Arctic, by then in poor condition, was sold to the Hudson's Bay Company, which dismantled the ship, the hull of which was abandoned on a sandbank.
Antarctic (formerly Kap Nor); Sweden	346		Swedish Antarctic Expedition 1901–1903	Otto Nordenskiöld	Antarctic did not survive the expedition. After being trapped in pack ice off the Antarctic Peninsula in early 1903, she suffered severe damage and sank off Paulet Island on 12 February 1903. Her complement was rescued without loss of life.
Scotia (formerly Hekla); UK; Scotland	375		Scottish National Antarctic Expedition 1902–1904	William Speirs Bruce	Scotia was sold, and resumed her role as a sealer off the Greenland coast. In 1913 she served as an ice patrol vessel in the North Atlantic. During the First World War she was chartered to the French government and saw service as a freighter. On 18 January 1916 she caught fire, and was burned out on Sully Island in the Bristol Channel.
Français; France	250		Third French Antarctic Expedition 1903–1905	Jean-Baptiste Charcot	After the expedition, Français was sold to the Argentine government and renamed Austral. In December 1907 the ship was wrecked on a sandbank in the Río de la Plata (River Plate).
Nimrod; UK	458		British Antarctic Expedition 1907 (Nimrod Expedition) 1907–1909	Ernest Shackleton	On his return to England in 1909, Shackleton used Nimrod as a floating museum of the expedition, before selling her to help meet the expedition's debts. She worked as a coal carrier for the next few years. On 31 January 1919, Nimrod was wrecked and destroyed on the Barber Sands in the North Sea off the Norfolk coast. Ten of her twelve crew were lost with her.
Pourquoi-Pas? IV; France	445		Fourth French Expedition 1908–1910	Jean-Baptiste Charcot	Pourquoi-pas? was used by the French Navy as a training ship during the First World War, after which Charcot resumed command, and during the following years led many scientific and exploratory missions. In 1928 the ship participated in the search for Roald Amundsen, who disappeared in the Arctic while himself involved in a search for the missing Italian explorer Umberto Nobile. On 16 September 1936, en route to St Malo from Reykjavík, Pourquoi-pas? was wrecked when caught in a cyclone off the coast of Iceland. Only one crew member survived; Charcot was among the victims.
Kainan Maru (formerly Hoko Maru); Japan	204		Japanese Antarctic Expedition 1910–1912	Nobu Shirase	After the return of the expedition, Kainan Maru was sold back to its former owners, and resumed its work as a fishing vessel. Shirase devoted many years to raising funds to cover the expedition's debts and the costs of publishing its results. He died in poverty in 1946. The ship may have been sunk in the Gulf of Tonkin in 1944 by a USAAF attack, but this is not conclusively known.
Fram; Norway	402		Amundsen's South Pole expedition 1910–1912	Roald Amundsen	Amundsen had planned to use Fram as the basis of his intended Arctic drift, but delays, followed by the outbreak of war in 1914, negated his plans. Fram was left for many years to deteriorate at her berth in Horten. In 1925 a committee for the ship's preservation was formed, under Otto Sverdrup; in 1929 restoration work began in the shipyard at Sandefjord. Finally, in 1935, the restored Fram was brought to Oslo under the charge of Oscar Wisting, and placed in specially-erected housing. King Haakon formally opened the Fram House on 20 May 1936, where Fram remains.
Terra Nova; UK	744		British Antarctic Expedition 1910 (Terra Nova Expedition) 1910–1913	Robert Falcon Scott	After its return from the Antarctic in 1913, Terra Nova was repurchased by its former owners and operated as a sealer between 1913 and 1942. During the Second World War she was employed as a supply ship between Newfoundland and Greenland. On 12 September 1943 the ship suffered damage and began to leak badly. Her crew and certain artifacts were transferred to another vessel, after which the hulk was set alight and sunk by gunfire the next day. In August 2012 the wreck of Terra Nova was discovered by a team from the Schmidt Ocean Institute.
Deutschland (formerly Bjørn) (German Empire) Germany	598		Second German Antarctic Expedition 1911–1914	Wilhelm Filchner	After Deutschland returned to Germany she was sold to Felix König, who was intending to organise and lead an Austrian Antarctic Expedition. The ship's name was changed to Osterreich. This expedition was cancelled following the outbreak of the First World War. The ship was requisitioned by the Austro-Hungarian Navy, and served as a minesweeper until torpedoed in the Adriatic Sea in 1917.
Aurora; Australia; New Zealand	386		Australasian Antarctic Expedition 1911–1914	Douglas Mawson	At the end of the expedition Aurora was left in Tasmania, and was sold to Sir Ernest Shackleton for £3,200, for use in the Ross Sea party component of the Imperial Trans-Antarctic Expedition.
Endurance (formerly Polaris); UK	350		Imperial Trans-Antarctic Expedition 1914–1917	Ernest Shackleton	Endurance was trapped by ice in the Weddell Sea, crushed and abandoned on 27 October 1915, and later sank. Her crew made their way over the ice and by small boats to Elephant Island, from where they were eventually rescued. The wreck was discovered on 5 March 2022.
Aurora; UK			Ross Sea party 1914–1917 (in support of Imperial Trans-Antarctic Expedition)	Aeneas Mackintosh	After completing the rescue mission of the Ross Sea party, Aurora was sold by Shackleton to W.R. Grace & Co of New York, for £10,000. In her new role, on 17 June 1917 she departed for Iquique in Chile, with a cargo of coal. She was never heard of again, although on 5 December 1917 a lifebelt bearing Aurora's name was recovered off the New South Wales coast. The ship was posted as missing by Lloyd's of London on 2 January 1918. Several theories to explain the disappearance have been raised, including severe weather and possible enemy action, but the cause of the loss remains a matter of conjecture.
Quest (formerly Foca I); UK	205		Shackleton–Rowett Expedition	Ernest Shackleton	After the expedition Quest was sold, and operated by Norwegian owners as a sealer and Arctic research ship until 1940. In 1928 she participated in the search for Umberto Nobile, missing in the Arctic with the airship Italia, and in 1930 was chartered by the British Arctic Air Route Expedition, investigating the possibility of air routes to Canada via Greenland. During the Second World War Quest was loaned to the allied navies; in 1946 she was returned to her owners, and continued to work as a sealer until 5 May 1962, when she was trapped by ice and sank off the coast of Labrador.

== Table 2: Support and relief ships ==
Ship	Captain	Image	Expedition	History and subsequent fate
Morning UK	William Colbeck		National Antarctic Expedition (Discovery Expedition) 1901–1904	The auxiliary barque Morning (originally Morgenen) was built in 1871 as an Arctic whaler. She made two Antarctic voyages in support of the Discovery Expedition. In January–February 1903 she delivered fresh supplies, but was unable to break through to help free Discovery from the ice which had held her since March 1902. She returned in January 1904 when, with the assistance of a second relief vessel, Scott's future expedition ship Terra Nova, Discovery was finally freed and able to return home. After her Antarctic missions, Morning returned to her whaling duties. She was lost during a storm in the North Atlantic on 24 December 1915.
Uruguay Argentina	Julián Irízar		Swedish Antarctic Expedition 1901–1903	British-built in Birkenhead in 1874, Uruguay saw many years of service with the Argentine Navy before undertaking the work of an Antarctic relief and rescue ship. Her success, under the captaincy of Julián Irízar, in effecting the rescue of Otto Nordenskjöld's expedition from Snow Hill Island and Paulet Island created much interest. Between 1903 and 1922 Uruguay made 13 further relief voyages to the Antarctic. After her retirement she was used by the Argentine Navy as a depot ship. In the 1980s, restored and rebuilt, she became a museum ship, permanently moored at Puerto Madero in Buenos Aires.
Koonya New Zealand	Frederick Pryce Evans		Nimrod Expedition 1907–1909	Koonya was a steam cargo ship, 1,091 gross register tonnage, built in 1898 at Grangemouth. Under her captain, Frederick Evans, between 1 and 14 January 1908 she towed Nimrod from New Zealand to the Antarctic Circle, a distance of about 1,500 miles (2,400 km), so that the latter vessel could conserve coal. In doing so, according to Shackleton, she became the first steel-built ship to cross the Antarctic Circle. On 3 June 1919 Koonya ran aground at Sandy Cape in Tasmania, and was wrecked. All her crew escaped.
Instituto de Pesca Nº1; Uruguay	Ruperto Elichiribehety		Imperial Trans-Antarctic Expedition 1914–1917	The modified steam powered fishing vessel Instituto de Pesca Nº1 was instrumental in the rescue mission organized by Uruguay in 1916 to aid the crew of Ernest Shackleton’s Endurance stranded on Elephant Island. It set sail from Montevideo on 9 June, 1916, under the command of Lieutenant Ruperto Elichiribehety, and after reaching the island, the expedition was forced to turn back without disembarking due to the impenetrable ice barrier, returning on July 14 to the Port of Montevideo. In addition to its Antarctic rescue mission, the expedition participated in the search for the Argos, an Argentine cargo steamer that had gone missing while en route to the South Georgia Islands. It also carried out scientific research, recording meteorological data and collecting water samples As part of their scientific work, they were equipped with high-precision thermometers, psychrometers, and instruments for collecting water samples and measuring water temperature at various depths. They also carried bottles to be released into the water containing documentation indicating the date and location, which were commonly used to study ocean currents.
Yelcho; Chile	Luis Pardo		Imperial Trans-Antarctic Expedition 1914–1917	Shackleton made three unsuccessful attempts to rescue the Endurance crew stranded on Elephant Island. For a fourth attempt he was given use of the Chilean naval tug Yelcho, under its captain Luis Pardo. Yelcho sailed from Punta Arenas on 25 August 1916 and, helped by unexpectedly calm seas, reached Elephant Island on 30 August, when the rescue was duly effected. After the return, to massive celebrations in Puntas Arenas on 3 September, Yelcho took Shackleton and his crew to Valparaíso and Santiago, where the welcomes were equally vociferous. Yelcho then returned to her naval duties, and served until 1945, when she was withdrawn from regular duty but continued to be used as a tender at the Petty Officer School until 1958. She was finally scrapped in 1962. In recognition of her Antarctic rescue, the ship's prow was incorporated into a permanent monument, which stands in Puerto Williams, Chile's southernmost coastal town.

== See also ==
- Heroic Age of Antarctic Exploration

== Notes and references ==
=== Sources ===
==== Books, journals and newspapers ====
- "The Polar Ship Belgica". Polar Record. 41. Cambridge University Press: 205–214. 2005.
- Benson, Keith R.; Rehbock, Philip F. (2002). Oceanographic History: The Pacific and Beyond. Seattle and London: University of Washington Press. ISBN 0-295-98239-X.
- Bryan, Rorke (2011). Ordeal by Ice: Ships of the Antarctic. New York: Sheridan House. ISBN 978-1-57409-312-4.
- Dodd, David (June 2017). "The final voyage of SY Aurora". Australian Antarctic Magazine (32). Archived from the original on 2019-09-02.
- Donaghy, Aaron (2014). The British Government and the Falkland Islands, 1974-79. Basingstoke: Palgrave Macmillan. ISBN 978-1-322-10688-5.
- Erskin, Angus B.; Kjær, Kjell-G. (2005). "The Polar Ship Scotia". Polar Record. 41 (2). Cambridge University Press: 131–140. Bibcode:2005PoRec..41..131E. doi:10.1017/S0032247405004237. S2CID 129860880.
- Lloyds Registry: Steamships and motor-ships, DIR–DJA (PDF). Lloyd's of London. 1934–1935. Archived from the original (PDF) on 2009-02-25.
- Riffenburgh, Beau (2005). Nimrod: Ernest Shackleton and the Extraordinary Story of the 1907–09 British Antarctic Expedition. London: Bloomsbury Publishing. ISBN 978-0-7475-7253-4.
- Riffenburgh, Beau (2007). Encyclopedia of the Arctic, Vol. 1. New York and Abingdon: Routledge. ISBN 978-0-415-97024-2.
- Savours, Ann (2001). The Voyages of the Discovery. London: Chatham Publishing. ISBN 978-1-861-78149-9.
- Schäufflen, Otmar (2002). Great Sailing Ships of the World. New York: Hearst Books. ISBN 1-58816-384-9.
- Shackleton, Ernest (2007). The Heart of the Antarctic. Ware, Hertfordshire: Wordsworth Editions. ISBN 978-1-840-22616-4.
- Smith, Michael (2019). Shackleton: By Endurance We Conquer. London: Oneworld Publications. ISBN 978-1-780-74707-1.
- Stewart, John (1990). Antarctica: an Encyclopedia. Jefferson, NC: McFarland. ISBN 978-0-899-50470-4.
- Turney, Chris (2012). 1912: The Year the World Discovered Antarctica. London: The Bodley Head. ISBN 978-1-84792-174-1.
- "Wreck of Captain Scott's ship discovered off Greenland". The Daily Telegraph. 2012-08-15.

==== Online ====
Belgica

- "Belgica – Ships of the Polar Explorers". Cool Antarctica.
- "Belgica: whaler and research ship". University of Southampton. Archived from the original on 2019-09-02.

Southern Cross

- "The 1914 Sealing Disaster". Heritage Newfoundland and Labrador.

Gauss

- Finnie, Richard S. "Arctic Profiles: Joseph Elzéar Bernier (1852–1934)" (PDF). University of Calgary. Archived from the original (PDF) on 2011-05-24.

Antarctic

- "Otto Nordenskjöld, Antarctic (ship): Swedish Antarctic Expedition 1901–1904". Cool Antarctica.

Scotia

- "1900 Seil/DS HEKLA (048190001)" (in Norwegian). Lardex. Archived from the original on 2019-08-03.

Pourquoi-pas?

- "Jean-Baptiste-Étienne-Auguste Charcot". Encyclopædia Britannica. 2019-07-11.

Kainan Maru

- Florek, Stan (2013-03-22). "Our Global Neighbours". Australian Museum.

Fram

- "The Polar Ship Fram". The Fram Museum. 2018. Archived from the original on 2019-08-04.

Terra Nova

- "Captain Scott's ship the Terra Nova". Royal Museums Greenwich.
- "Scott's wrecked ship Terra Nova found off Greenland". BBC. 2012-08-16.
- "SS Terra Nova found". Schmidt Ocean Institute. 2012-08-10.

Aurora

- "A Poignant Reminder from the Plucky Little Ship Aurora". Australian National Maritime Museum. 2017-06-20.

Quest

- "Ships, Quest collection: Administrative/biographical history". Jisc Archives hub.

Morning

- "Antarctic Relief Expeditions 1902–04". Scott Polar Research Institute, University of Cambridge. 2019-08-12.
- "Photograph of auxiliary barque SY Morning near Dundee Wharf". Australian National Maritime Museum.

Uruguay

- "Antarctic Explorers: Otto Nordenskjöld (1869–1928)". South-Pole.com.
- "A.R.A. Uruguay Museum Ship". Buenos Aires Ciudad. 2017-08-04.

Koonya

- "THE KOONYA'S WRECK". Mercury. 1919-06-28.

Yelcho

- "Scottish Built Ships: The History of Shipbuilding in Scotland". The Caledonian Maritime Research Trust.
- "Shackleton News Archive". The James Caird Society. Archived from the original on 2016-09-19.

Other ships

- "Carl Chun Collection". Archive Hub.
- "John Lachlan Cope's Expedition to Graham Land 1920–22". Scott Polar Research Institute.
