= Lewald Glacier =

Glacier in Antarctica

- Location within South Georgia Island
- Location: South Georgia
- Coordinates: 54°45′S 35°52′W
- Length: 3 nmi (6 km; 3 mi)
- Thickness: unknown
- Status: unknown

Lewald Glacier (54°45′S 35°52′W) is a small glacier 3 nautical miles (6 km) west of Cape Vahsel, flowing northward to the coast at the east end of South Georgia. It was named by the Second German Antarctic Expedition, 1911–12, under Wilhelm Filchner, for Theodor Lewald, Ministerialdirektor im Reichsamt des Innern, Germany, who took an active interest in the expedition.

== See also ==
- List of glaciers in the Antarctic
- Glaciology
