= Deutschland (1905) =

Norwegian ship

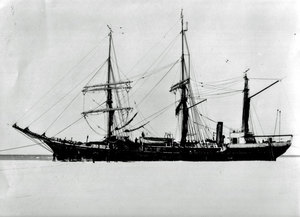
- Deutschland at an unknown date

History

Norway, later Germany, later Austria
- Owner: Christen Christensen, then Wilhelm Filchner, then Felix König
- Builder: Risør shipyard, modified 1910 at Framnæs Mekaniske Værksted shipyard Sandefjord, Norway
- Launched: 1905
- Fate: Sunk by a torpedo in the Adriatic Sea, 1917

General characteristics
- Type: Barque
- Tonnage: 598 GRT
- Length: 48.5 m (159 ft)
- Beam: 9.02 m (29.6 ft)
- Draught: At stem, 5.49 m (18.0 ft); at stern 6.56 m (21.5 ft)
- Propulsion: 330 hp (250 kW) Coal fired steam and sail
- Speed: up to 10 knots

Deutschland, known as Bjørn between 1905 and 1909, and Osterreich between 1914 and 1917, was a Norwegian whaling and sealing ship, built in 1905. She is best known for her role as the expedition ship in the Second German Antarctic Expedition of 1911–1913. During this expedition she was taken further south in the Weddell Sea than any previous vessel in those waters, but became trapped, surviving an eight-months long drift in heavy ice before being freed. After the expedition she was sold to Austria as the basis for another planned Antarctic expedition, but this was cancelled on the outbreak of the First World War in August 1914. The ship served in the Austro-Hungarian Navy as a minesweeper until 1917, when she was sunk in a torpedo attack.

== Origin ==
Deutschland began her career as a Norwegian bottle-nosed whaler and sealer, built at the Risør shipyard in 1905 for Christen Christensen. She was christened Bjørn, and was employed in the Arctic, under her captain, Bjørn Jorgensen, where she gained a good reputation as a reliable sailer in ice-bound waters.

== Construction ==
Bjørn was built as a three-masted barque, gross register tonnage 598, with measurements of 48.5 metres (158 feet) length overall, 9.02 m (29.68 ft) beam, and a fully laden draught of 5.49 m (18 ft) at the stem and 6.56 m (21 ft) at the stern. The all-wooden hull was constructed to an exceptional strength, with outer oak planking of 15 cm (6 in) oak sheathed with 8 cm (3¼in) greenheart. The inner hull, probably of fir, gave another 15 cm of thickness. The oak ribs were 24 cm (9½in) at the waterline, extending to 39 cm (15¼in) at the keel. The oak deck was supported on 25 cm (10 in) beams.

The mainmast stood at 24m (78¾ft), with a 21 m (69 ft) foremast. Little information is available as to her rigging plan; Rorke Bryan in his history of the polar ships states that "she carried topgallants but no royals, and rather surprisingly for a new ship, had undivided topsails". Under full sail she was reportedly capable of speeds of 9–10 knots in fair weather. She was equipped with a coal-burning auxiliary engine that gave 210 horsepower and was later modified to provide greater power.

== Polar career ==
=== Shackleton ===
In 1907 Ernest Shackleton was organising his British Antarctic Expedition, and seeking a suitable ship to take him south. He learned from Christiansen that Bjørn was for sale, and travelled to Sandefjord to inspect her. Unfortunately, Christiansen's price – £11,000, or approximately £1,150,000 in 2018 terms – was beyond Shackleton's means; he eventually acquired the much older, smaller Nimrod for around half of Bjørn's price. Bjørn continued successfully with her sealing duties in the Arctic, under Jorgensen.

=== Second German Antarctic Expedition, 1911–13 ===
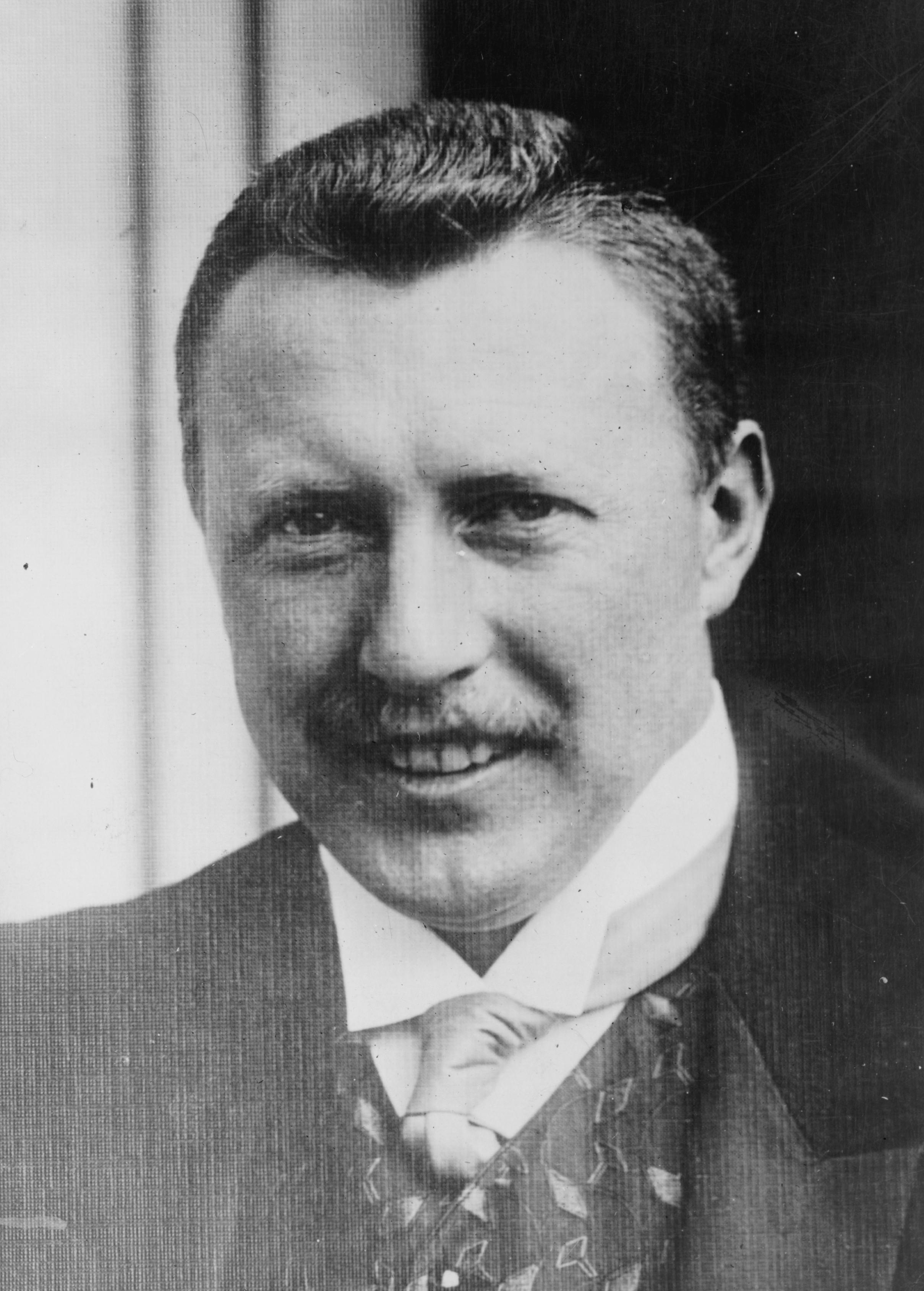
Wilhelm Filchner

In 1909 Wilhelm Filchner began his preparations for the Second German Antarctic Expedition, to the Weddell Sea. He wished to land there, and to examine the nature of the connection between the eastern and western sectors of the still largely unexplored Antarctic continent. Bjørn was again available, at the increased price of £12,700 (around £1,300,000 present-day). Filchner, with greater financial resources than Shackleton, considered this a fair price, and bought her, renaming her Deutschland. She was then taken to the Framnæs Mekaniske Værksted shipyard in Sandefjord for extensive modification; later, in the Blohm and Voss shipyard in Hamburg, her engine capacity was increased to 300 hp. This could provide a speed of around 7 knots in suitable weather, burning approximately 6 tons of coal daily – 3 at half-speed.

Under guidance freely provided by Shackleton, further strengthening of the hull took place, with additional 20 cm (8 in) diagonal braces, and protection at the stem by iron plating. A well was built through which the propellers – nickel steel, created by the Krupp factory in Essen – could be hauled to safety when not in use. The interior of the ship was substantially redesigned to meet the requirements of an Antarctic voyage; sixteen cabins for officers and scientific staff, an extended fo'c'sle to accommodate the crew, and a purpose-built laboratory on the main deck. Other features – galley, main saloon, charthouse and bridge, were likewise upgraded. A generator was installed, to provide electric light throughout the ship.

Deutschland sailed from Bremerhaven in May 1911, under Captain Richard Vahsel, on the first leg of her voyage, which took her to Buenos Aires. During this stage an extensive oceanographic study of the Atlantic was carried out. Filchner joined the expedition at Buenos Aires; Deutschland then moved on to South Georgia and, while waiting for ice conditions in the southern ocean to improve, made a brief experimental trip to the South Sandwich Islands, although was unable to land there due to bad weather. On 11 December 1911 sea conditions were deemed satisfactory for travelling south, and the heavily laden Deutschland departed for the Weddell Sea. In the course of the ensuing seven-week voyage, often held up by thick ice, she travelled further south than any previous ship in this sea, surpassing James Weddell's 90-year-old southernmost mark of 74°15'S on 29 January 1912. On 31 January, at 77°48'S after steaming through open waters, she reached the southern limits of the Weddell Sea at a vast ice barrier, later named after Filchner.

Here, in a small inlet christened Vahsel Bay, Filchner attempted to establish a shore base, but was unable to do so – the camp was set up on a berg that broke loose in a tidal surge. Further attempts also failed, and it now being late in the season, on 4 March 1912 Deutschland was turned northwards, to head back to South Georgia and await a further opportunity in the following summer. However, they had left it too late; almost immediately, the ship was beset in solid ice and all attempts, including the use of dynamite, failed to free her. She began a slow drift through the Weddell Sea that extended over eight months, before breaking free from the ice on 26 November 1912. She finally reached South Georgia on 19 December, but by this time the expedition was in almost complete disarray. Vahsel had died during the drift, internal dissents and disagreements among officers, staff and crew had degenerated towards outright violence, and morale was at rock-bottom. In these circumstances the expedition could not continue, and the personnel dispersed.

Under a replacement captain, Alfred Kling, Deutschland sailed to Buenos Aires, where she was loaned temporarily to the Argentine government to relieve the government's Laurie Island weather station. After carrying out further oceanographical work in the South Atlantic, she returned to Germany in late 1913.

=== Felix König and proposed Austrian Antarctic Expedition, 1914 ===
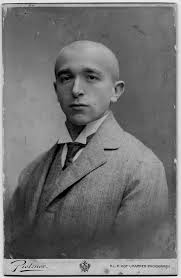
Felix König

Filchner had lost his enthusiasm for Antarctic exploration, but the Austrian Felix König, a biologist and alpinist who had accompanied Filchner on the German expedition, was anxious to make a repeat attempt on a Weddell Sea landing and to resume Filchner's aborted plans. With the help of wealthy backers in Austria, he bought Deutschland and changed her name once again, this time to Osterreich. When he announced his plans early in 1914, he found that they clashed with those of Shackleton's Imperial Trans-Antarctic Expedition, by this time well advanced. Shackleton claimed priority because he had stated his initial intentions as far back as 1909; König claimed that as a co-discoverer of the Vahsel Bay location, and as Filchner's approved successor, he had the prior right to work in this area. Each refused to defer to other; attempts by Filchner and others to mediate, or to achieve a measure of cooperation between the two expeditions, were unsuccessful. It appeared that two competing expeditions, with similar objectives, would be in the same location at the same time.

== First World War ==
Early in August 1914, Osterreich lay in harbour in Trieste, awaiting instructions. The situation in Europe was rapidly descending into war; König received orders to cancel his expedition (Shackleton, on the other hand, received instructions from the British Admiralty to proceed). When war was declared, Osterreich was requisitioned by the Austro-Hungarian Navy and commissioned as a minesweeper. She served in this capacity until 1917, when she was sunk by a torpedo in the Adriatic Sea. Meanwhile, Shackleton's ship Endurance entered the Weddell Sea in January 1911 but failed to reach Vahsel Bay, was caught in the ice, and drifted until October 1915 before being crushed and sunk. Her crew escaped to Elephant Island by sledge and boat, and were ultimately rescued in August 1916.

== See also ==
- Heroic Age of Antarctic Exploration
- List of Antarctic exploration ships from the Heroic Age, 1897–1922
