= Heinrich Seelheim =

German geographer and diplomat

Heinrich Seelheim (15 August 1884 – 18 December 1964) was a German geographer and diplomat, who was a member of Wilhelm Filchner's Second German Antarctic Expedition in 1911–13. In 1910, to gain polar travel experience, he participated with Filchner and others in a trial expedition to Spitsbergen. He was in charge of the first leg of the Antarctic expedition, between Germany and Buenos Aires, while Filchner remained in Germany. Seelheim resigned from the expedition in Buenos Aires, because of disputes with the ship's captain, Richard Vahsel. After the First World War, Seelheim entered the diplomatic service, and was subsequently German consul in Winnipeg, Canada, and Yokohama, Japan.

Seelheim joined the Nazi Party in 1934. While in Canada, he wrote reports about other Nazis in Canada and supported the Canadian Nazi movement, as did the German Federation of Canada (German: Deutschen Bund Kanada) and the German Newspaper for Canada (German: Deutsche Zeitung für Canada).
