= Filchner Rocks =

The Filchner Rocks (54°42′S 35°44′W) are a group of rocks, some of which are submerged, 4 nautical miles (7 km) northeast of Cape Vahsel, off the east end of South Georgia. The existence of these rocks was reported in 1775 by a British expedition under James Cook. They were charted by the Second German Antarctic Expedition, 1911–12, and named for Dr. Wilhelm Filchner, leader of the expedition.
