= Joseph Foster Stackhouse =

British traveller and would-be explorer

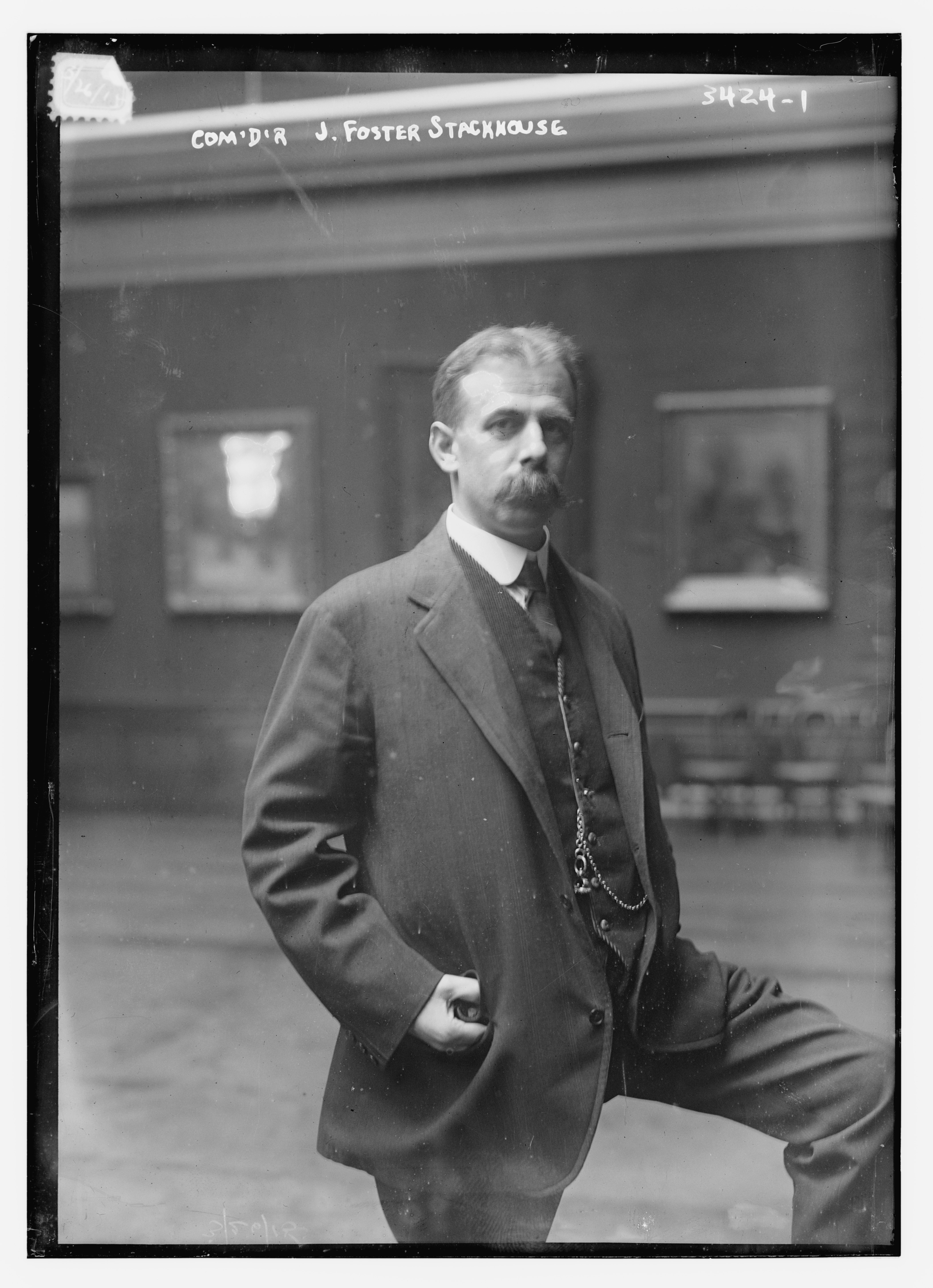
- Born: 10 August 1873; Kendal, United Kingdom
- Died: 7 May 1915 (aged 41); Atlantic Ocean
- Occupation: Explorer

Joseph Foster Stackhouse (10 August 1873 – 7 May 1915) was a British traveller and would-be explorer who, in 1911, led an expedition to the Arctic island of Jan Mayen. In 1914 he attempted to organise a British expedition to the Antarctic, but this was prevented by the outbreak of the First World War. He died in the sinking of the Lusitania.

Born to an English Quaker family in the north of England, Stackhouse worked as an official with a railway company, while indulging in a passion for foreign travel. A member of the Royal Geographical Society, he was a friend and associate of Robert Falcon Scott, and assisted in the preparation of Scott's Terra Nova Expedition, 1910–13. Stackhouse's aborted plan for an Antarctic expedition was originally conceived as a continuation of Scott's work. After its abandonment, he revised and extended his scheme into a broad oceanographic survey, and went to America to gather support and funding for this purpose. He was lost in the Lusitania while returning to England.

== Life ==
=== Early life and career ===
Stackhouse was born on 10 August 1873, to a Quaker family in Kendal (then in the northern English county of Westmorland, now part of Cumbria). His parents were Thomas Petchell Stackhouse and Martha Stackhouse, née Bowden.

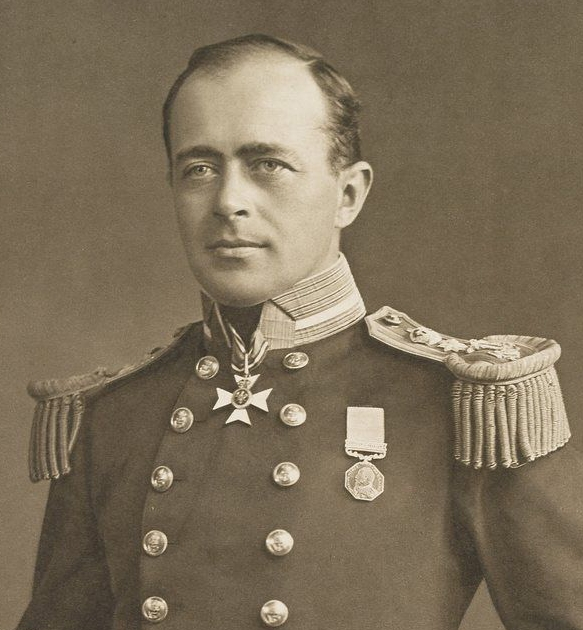
Robert Falcon Scott in 1909

After the family moved south to London, Stackhouse attended Sidcot, a Quaker boarding school at Winscombe in Somerset. On leaving school, he moved back to the north and embarked on a business career with the North Eastern Railway Company. He developed an abiding interest in foreign travel, became a Fellow of the Royal Geographical Society (RGS), and visited numerous countries: Egypt, Finland, Malta, Morocco, the United States, and many more. In 1900 he married Florence Hutchinson, whose uncle Sir Jonathan Hutchinson was a former president of the Royal College of Surgeons and surgeon to Queen Victoria. A daughter was born to the marriage in about 1903.

At some stage in his early career, Stackhouse met and formed a close friendship with the British explorer Robert Falcon Scott. In 1909, Scott was embarking on a new quest for the South Pole, following Ernest Shackleton's near miss earlier that year. Stackhouse became an honorary secretary to Scott's Terra Nova expedition, and took charge of fund-raising in the north of England; he also committed a substantial portion of his private resources to the enterprise. Scott's records show that the pony "Snooker King", otherwise known as "Jehu", was donated to the expedition by "J. Foster Stackhouse and friend". (Note: In his journals, Scott is initially very disparaging about Jehu, describing him as "useless". However, on the southern march, Jehu exceeded all expectations and, shortly before he was shot with the other ponies at the end of the Great Ice Barrier trek, was dubbed "The Barrier Wonder".) Scott would have taken Stackhouse to the Antarctic, had the latter been available, a fact later confirmed by the expedition's second-in-command, E.R.G.R. "Teddy" Evans.

=== Jan Mayen, 1911 ===
In 1911 Stackhouse organised and led a short expedition to the remote, uninhabited Arctic island of Jan Mayen. The island lies in the North Atlantic, between Iceland and the Svalbard (Spitzbergen) archipelago, at approximately 71°N, 8°W. The history of its early discovery is obscure; it was "rediscovered" several times in the early 17th century, and became a popular destination for whalers. The island provided a base for the Austro-Hungarian Arctic Expedition of 1882–83, and afterwards received regular short visits from explorers including, among others, Otto Nordenskjöld in 1900, Jean-Baptiste Charcot in 1902 and after, and the Duchess of Bedford in 1911.

Stackhouse's 1911 venture was organised in partnership with the Swedish explorer Axel Klinckowström. Correspondence between the two indicates that the original plans had been to explore the island of Mevenklint, off the Greenland coast, but the destination was subsequently changed to Jan Mayen. The stated objectives of the expedition were to carry out meteorological observations between Iceland and Jan Mayen, and to survey the island's coastline as part of the preparation of an updated relief map. There may also have been a commercial motive; Stackhouse charged a fee of £37 (about £3,700 in 2018 terms – RPI method) to non-scientist travellers, and might have been considering the possibilities for future tourism.

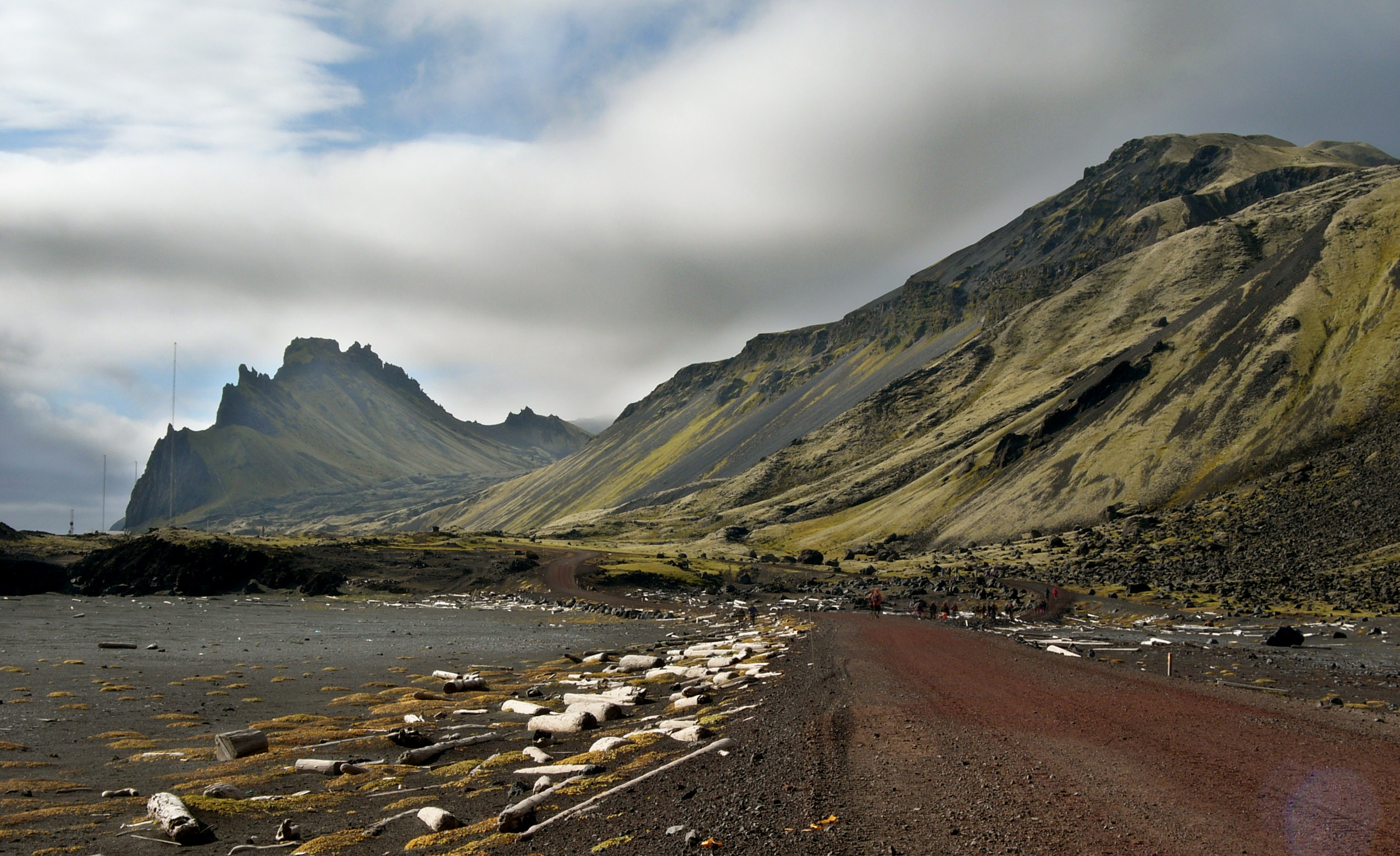
The coast of Jan Mayen, photographed in 2007

The expedition, which sailed from Newcastle on 30 July 1911, was beset with problems from the beginning. The ship originally chartered, a wooden-hulled vessel designed for navigation in Arctic waters, was withdrawn by its owner on religious grounds; he demanded an assurance, not given, that every Sunday would be spent in port and that the crew would attend church services. The replacement was a smaller iron-hulled steam yacht, the Matador, which had a reduced capacity for coal and therefore a shorter range – along with other shortcomings. The ship reached Iceland on 3 August, but severe weather in the following days confined its activities to a survey and exploration of the Icelandic coasts. When, finally, Matador reached Jan Mayen, the expedition was unable to land; the main work of the expedition, therefore, was the meteorological observations recorded between Iceland and the island.

The Stackhouse–Klinckowström correspondence refers to numerous organisational problems, including the lack on departure of the requisite Bill of health, the absence of a chronometer, no heating or appropriate warm clothing on the vessel, and inadequate equipment. Notwithstanding, Stackhouse was prepared for another visit later in the year, but Klinckowström demurred, stating that "no future expedition should mingle British and Continental elements, because of differences in method".

Following the expedition, Stackhouse discussed his ideas for tourism with the Scottish Spitzbergen Syndicate, involving the possible erection of a hotel on the main island of the Spitzbergen archipelago. He proposed to "dump a prefabricated building and some builders on Spitzbergen" before going on to Jan Mayen. He later said that he had been promised an investment of £5,000 for this venture (around £500,000 in 2018), but these funds did not materialise and the scheme was abandoned.

=== Proposed British Antarctic Expedition, 1914 ===
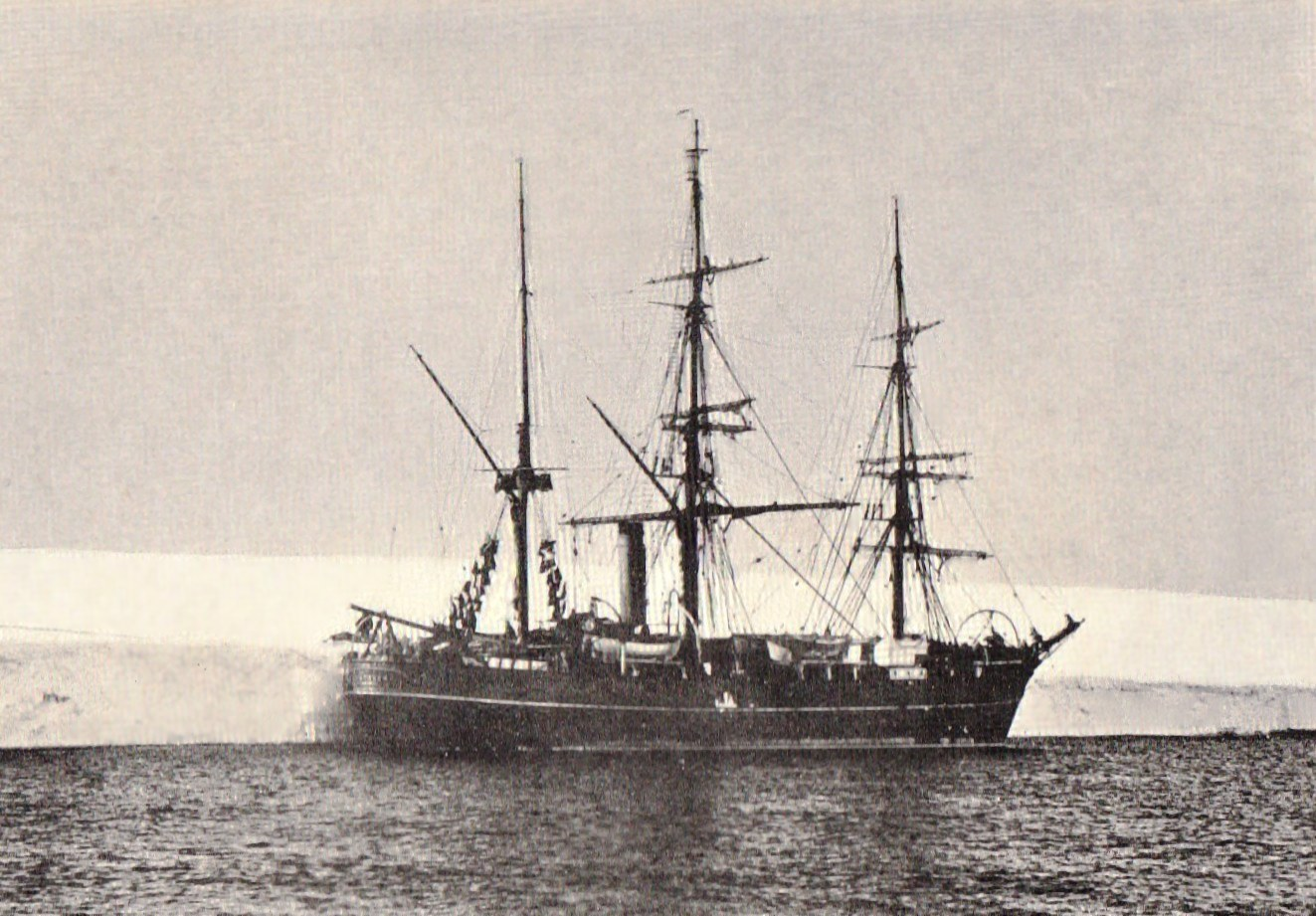
Discovery

News reached England in January 1913 that Scott had attained the South Pole in January 1912, five weeks after the Norwegian expedition led by Roald Amundsen. Scott and four comrades had perished on their return journey from the Pole. In an interview with the Daily Mirror on 13 February 1913, Stackhouse praised Scott's heroism in staying with his ailing companions rather than seeking to save himself: "I am sure that if he had not felt bound to stand by that poor fellow Evans after he became helpless, he would be alive today". The tragedy did not, however, quell Stackhouse's enthusiasm for exploration, and in 1913 he revealed plans for his own Antarctic expedition. The main objective, he said, would be to explore the coastline between Graham Land and King Edward VII Land. He saw this venture as a solemn duty; Scott, he said, had urged him to undertake this task, which would form a continuation of Scott's own work.

In the furtherance of his plans, Stackhouse bought Scott's old ship Discovery from the Hudson's Bay Company for £9,500 – a fraction of its original cost of £51,000 – and paid a deposit of £1,000. Stackhouse announced that during the expedition Discovery was to be captained by Arthur Harbord, who had been second officer on the Nimrod in Shackleton's 1907–09 expedition. All officers and scientists would serve without pay. Stackhouse released several names who had volunteered for his expedition: Lieut. Richard Garsden of the Royal Indian Marine would be first officer; Lieut. R. Beatty, also from the RIM and a cousin of Admiral Beatty, would be navigating officer; Lord Congleton (Note: Henry Bligh Fortescue Parnell, 5th Baron Congleton, was killed in action on 10 November 1914, during the Second Battle of Ypres.) and the pioneer aviator William Forbes-Sempill (known as the Master of Sempill) would join the scientific staff. Stackhouse was hoping to obtain the services as boatswain of Tom Crean, who had served with Scott on both his Antarctic expeditions. Crean, however, had committed himself to Shackleton. The expedition received significant support from Sir Clements Markham, the still-influential RGS former president; according to Markham, "All who have at heart the continuance of the best traditions of British discovery will join in wishing all possible success to this enterprise". The RGS secretary, John Scott Keltie, was less impressed; he did not consider Stackhouse's plans to be viable, and withheld the Society's official endorsement.

Stackhouse planned to leave Britain by 1 August 1914, but fell behind schedule; the New York Times on 18 April reported that departure had been delayed until "November or early next year", while the Adelaide Advertiser gave December 1914 as a probable starting date. However, the outbreak of the First World War in August 1914 forced Stackhouse to reconsider all his plans, and the expedition, along with several other concurrent Antarctic projects, was abruptly cancelled. (Note: Stackhouse had not been alone, in 1913, in planning an Antarctic expedition. The Austrian Felix König had acquired Wilhelm Filchner's ship Deutschland, and intended to return to the Weddell Sea to continue the work begun by the recent German Antarctic Expedition. An Anglo-Swedish scientific expedition was being planned by Otto Nordenskjöld and Louis Palander, to revisit the areas covered in 1901–03 by the Swedish Antarctic Expedition. Shackleton was organising a new, ambitious venture to effect the first crossing of the Antarctic continent.) Shackleton, whose plans for a transcontinental crossing were far advanced, got away on 3 August, on instructions from the British Admiralty, the day before Britain declared war on Germany.

=== International Oceanographic Expedition ===
Unable to proceed with his original plans, in August 1914 Stackhouse went to the United States, in search of new funding and support. In January 1915 he produced a prospectus for a revised scheme, which he now called the "International Oceanographic Expedition". This was vastly extended in range and scope from his original British proposals. What he now envisaged was a voyage of some 250,000 miles extending over seven years, which would chart the main oceans of the world: "Many thousands of islands, rocks and reefs now uncharted, or whose position is shown only approximately, will be definitely charted". This, Stackhouse said, would be of incalculable benefit not only to international trade, but would "decrease the tremendous toll of human life which the sea exacts annually". Among specific matters that he proposed to investigate was the circumstances of the sinking of RMS Titanic in the North Atlantic, in 1912. The expedition would carry out a full programme of scientific work, in the various fields of geology, biology, botany, and ethnology. The Antarctic coastal survey, the original "continuation of Scott's work", was now a secondary feature that would occupy the summer months.

Stackhouse's ideas were received with some enthusiasm in the United States. Science magazine stated: "Not since the Challenger has so great an enterprise been undertaken". (Note: Between 1872 and 1876, the British ship HMS Challenger conducted the first global scientific study of oceans and the sea floor, travelling over 100,000 km.) Adept at self-promotion, Stackhouse adopted the style of "Commander", (Note: The honorific of "Commander" reflected his role as leader of his proposed expedition rather than the award of a naval rank, although some writers have assumed a naval background; a recent source describes him as "a retired US Naval officer". Stackhouse's exact status caused some confusion in America – in one newspaper report he becomes "Sir J. Foster Stackhouse of the British Admiralty". Diana Preston adds, without supporting evidence, that he was rumoured to be a British spy, a notion adopted by the 2017 novel Lusitania Lost, in which Stackhouse is "a noted sea-captain planning an Antarctic research voyage and rumored to be a British spy".) and despite his lack of scientific training, was hailed as "one of the world's leading oceanographers". The extent to which his plans received formal support from scientific bodies or government departments is uncertain, and his claims to such support may have been exaggerated for the benefit of potential donors. He asserted, optimistically, that his expedition would be under way in the summer of 1915. On 1 May, in New York, he boarded RMS Lusitania for a passage to Liverpool. (Note: Stackhouse is shown in the Saloon (First Class) Passenger List as occupying cabin A34. His residence is shown as "London, England".) On that day, New York newspapers published a warning from the German Embassy that the ship would be entering a war zone, and that "vessels flying the flag of Great Britain, or any of her allies, are liable to destruction in those waters".

=== Death and after ===
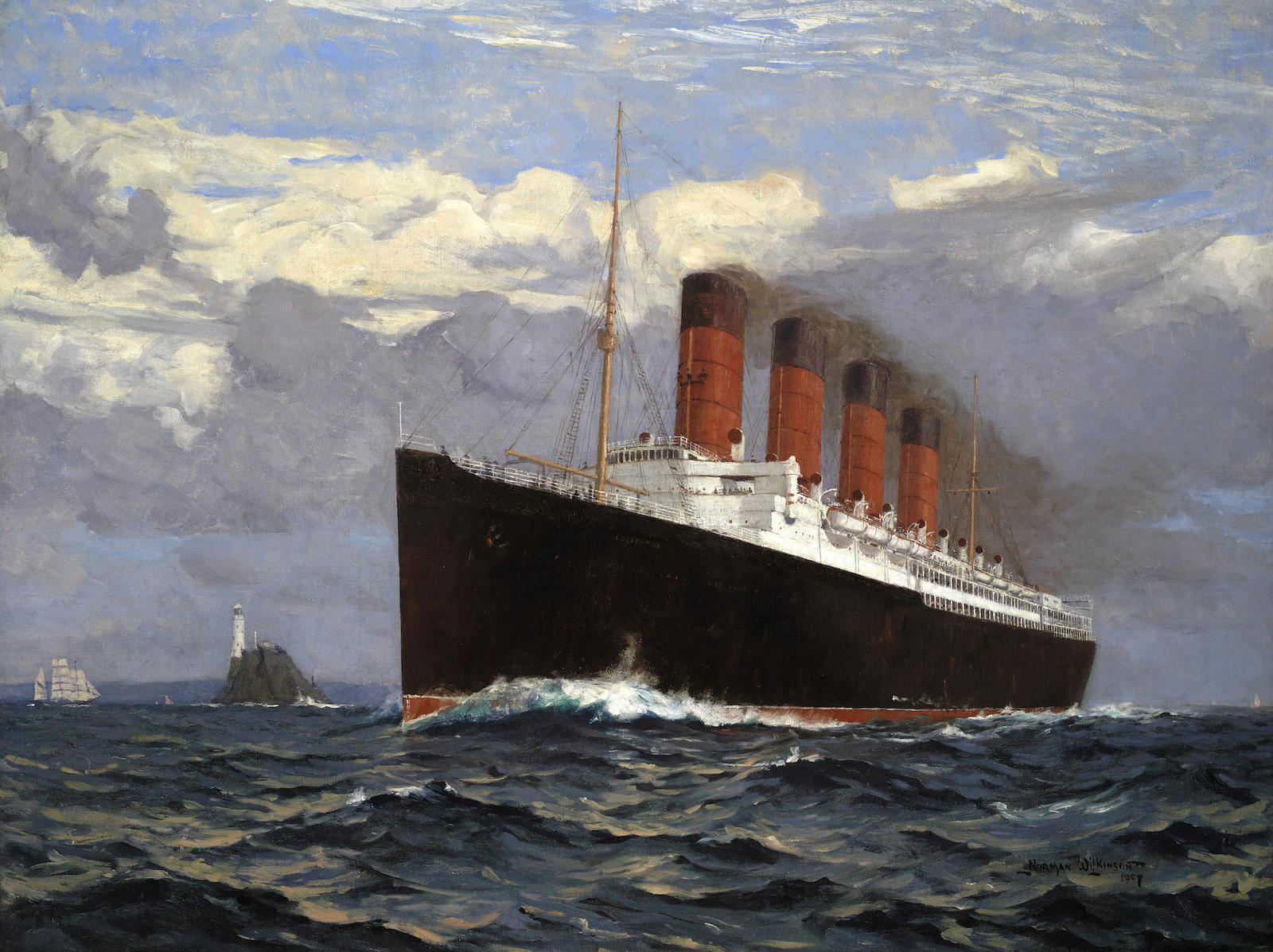
RMS Lusitania

At around 2.10 pm on 7 May 1915, off the coast of Ireland, Lusitania was struck by a torpedo fired by a German U-20 submarine. In less than 20 minutes she sank; almost 1,200 passengers and crew were killed.

There are several accounts of Stackhouse's activities in the moments immediately before and after the impact. According to a fellow-passenger, Harold Boulton, at the moment the torpedo struck he and Stackhouse were in the Verandah Café, where Stackhouse was explaining why he thought Lusitania was safe from enemy attack. There were two loud, crashing sounds, after which water and debris came through the roof. A little later, Stackhouse was observed on deck, without a life-jacket; he had refused a place in a lifeboat, and had given his life-jacket to a little girl. He was last seen, as the ship went down, "standing calmly at her stern". Another eyewitness wrote: "His calm courage and confidence went a long way to stopping any panic, and in that way his assurance was of great value in saving lives. He died a splendid death". His body was eventually recovered from the sea; in his pockets was a scrap of paper on which he had written a quotation: "Let mercy be our boast, and shame our only fear". (Note: The quotation is from a poem recited by The Rev. Moses Marcus at the 60th Anniversary Dinner of the New York St George's Society on 23 April 1846.)

Among numerous tributes was that of Stackhouse's former associate Baron Klinckowström, who wrote: "It was a fine death he died, the death of a true English gentleman worthy of both names. He was a man, and knew how to die as a man ought to die".

Stackhouse was buried in a Quaker plot in County Cork. Plans for the International Oceanographic Expedition died with him; Discovery remained, unused, at her berth at London's West India Dock, the balance on her purchase price still outstanding. She was eventually reclaimed by the Hudson's Bay Company, who kept the deposit to cover the ongoing costs of maintaining the ship while waiting for Stackhouse.

== Notes and references ==
=== Sources ===
Books

- Carpenter, Leonard (2017). Lusitania Lost. Coral Gables, FL: Mango publishing Group. ISBN 978-1-63353-656-2.
- Ellis, Frederick D. (1915). The Tragedy of the Lusitania. Philadelphia, PA: National Publishing Co. OCLC 5360457.
- Headland, R.K. (1989). Chronological List of Antarctic Expeditions and Related Historical Events. Cambridge: Cambridge University Press. ISBN 0-521-30903-4.
- Huntford, Roland (1985). Shackleton. London: Hodder & Stoughton. ISBN 0-340-25007-0.
- Huxley, Leonard, ed. (1913). Scott's Last Expedition, Volume I: Being the Journals of Captain R.F. Scott, RN CVO. London: Smith, Elder & Co. OCLC 1522514.
- "Jan Mayen". Encyclopaedia Britannica, 14th edition. Vol. 12. London: The Encyclopaedia Britannica Co. Ltd. 1932. OCLC 888776014.
- Kruse, Frigga (2014). Frozen Assets: British mining, exploration, and geopolitics on Spitsbergen, 1904–53. Groningen: University of Groningen. ISBN 978-9-491-43133-3.
- Preston, Diana (2011). Wilful Murder: The Sinking Of The Lusitania. London: Corgi Books. ISBN 978-1-446-42346-2.
- Savours, Ann (2001). The Voyages of the Discovery. London: Chatham Publishing. ISBN 1-86176-149-X.
- Scott, Robert Falcon; Jones, Max (2005). Journals: Captain Scott's Last Expedition. Oxford: Oxford University Press. ISBN 978-0-19-929752-8.
- Smith, Michael (2019). Shackleton: By Endurance we Conquer. London: OneWorld Publications. ISBN 978-1-78074-707-1.

Journals

- Hornik, Helmut; Lüdecke, Cornelia (2–3 June 2005). Wilhelm Filchner and Antarctica. 1st SCAR Workshop on the History of Antarctic Research. Bavarian Academy of Sciences and Humanities. pp. 55–61. Archived from the original on 1 November 2020.
- Nordenskjöld, Otto; Palander, Louis (May 1914). "The Plan for a New Anglo-Swedish Antarctic Expedition". The Geographical Journal. 43 (5): 554–558. Bibcode:1914GeogJ..43..554P. doi:10.2307/1778303. JSTOR 1778303.
- Paterson, A.D., ed. (1846). "St George's Society of New York, Sixtieth Anniversary". The Anglo-American. 7. New York: E.L. Garvin: 18–19.
- Russell, W.S.C. (1911). "Jan Mayen Expedition of 1911". Bulletin of the American Geographical Society of New York (1901-1915). 43 (1).
- "Stackhouse's Antarctic Expedition". Bulletin of the American Geographical Society. 46 (4): 286–294. 1914. JSTOR 201313.
- "The International Oceanographic Expedition". Science. 40 (1042): 883–884. 18 December 1914. Bibcode:1914Sci....40..883.. doi:10.1126/science.40.1042.883. PMID 17809849. (subscription required)
- Wordie, James (March 1922). "Jan Mayen Island". The Geographical Journal. 59 (3): 180–194. Bibcode:1922GeogJ..59..180W. doi:10.2307/1781757. JSTOR 1781757.

Dissertations

- Cardone, Ignacio Javier (2019). A continent for peace and science: Antarctic science and international politics from the Sixth International Geographical Congress to the Antarctic Treaty (1895–1959) (PhD). University of Sao Paulo and King's College, London.
- Watling, Louise (2009). An analysis of the presentation and portrayal of Petty Officer Edgar Evans, the first man to perish in Captain Scott's Pole party of 1912 (M.Phil). Scott Polar Research Institute, University of Cambridge.

Newspapers

- "British Antarctic Expedition". The Examiner. Launceston, Tasmania. 16 February 1914. p. 6.
- "Continuation of Captain's Scott's Work". The Manchester Guardian. 7 November 1913. p. 6.
- "Disaster halts Titanic Quest". The Washington Herald. 10 May 1915. p. 10.
- "Stackhouse Polar Trip Postponed". The New York Times. 18 April 1914. p. 4.
- "The Icy South: Stackhouse Expedition's Plans". The (Queensland) Warwick Examiner and Times. 4 May 1914. p. 3.
- "The Stackhouse Expedition to Start in December". The Advertiser, Adelaide. 17 June 1914. p. 16.
- "Warning from Germans about traveling on British and Allied ships prior to sinking of Lusitania". The Brooklyn Daily Eagle. 1 May 1915. p. 12.

Websites

- Paulson, Bryanna (2019). "A Brief History of Oceanography". Algae Research Supply.
- "Austro-Hungarian Arctic Expedition on Jan Mayen 1882–83". The Royal Society.
- "Commander Joseph Foster Stackhouse". Imperial War Museum (GB). 1915.
- "Five Ways to Compute the Relative Value of a UK Pound Amount, 1270 to Present". Measuringworth.
- "Jan Mayen Expedition, 1911". Christie's. 2003.
- "Lusitania: life, loss, legacy". Merseyside Maritime Museum.
- "Parnell, Henry Bligh Fortesque (sic)". Commonwealth War Graves Commission.
- "Saloon (First Class) Passenger List". The Lusitania Resource. 28 October 2010.
