= Erich Przybyllok =

German astronomer and physicist

Erich Przybyllok (30 June 1880 – 11 September 1954) was a German astronomer and physicist, who was a member of the scientific staff on Wilhelm Filchner's Second German Antarctic Expedition, 1911–13. After studies at Freiburg and receiving his doctorate in 1904, Przybyllock worked as a researcher at various observatories before joining Filchner's expedition. In 1921, after the First World War, he was appointed professor of astronomy at the University of Königsberg, holding the post until the university was destroyed by bombing in 1944. Afterwards he retired to Cologne.
