= Felix König =

Austrian scientist, alpinist and explorer

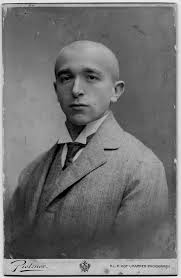
Felix König

Felix König (born c.1880) was an Austrian scientist, alpinist and Antarctic explorer. He was a member of Wilhelm Filchner's Second German Antarctic Expedition, 1911–1913, which failed in its attempt to determine the nature of the link, if any, between the Weddell Sea and the Ross Sea, and thereby resolve the question as to whether the continent was a single landmass or a group of several elements. In the course of the expedition König, along with Filchner, was part of the group, that disproved the existence of the land known as New South Greenland, or "Morrell's Land", supposedly discovered in 1823 by the American sealer captain, Benjamin Morrell.

On his return to Austria, König sought to continue Filchner's unfinished work, and for this purpose organised an Austrian Antarctic Expedition, which he hoped would depart in the summer of 1914. However, he found that his plans conflicted with those of Ernest Shackleton, who was concurrently preparing the Imperial Trans-Antarctic Expedition on similar lines. Attempts to reconcile the two ventures failed; in the event, König's expedition was abandoned in August 1914 on the outbreak of the First World War, in which he served as an officer in the Austrian army. He was captured, and spent most of the conflict as a prisoner-of-war in Siberia. He never returned to the Antarctic.

== Personal background ==
Felix König, born around 1880, (Note: Available sources do not record König's date of birth, but Michael Smith, Shackleton's biographer, gives his age as 33 in 1913–14.) was a scientist and alpinist from Graz in Austria. He had acquired some experience of the Arctic in Greenland, and in 1911 he was invited to join Wilhelm Filchner's Second German Antarctic Expedition, 1911–1913.

== In the Antarctic, 1911–1913 ==
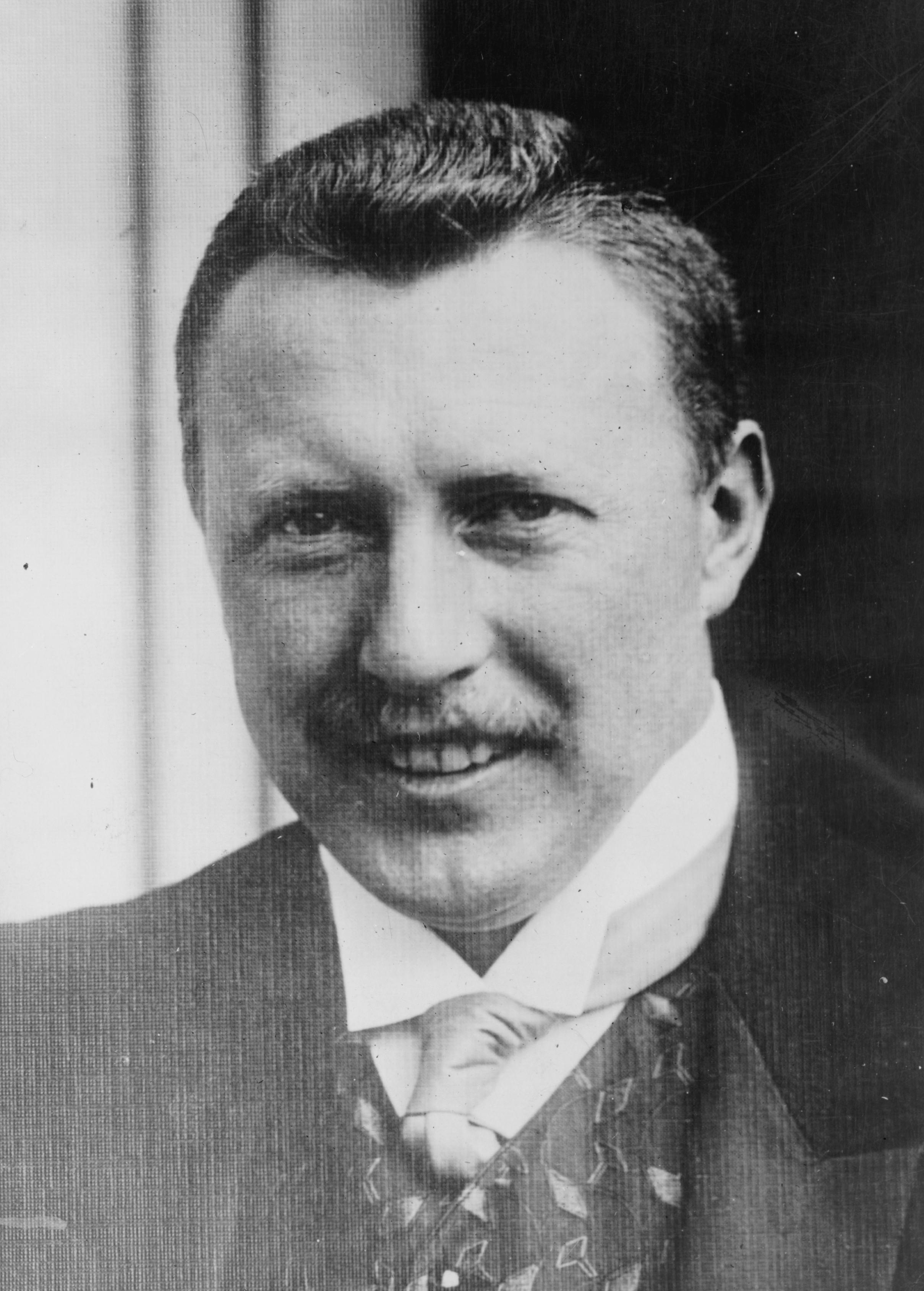
Wilhelm Filchner

The main geographical objective of this expedition was to determine the relationship between the eastern and western landmasses of Antarctica; were they connected by land, or were there two landmasses separated by water? The expedition would involve travel over uncharted terrain, in which König's alpine experiences might be a valuable asset.

The expedition ship, Deutschland, entered the Weddell Sea in January 1912, and penetrated to 77°44'S. The ship reached an inlet, which Filchner named Vahsel Bay, after Deutschland's captain, Richard Vahsel. Here he set attempted to up his Weddell Sea base camp, unfortunately on insecure ice; changes in the winds and tides caused the berg to break free, carrying the camp with it. Most of its equipment was retrieved, but after several attempts to re-establish the base the ship became caught in the ice and began to drift northwards. The expedition then endured a long, frustrating winter trapped in the Weddell Sea ice.

The question as to whether overall control of the expedition lay with Filchner, or with the more experienced Vahsel – he had been second officer on the Gauss Expedition of 1901–03 – had not been satisfactorily resolved, and created a situation of divided command. Factions formed behind these alternative leaders, followed by animosities and threats of violence. König, firmly aligned with Filchner, alleged that he had been shot at; Filchner slept behind locked doors with a loaded pistol by his side, for protection.

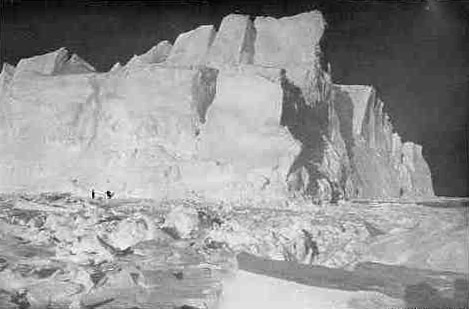
Weddell Sea iceberg in the region of supposed "New South Greenland"

During the course of the winter drift, König participated with Filchner in an ice journey to investigate the location of land reportedly sighted by the American sealer Benjamin Morrell in 1823. This involved a hazardous trek over nearly 40 miles of treacherous sea ice. They found no trace of the land, and depth soundings confirmed that there was no land nearby.

Deutschland finally escaped from the ice in late October 1912, and reached South Georgia on 19 December. Here, the expedition dissolved; back in Germany, Filchner was largely exonerated from blame for the debacle, but had lost his taste for polar exploration, and decided to return to his original field of work, in Central and East Asia.

== Proposed Austrian Antarctic Expedition ==
Back in Austria, and undiscouraged by Filchner's failures, König was ready to return to the Antarctic to continue the work. He began to organise the Austrian Antarctic Expedition, and with the backing of the influential Count Johann Wilczek, was able to buy Deutschland, the name of which he changed to Osterreich. His plans were supported by Filchner and, among others, Roald Amundsen and Otto Nordenskjöld. König also obtained the blessing of the Austrian imperial family.

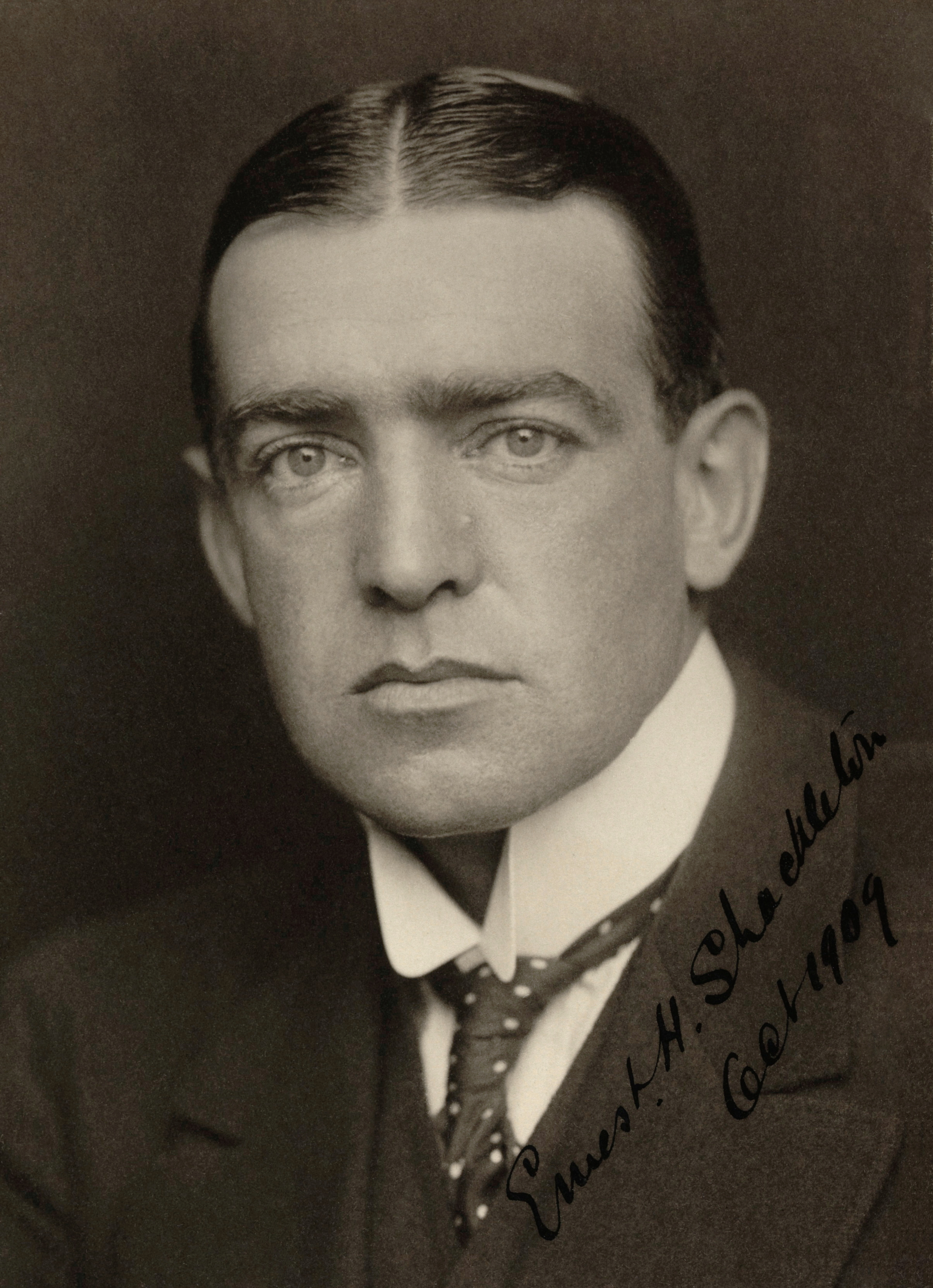
Ernest Shackleton

However, König faced competition. Since his return in from his polar near-miss in 1909, Ernest Shackleton had been considering a further journey south. In March 1912 he learned that Amundsen had reached the South Pole. With that goal removed, the idea of a trans-Antarctic crossing became his objective, something he had previously discussed with William Speirs Bruce, leader of the erstwhile Scottish National Antarctic Expedition 1902–1904, whose own plans to make such a crossing had been stalled by lack of finance. When, in January 1913, Shackleton learned that Filchner had failed in his principal objective, he felt free to develop his own scheme, based on the establishment of winter quarters in Vahsel Bay.

Meanwhile, in Austria, König formally revealed his plans to a committee meeting of the Austrian Geographical Society in January 1914. The 1914 meeting noted that Shackleton was proposing a similar plan, meaning that two expeditions, with broadly similar objectives, would be operating in the same area of the Antarctic at the same time. König's reaction was to claim that Filchner had transferred to him his rights of priority in the Vahsel Bay area, and that Shackleton should therefore go elsewhere. The former president of the Royal Geographical Society, Sir Clements Markham, still an influential figure, concurred: "One has to leave the area to König where he has worked in former times". This stance was similar to what Shackleton had experienced with Captain Scott, prior to the Nimrod Expedition in 1907, when Scott had claimed priority in the McMurdo Sound area of the Ross Sea and demanded that Shackleton find another base. Shackleton then had reluctantly deferred to Scott only to be forced by circumstances, when in the Antarctic, to break his promise and establish his base within McMurdo Sound. Now, Shackleton was determined he would not yield, and informed the Royal Geographical Society: "I have as much right to use Vahsel Bay as Dr. König ... I cannot alter plans I have long since formulated".

As the scheduled departure dates of both expeditions approached in the summer of 1914, attempts were made to get the two ventures to either combine or at least cooperate. Filchner invited Shackleton to Berlin, to discuss the situation, but Shackleton was too distracted by last-minute preparations for his expedition, and could not find the time. He suggested that König should come to London. Events were then overtaken by the crisis developing in Europe; on 3 August, with war imminent, Shackleton's ship Endurance was moored at Ramsgate, awaiting instructions from the Admiralty. There, he received from the First Lord of the Admiralty, Winston Churchill, the one-word instruction "Proceed". As König waited with his ship in Trieste harbour on the outbreak of war, he was ordered to abandon his expedition.

== First World War ==
König joined the Austrian army, fought in Galicia, and in September 1915 was captured and sent to Krasnoyarsk in Siberia as a prisoner of war. During his long captivity, the scientific community made unavailing attempts to secure his release. König finally escaped in June 1918, but never returned to the Antarctic. His name, however, is perpetuated in the region by the König Glacier in South Georgia, named in 1929 by a German expedition to the island. Osterreich was requisitioned for use by the Austro-Hungarian Navy as a minesweeper, and served until she was sunk by a torpedo in the Adriatic Sea in 1917. (Note: Two further Antarctic expeditions were cancelled at the outbreak of war: a joint Anglo-Swedish enterprise sponsored by Louis Palander and Otto Nordenskjöld; and a British expedition to King Edward VII Land in the Discovery, to be led by Joseph Foster Stackhouse.)

== Notes and references ==
=== Sources ===
==== Books ====
- Barr, William (2007). "German South Polar (Deutschland) Expedition 1911–1912". In Riffenburgh, Beau (ed.). Encyclopedia of the Antarctic. Vol. 1. New York and Abingdon: Routledge. pp. 453–455. ISBN 978-0-41597-024-2.
- Bryan, Rorke (2011). Ordeal by Ice: Ships of the Antarctic. Dobbs Ferry, NY: Sheridan House. ISBN 978-1-57409-312-4.
- Fisher, Margery; Fisher, James (1957). Shackleton. London: J. M. Barrie. OCLC 696046516.
- Huntford, Roland (1985). Shackleton. London: Hodder and Stoughton. ISBN 0-340-25007-0.
- Mills, William James (2003). Exploring Polar Frontiers: A Historical Encyclopedia. Santa Barbara, CA; Denver, CO; Oxford, England: ABC-CLIO. ISBN 1-57607-422-6.
- Rabasssa, Jorge; Borla, Maria (2006). Antarctic Peninsula & Tierra del Fuego: 100 years of Swedish-Argentine scientific cooperation at the end of the world. London: Taylor & Francis. ISBN 978-0-415-41379-4.
- Riffenburgh, Beau (2005). Nimrod: Ernest Shackleton and the Extraordinary Story of the 1907–09 British Antarctic Expedition. London: Bloomsbury Publishing. ISBN 978-0-7475-7253-4.
- Riffenburgh, Beau (Introduction); Shackleton, Ernest (2007). The Heart of the Antarctic and South. Ware, Hertfordshire: Wordsworth Editions. ISBN 978-1-84022-616-4.
- Savours, Ann (2001). The Voyages of the Discovery. London: Chatham Publishing. ISBN 1-86176-149-X.
- Smith, Michael (2019). Shackleton: By Endurance we Conquer. London: OneWorld Publications. ISBN 978-1-78074-707-1.
- Turney, Chris (2012). 1912: The Year the World Discovered Antarctica. London: The Bodley Head. ISBN 978-1-84792-174-1.

==== Journals ====
- Filchner, Wilhelm; Przybyllok, Erich (1913). "The German Antarctic Expedition". Bulletin of the American Geographical Society. 45 (6). American Geographical Society: 423–430. doi:10.2307/200593. JSTOR 200593. S2CID 4033913.
- "Geographical Record: Polar". Bulletin of the American Geographical Society. 45 (9). American Geographical Society: 691. 1913. JSTOR 200530.
- Lüdecke, Cornelia (2005). "Antarectic Research: No Longer a Historic Matter in the Scientific Community". Earth Sciences History. 24 (2). History of Earth Sciences Society: 281–286. JSTOR 24136948.
- Rack, Ursula (2014). "As if the Weddell Sea were not Big Enough" (PDF). Antarctic. 32, no. 3 (229). New Zealand Antarctic Society: 33–34.
- Rack, Ursula (24 June 2014). "Felix König and the European Science Community across enemy lines during the First World War (Abstract)". The Polar Journal. 4 (1). Taylor & Francis Online. doi:10.1080/2154896X.2014.913928. S2CID 159652885.

==== Conferences ====
- Hornik, Helmut; Lüdecke, Cornelia (2–3 June 2005). Wilhelm Filchner and Antarctica. 1st SCAR Workshop on the History of Antarctic Research. Bavarian Academy of Sciences and Humanities. pp. 55–61. Archived from the original on 1 November 2020.
- Rack, Ursula (11 April 2018). Cold cases in Antarctic history. SPRI: Friends of Scott Polar Research Institute lecture series. University of Cambridge.

==== Websites ====
- "Antarctica Detail, ID 8142". United States Geological Survey (USGS).
- "Antarctic Explorers: Wilhelm Filchner 1877–1957". South-Pole.com.
- Lüdecke, Cornelia (2019). "Filchner, Wilhelm 1877–1875". Dictionary of Falklands Biography.
