= Second German Antarctic Expedition =

Antarctic research expedition

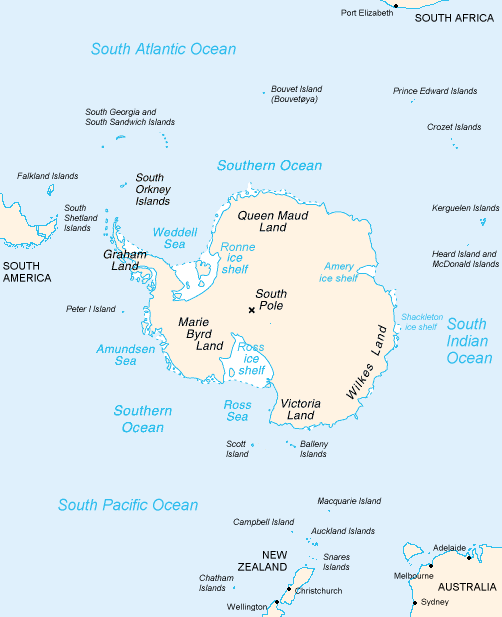
The full physical geography of Antarctica was still unknown in 1911.

The Second German Antarctic Expedition of 1911–1913 was led by Wilhelm Filchner in the exploration ship Deutschland. Its principal objective was to determine whether the Antarctic continent comprised a single landmass rather than separated elements, and in particular whether the Weddell Sea and Ross Sea were connected by a strait. In addition, an extensive programme of scientific research was undertaken. The expedition failed to establish a land base, and the ship became beset in the Weddell Sea ice, drifting north for eight months before reaching open water. The expedition was marred by considerable disagreement and animosity among its participants, and broke up in disarray.

The expedition secured the patronage of Luitpold, Prince Regent of Bavaria, who formed a fundraising committee which organised, among other activities, a public lottery. After leaving Germany early in May 1911, the expedition carried out a thorough oceanographic survey of the Atlantic Ocean before arriving in South Georgia in October. Subsequently, despite being hampered by heavy sea ice, Deutschland penetrated the Weddell Sea beyond the southernmost point reached by James Weddell in 1823. It discovered new land which it named Prinzregent Luitpold Land (otherwise "Luitpold Coast"), and reached the southern limit of the Weddell Sea at the Filchner Ice Shelf. Attempts to set up their land base at a small inlet which they named Vahsel Bay failed when they chose a site on insecure ice which broke away, taking the camp with it. Although much equipment was salvaged, further attempts to establish a land base also failed. By then, Deutschland was unable to escape from the ice, and began its long drift northwards.

During the drift, scientific observations continued, and a brief sledge journey showed that the supposed "New South Greenland", reportedly seen by Benjamin Morrell in 1823, did not exist. Morale had meanwhile collapsed, and by the time the ship was freed and reached South Georgia, the expedition was in considerable disarray. Some members returned to Germany forthwith; Filchner hoped, nevertheless, to reconstitute the expedition and return to Antarctica in the following season. However, he was recalled to Germany to explain the expedition's failure to its backers. In the subsequent inquiry, Filchner was largely exonerated, but had lost his taste for Antarctic exploration, and never went again. The First World War deflected interest from the Antarctic, but in due course the expedition's geographical and scientific discoveries were acknowledged and respected. Filchner did not reveal in his lifetime details of the personal antagonisms that marred the expedition, but a memorandum or exposé, written just before his death in 1957, was published in 1985.

== Background: Germany in Antarctica ==
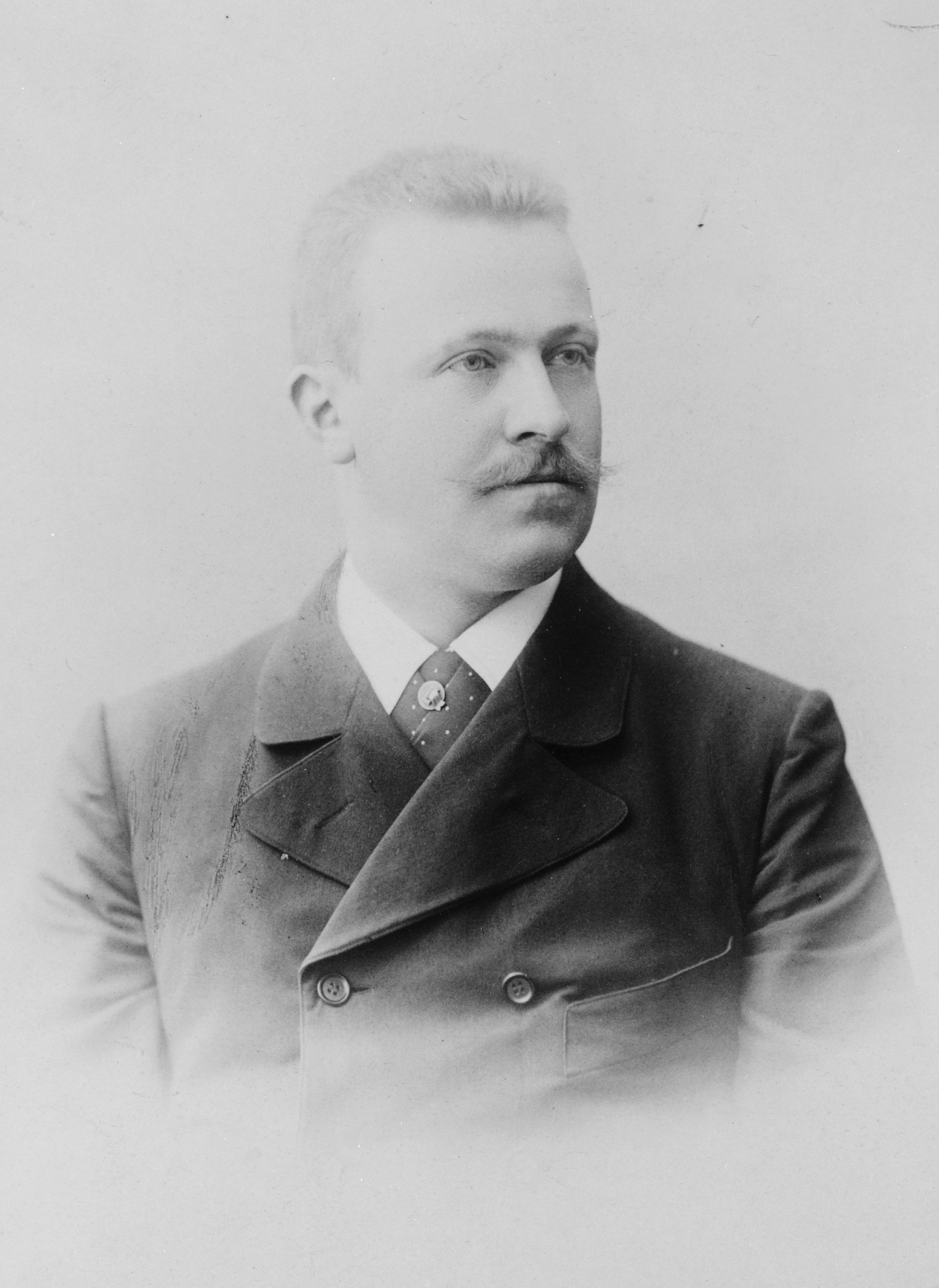
Erich von Drygalski, leader of the first German Antarctic expedition, 1901–03

The first German visit to the sub-Antarctic region occurred during International Polar Year, 1882–83, when a team of scientists established a station at Royal Bay on the island of South Georgia. Over the year they carried out an extensive research programme, and observed the Transit of Venus on 6 December 1882.

By the turn of the 19th and 20th centuries, exploration of the Antarctic mainland had begun in earnest, with expeditions from Belgium, Britain and Sweden. Germany entered the field with the first German Antarctic Expedition, 1901–03, led by Erich von Drygalski in the ship Gauss. Drygalski discovered land south of the Kerguelen Islands, but his ship became trapped in the ice at 66°7'S 89°38'E, while still 85 km (46 nautical miles (nmi) from the land. He named this distant coast Kaiser Wilhelm II Land, and an extinct volcano, also observed, was called Gaussberg. Most of the scientific work of the expedition was carried out in a winter station established on the sea ice. When after more than a year Gauss was freed, Drygalski tried but was unable to take the ship further south. Hence, when he returned to Germany, in an era when geographical achievements were valued more than scientific results, he found that the expedition was compared unfavourably with Robert Falcon Scott's concurrent Discovery Expedition, which had achieved a farthest south mark of 82°17'. Drygalski's scientific results, published over three decades, would retrospectively be recognised as of outstanding importance, but the immediate reaction to his expedition was one of a national failure.

At that time, little was yet known about the nature of the Antarctic continent – whether it was a single landmass, a group of islands or, as the geographer Albrecht Penck believed, two large landmasses, West and East Antarctica, separated by a frozen strait. This issue interested a young army officer and seasoned explorer, Wilhelm Filchner. Born in 1877, Filchner had visited Russia, had ridden on horseback through the Pamir Mountains, and after a period of studies in surveying and geography had led an expedition to Southern China and Tibet in 1903–05. Though lacking in polar experience, Filcher resolved to lead an expedition which would determine the truth or otherwise of Penck's hypothesis.

== Organisation ==
=== Plans and financing ===
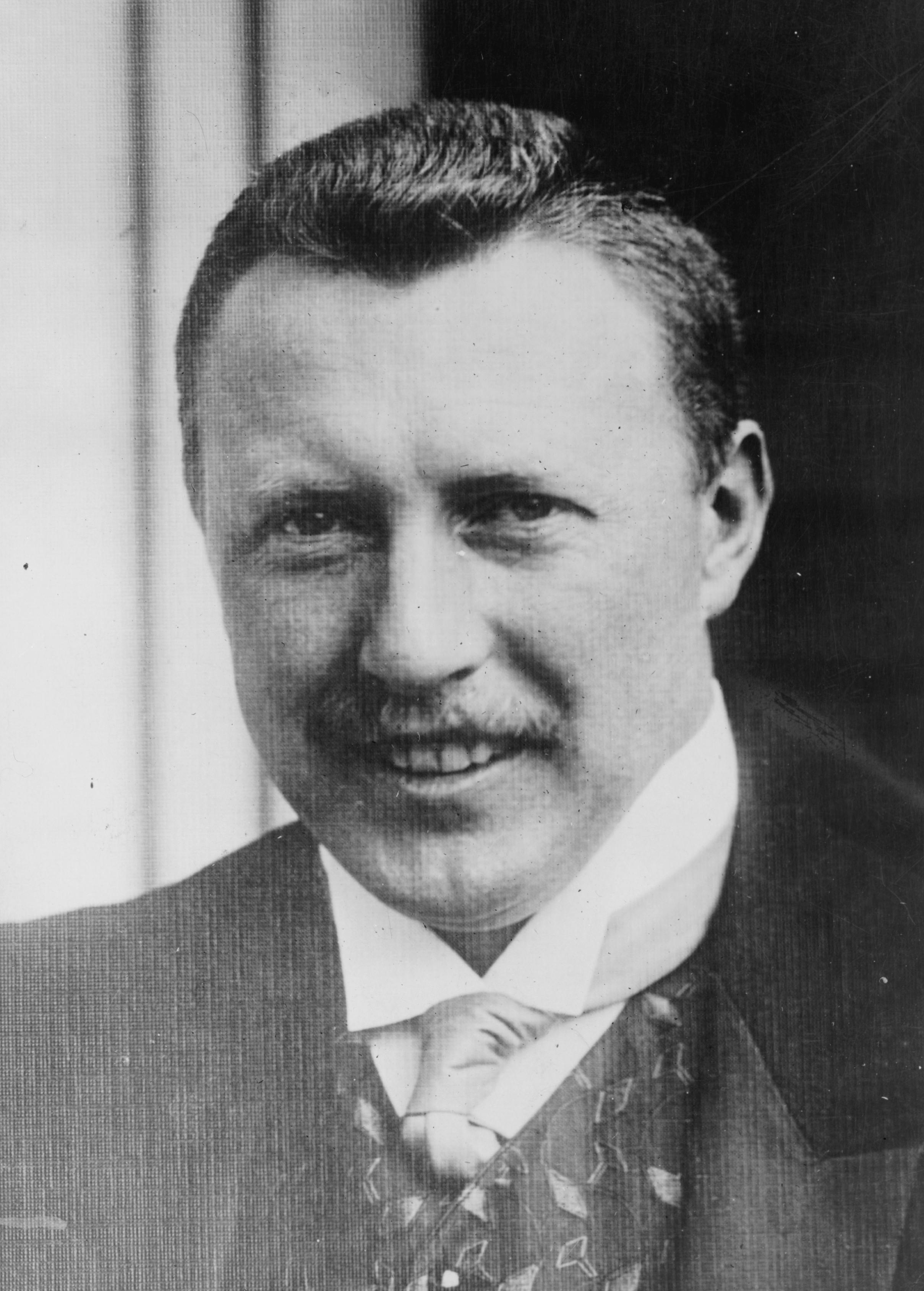
Wilhelm Filchner, the expedition's leader

Filchner's original plan involved a two-ship strategy, in which one party would establish a base in the south Weddell Sea area, while another would go to the Ross Sea, on the opposite side of Antarctica. Shore parties from each group would then cross the terrain, to rendezvous at the Geographic South Pole or thereabouts, thereby resolving the one-or-two landmasses conundrum. The plan, costed at around two million marks (about £97,500), (Note: Around £10 million in 2018 terms.) was received positively by the Berlin Geographical Society in 1909, and was endorsed by Penck. The expedition would also carry out a scientific research programme that included a detailed study of the nature of the oceans, how they linked together in the southern seas, and how they impacted on the world's climate.

Filchner and his backers sought the approval of the Kaiser, necessary if they were to obtain state funding. But when approached, Wilhelm II, who had supported Drygalski's earlier expedition, was dismissive. He thought that Count von Zeppelin's airships would "do in a couple of days what takes you three years". Filchner found his patron in the aged Prince Regent Luitpold of Bavaria, who readily gave his support to the enterprise. The lack of state funding, however, meant that Filchner's plan had to be scaled back; the Ross Sea component had to be given up. Filchner would take a single ship as far south as possible in the largely unexplored Weddell Sea, and concentrate his investigations in that area. The cost of this revised plan was estimated at 1.1 million marks (about £58,500), (Note: Around £6 million in 2018 terms.) and under Luitpold's patronage an organising committee was set up to raise this amount. The most successful of its activities was a public lottery, and by the end of 1910 the required sum had been secured. (Note: This committee of backers formed itself into the "League for the German Antarctic Expedition" (Verein Deutsche Antarktische Expedition) and assumed overall financial responsibility for the expedition. This relieved Filchner from many time-consuming chores, but had the effect of reducing his personal authority, a fact which assumed some relevance during the disputes that arose later.) Although the German government would not provide funding, they were supportive in other ways, arranging for various agencies and organisations to loan essential scientific equipment, and were willing to meet the cost of the harbour fees for the expedition's anticipated lengthy stays in Buenos Aires.

=== Ship ===
Filchner found a suitable ship, the Norwegian-built whaler and sealer Bjørn. In 1907, Ernest Shackleton had wanted her for his forthcoming Antarctic expedition, but the price, £11,000 (roughly £1.1 million in 2018 terms), was too high. Since then, Bjørn had worked in the Arctic under Captain Bjørn Jørgensen, and had acquired a good reputation as an ice ship. The price had risen to £12,700 (£1.3 million), which Filchner nevertheless considered a bargain. The sale completed, the ship was renamed Deutschland, and taken to the Framnaes shipyard in Sandefjord for extensive modification.

According to measurements supplied by the polar historian Rorke Bryan, Deutschland was 48.5 metres (159 ft) in length, with beam 9.02 metres (29.6 ft), and draught 5.49 metres (18.0 ft) forward, 6.56 metres (21.5 ft) aft. Her gross tonnage was 598.2, net 343.8. (Note: The Scientific American, in July 1912, gave different figures for the measurements of Deutschland: length 183.7 ft, beam 34.4 ft, draught 22.6 ft.) Built in 1905 entirely of wood, the outer hull was reinforced with 3¼ inch greenheart sheathing, and the inner hull given a further 6 inches of protection. Rigged as a barque, Deutschland was capable of speeds of 9 or 10 knots under full sail. Her auxiliary engine provided 300 horsepower with a maximum speed of 7.2 knots, consuming coal at a daily rate of 6 tons.

While the ship lay at Sandejford, Shackleton visited to give further advice on the preparation for a long sojourn in the ice. This included the addition of iron plating to protect the stem, and the construction of a well that enabled the propeller and rudder to be lifted on to the deck when not in use. The ship's interior was rebuilt, with sixteen cabins for officers and scientists, and an enlarged fo'c'sle to provide accommodation for the crew. A laboratory for scientific work was built on the main deck, and electric lighting would be provided by a generator.

=== Personnel ===
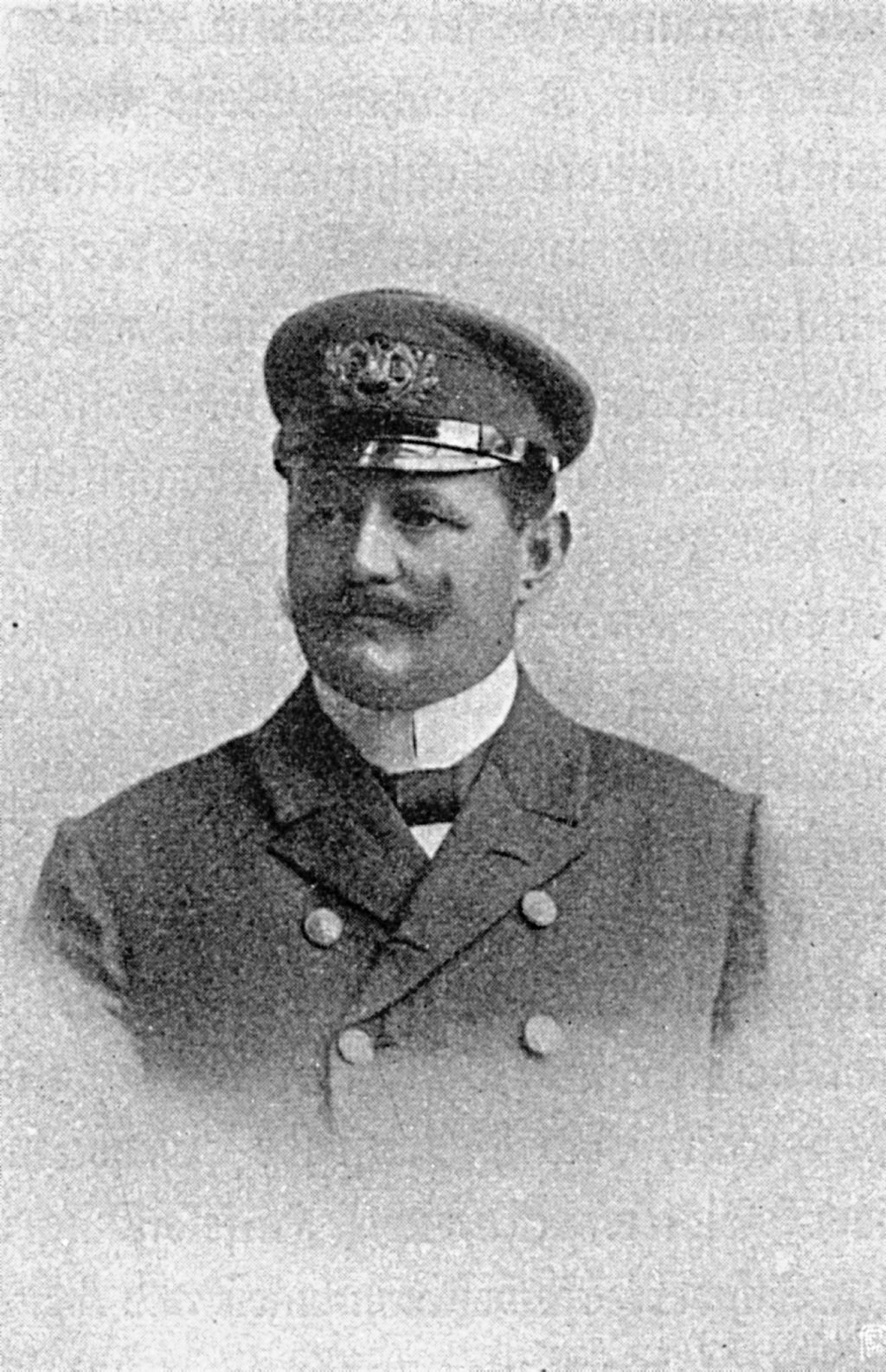
Captain Richard Vahsel

The expedition attracted a large number of applications. Among the scientists selected were a young geographer, Heinrich Seelheim, as Filchner's deputy; Carl Wilhelm Brennecke, one of Germany's leading oceanographers; the astronomer Erich Przybyllok; and an Austrian biologist and experienced alpinist, Felix König. Filchner wanted Jorgensen, Deutschland's former commander, as captain, but was pressurised by the German naval authorities to appoint a German to the post. Their choice was Richard Vahsel, who had served as second officer on the Gauss expedition. Although Drygalski strongly recommended him, Gauss's former captain, Hans Ruser, warned that Vahsel was "greedy for power and an out-and-out schemer". Filchner's agreement to this appointment was, according to Bryan, "a disastrous mistake". Vahsel had a drink problem and an aggressive manner; he was also ill with an advanced form of syphilis, which may have affected his behaviour. He brought with him several officers and crew from the Gauss, forming a clique that would eventually poison relationships throughout the expedition.

Vahsel's position was strengthened by Filchner's agreement to sail under the German naval flag, placing Deutschland under naval regulations that gave the captain supreme decision-making authority. The expedition was thus afflicted from the start by what Roald Amundsen would later describe as a fateful weakness, that of a divided command. Vahsel was quick to flaunt his apparent advantage, boasting while drunk that he would clap Filchner in irons if he didn't toe the line. Filchner chose to disregard this threat as a "tasteless slip".

Aware that his scientists lacked experience of polar conditions, in August 1910 Filchner led a training expedition to Svalbard (Spitsbergen). He and six others crossed the glaciers of central Spitsbergen, in tough conditions. It was also a work-out for the equipment. However, apart from Filchner, only two of the Svalbard party – Przybyllock and the meteorologist Erich Barkow – eventually made the journey to the Antarctic.

== Expedition ==
=== Germany to Buenos Aires ===
In early May, 1911, Deutschland sailed from Bremerhaven, bound for Buenos Aires. Filchner remained in Germany to deal with outstanding expedition business, and would join the expedition in Argentina. Meanwhile, Seelheim acted as scientific director. The voyage extended over four months, and covered 10,000 nautical miles (12,000 mi; 19,000 km) with stops at the Azores, at St Paul's Rocks and at Pernambuco. Around 100 oceanographic studies were carried out, special attention being given to the confluence of the warm Brazil Current and the cold Falklands Current. Deutschland arrived in Buenos Aires on 7 September.

Although successful from a scientific standpoint, the voyage was marred by personal disagreements; Seelheim and Vahsel argued constantly. While en route to Buenos Aires in the steamer Cap Ortega, Filchner received a message that Vahsel was resigning. He then persuaded Alfred Kling, Cap Ortega's first officer, to accept the captaincy of Deutschland, but on arrival found Vahsel still in post and Seelheim gone. Nevertheless, Kling agreed to remain with the expedition as an extra watch-keeping officer. In Buenos Aires, the expedition received a consignment of Greenland dogs, and a number of Manchurian ponies; Filchner had been persuaded by Shackleton of the usefulness of horses as pack animals.

While in Buenos Aires, Deutschland was joined by Fram, Amundsen's ship, returning from the Antarctic after depositing Amundsen and his shore party at the Bay of Whales in Antarctica, prior to their successful attempt on the South Pole. The men from the two ships fraternised well – Deutschland's crew contained a number of Scandinavians – and the crew of Fram gave a rousing send-off when Deutschland departed for South Georgia on 4 October.

=== South Georgia ===
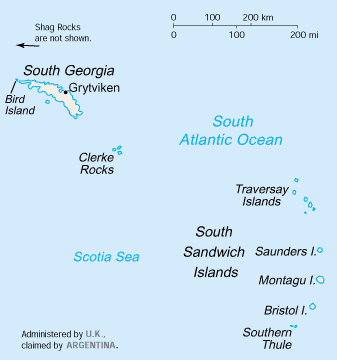
South Georgia and the South Sandwich Islands

Deutschland arrived in Grytviken, South Georgia, on 21 October, to be welcomed by Carl Anton Larsen, the manager of the whaling station there. As the seas to the south remained icebound, Filchner embarked on a coastal survey of South Georgia, with the help of Larsen who lent his yacht Undine for this task. In the course of these surveys they revisited the now derelict research station at Royal Bay, reopened it, and kept it manned for a month while taking regular readings to determine magnetic field changes in the intervening years. While the coastal survey progressed, Deutschland went on a journey to the South Sandwich Islands, to test the theory of the British explorer William Speirs Bruce, that the islands in the so-called Scotia Arc were geologically linked with the Antarctic Peninsula and the South American mainland. The trip was blighted by bad weather and rough seas, with waves reaching 20 metres (66 ft) in height. The ship proved her seaworthiness, but no landing was made, and little scientific work could be done.

In South Georgia, the expedition suffered two losses of personnel. One of the two medical doctors, Ludwig Kohl, was stricken with appendicitis and had to remain on the island. More tragic was the fate of the third officer, Walter Slossarczyk, who disappeared while fishing in King Edward Cove, off Grytviken. His empty boat was later found in Cumberland Bay. Whether this was an accident or, as some suspected, a suicide, was never established. Either way, Filchner considered the death a bad omen for the expedition.

=== Weddell Sea voyage ===
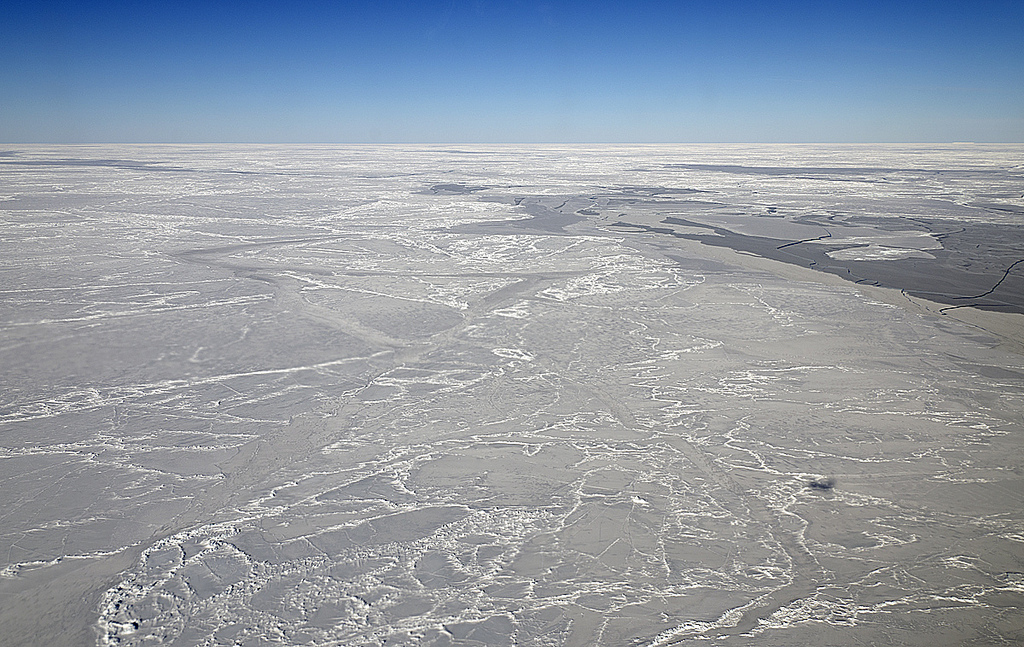
Weddell Sea ice, with leads of open water

Having been restocked with equipment, the now heavily loaded Deutschland left Grytviken on 11 December 1911 carrying 35 men, 8 ponies, 75 Greenland dogs, 2 oxen, 2 pigs and several sheep. She first encountered ice three days out from Grytviken, at 57°S, and from then on, progress southwards was intermittent, with ice-bound periods interspersed with stretches of open water. Between 17 and 31 December, a mere 31 nautical miles (36 mi; 57 km) were covered, and the generator was switched off to save coal. On 14 January 1912, at 70°47'S, the ship was trapped in solid ice, but four days later she enjoyed one of her best day's run, covering 51 nautical miles (59 mi; 94 km). On 27 January, now deep into the Weddell Sea, came the first intimation of land; seabed samples produced blue clay, remnants of glacial deposits that would not be found far from shore. On 28 January a wide stretch of water appeared, extending southward to the horizon: "No one had expected an open Weddell Sea behind a pack ice girdle of roughly 1,100 nautical miles", wrote Filchner.

By 29 January, the ship was beyond the location of Bruce's 1904 sighting of Coats Land, and had passed Weddell's southernmost mark of 74°15'S. The water was now becoming rapidly shallower in depth, showing the imminent approach of land; light surf was visible in the distance to the south. The next day land was observed in the form of ice cliffs, up to 30 metres (98 ft) in height, behind which rose a gentle slope of ice and snow to a height of above 600 metres (2,000 ft). "Under this mass of ice", wrote Filchner, "undoubtedly lay hidden the Antarctic continent". This first geographical discovery of the expedition was named by Filchner as "Prinzregent Luitpold Land" (or "Luitpold Coast"), after the expedition's principal patron.

Following the coastline as it first tended south-westwards, then west and north-west, on 31 January at 77°48'S, they discovered a vast ice barrier, evidently the southern boundary of the Weddell Sea. Filchner christened it the Kaiser Wilhelm Ice Barrier; later, at the Kaiser's insistence, it was renamed after Filchner. (Note: To the west of the Filchner Ice Shelf, partially separated from it by the ice-covered Berkner Island, lies the Ronne Ice Shelf, discovered by the American explorer Finn Ronne. The names of the two shelves are generally combined, as the Filchner–Ronne Ice Shelf.) At the conjunction of Luitpold Land and the ice barrier was a small inlet, which Filchner named Vahsel Bay. Behind the bay, nunataks (protruding rocks) confirmed the presence of land south of the bay.

=== At Vahsel Bay ===
Filchner landed survey parties at Vahsel Bay, to examine the location as a possible landing site, and they reported that it looked feasible. However, Vahsel showed a reluctance to make a landing there, arguing that, having passed Weddell's southern limit, the main task of the expedition was now done and they should return to South Georgia. This, as David Murphy in his expedition account observes, was inexplicable since Deutschland's equipment, provisions and animals clearly provided for extensive work on shore. On 1 February, hoping to resolve the impasse, Filchner agreed to search along the barrier for a better landing place, but none could be found, and by 5 February Deutschland was back at Vahsel Bay.

Vahsel wanted the camp placed on a large and durable-looking iceberg attached to the ice shelf, which the ship could reach easily. Filchner preferred to have the camp further from the ice edge, and only agreed to Vahsel's wish after the captain assured him that the expedition's ice pilot, Paul Björvik, had approved the site. The unloading process began on 9 February and continued over the next several days. By 17 February the hut had been erected and most of the equipment and animals had been transferred to the iceberg. Meanwhile, Filchner learned from Björvik that he had not been consulted, and would not have recommended the site which he described as "very bad".

On 18 February a high spring tide caused a surge of water, which sundered the iceberg from the ice barrier and sent it floating into the Weddell Sea. A frantic process of recovery began, as the ship's lifeboats were used to retrieve as much as possible from the base. By this means, most of the material was saved. Filchner continued his efforts to establish a shore base, and on 28 February, Brenneke and the geologist Fritz Heim were landed on the barrier and began to erect a depot some 600 metres (2,000 ft) from the edge, and about 100 metres (330 ft) above sea level. However, Vahsel was by now insistent that the ship return to South Georgia before being irretrievably frozen in. Filchner reluctantly accepted this; the depot was marked with black flags to await the expedition's return in the following season.

=== Drift ===
On 4 March the ship turned north, and the journey back to South Georgia began. Progress was initially minimal; on 6 March, under full steam, Deutschland advanced just 3 nautical miles (3.5 mi; 5.6 km), and by 15 March she was trapped firmly. Efforts to free her with dynamite failed, and Filchner resigned himself to a long winter's drift: "We now devoted ourselves to scientific work", he wrote. A research station was set up on the ice for meteorological and magnetic work, and the wildlife – penguins, other birds, whales and seals – was observed, recorded and sometimes eaten. A programme of entertainment and sporting activities was maintained on the ship and on the ice, but these diversions could not overcome the increasing divisions and hostility between the opposing groups, worsened by the excessive use of alcohol. The debacle at Vahsel Bay had destroyed morale, and there were long mutual recriminations.

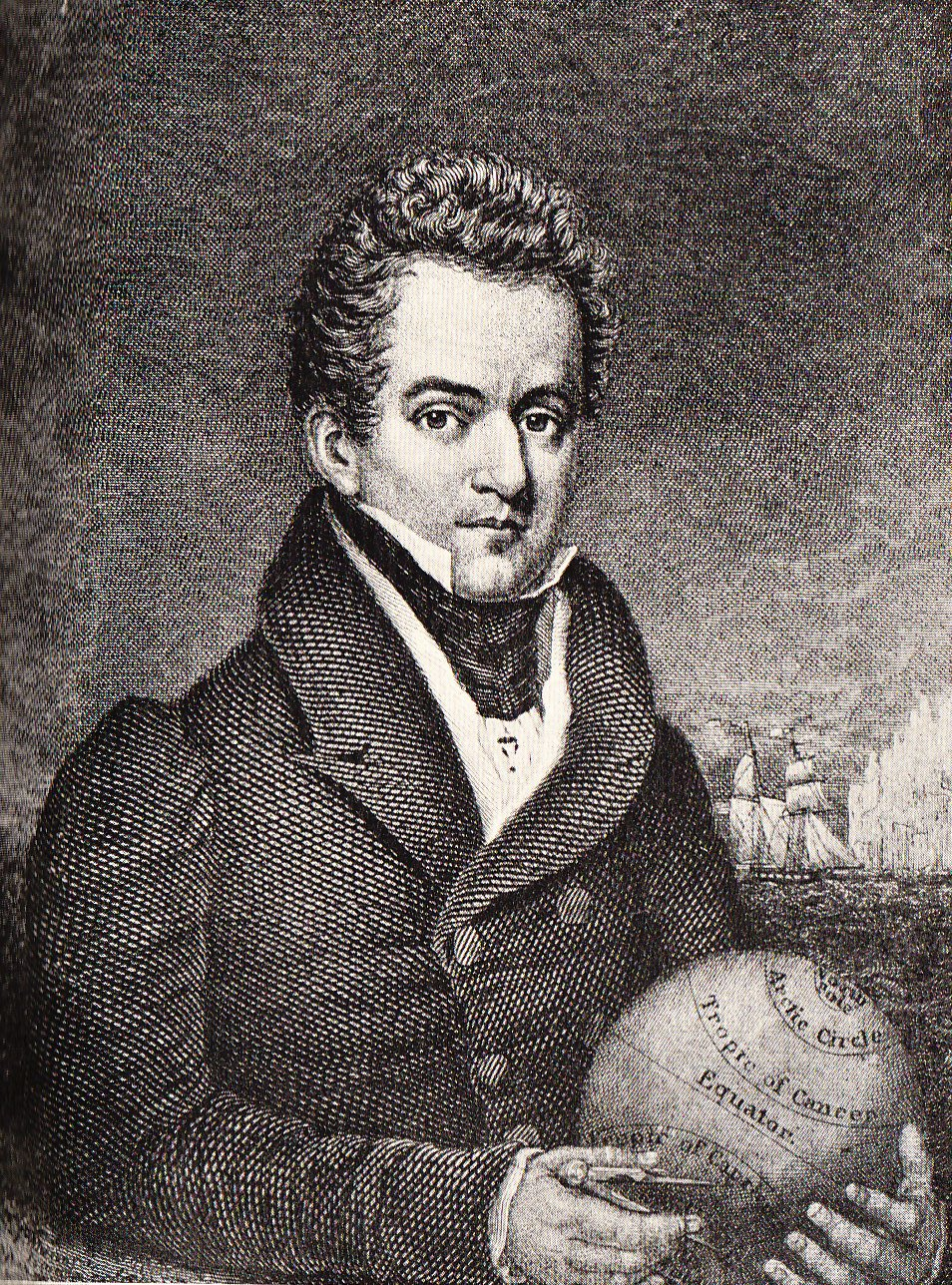
Benjamin Morrell, who described "New South Greenland" in 1823

In June, Filchner was desperate to escape from the poisonous ambience of Deutschland. He calculated that the drift was taking them close to where, in 1823, the American sealing captain Benjamin Morrell claimed to have encountered land, known generally as "Morrell's Land" or "New South Greenland". Morrell described a long stretch of coastline, with distant snow-covered mountains, abundant seal, and "oceanic birds of every description". Morrell's writings were typically full of exaggerations and provable errors, and he had a reputation for vagueness concerning positions and dates, but his claims had remained uninvestigated. Filchner saw an opportunity of adding to his expedition's achievements by proving or disproving the existence of Morrell's Land.

On 23 June, about 65 kilometres (40 mi; 65 km) east of Morrell's reported sighting, Filchner, König and Kling set out from Deutschland with supplies, sledges and dogs to find the spot, travelling much of the time by moonlight. The terrain was difficult; shifting ice with open water, and piled-up ice floes. Another problem was that the drifting ship would be in a different position when they returned. As they approached the location of Morrell's supposed sighting, they dropped lead weights to test the sea depth. Finding no evidence of shoals, and no visible signs of land, they concluded that Morrell had most likely seen a mirage. On the return journey, through skilful navigation, they intercepted Deutschland on 30 June; it had drifted a distance of 60 kilometres (37 mi; 60 km) since they left.

On 8 August, Vahsel died, his health having recently deteriorated. He was buried in the ice two days later, and was succeeded as captain by Wilhelm Lorenzen, the first officer. The atmosphere did not improve; Lorenzen was no conciliator, and his relationship with Filchner was no better than Vahsel's had been. The mood rapidly became not merely unpleasant but dangerous; guns were being waved around, with threats of shooting – König claimed he had been shot at. Filchner considered his own life at risk, and slept with a loaded gun by his side. The drift continued; by mid-September, open leads were appearing in the distance, but it was not until 26 November, with the help of dynamite, that Deutschland finally broke free of the ice. The drift had provided initial evidence for the existence of the Weddell Gyre, a circulating ocean current rotating clockwise round the sea. A slow run through heavy loose pack finally brought Deutschland to Grytviken on 19 December 1912.

=== Dissolution ===
In Grytviken, open fighting broke out among the two factions. The crew had heard a rumour that they would not be paid, and turned on Filchner. When Larsen's attempts to mediate failed, he housed the more mutinous members in the whaling station before sending them home on a steamer. As replacement captain Filchner appointed Kling, who took Deutschland to Buenos Aires, where she was temporarily lent to the Argentine government to relieve the Argentinian weather station at Laurie Island.

Filchner, at this stage, had not given up on continuing his expedition. He informed the American Geographical Society that, after a period in dry dock for essential work, "...the second trip to the newly discovered land can be made again, and the explorations in the Antarctic continued according to the original program". However, the dissident members who had returned to Germany reported poor leadership and morale, and the organising committee ordered Filchner home. There, he faced a Court of Honour which, after hearing the various accusations and testimonies of witnesses, largely absolved him from blame. His opponents continued to denounce him; when von Goeldel, the former ship's doctor, called Filchner dishonourable, Filchner challenged him to a duel, and von Goeldel withdrew the comment.

Despite his official vindication, Filchner was wearied of the Antarctic, and never returned. Deutschland was acquired by König, who was organising an Austrian expedition to complete the work begun by the German expedition. Filchner was invited to join him, but declined; he likewise refused an invitation from Amundsen to accompany him on an expedition to the North Pole. He wrote: "Many experiences had convinced me that truly great successes in the polar ice are granted only to members of those nations where polar research has traditions ... I have decided to return to my original field of work: Central and East Asia".

== Aftermath ==
In apportioning responsibility for the perceived failure, Penck and others blamed Vahsel, as did the Kaiser, who had opposed the expedition but now gave Filchner his backing. On the other hand Albert Ballin of the Hamburg America Line, Vahsel's former employers, defended the captain: "The geographical discoveries of the expedition are solely Vahsel's credit, who pursued the goals cited for him with the greatest energy, steadfast loyalty and devotion".

Controversies around the expedition were forgotten with the outbreak of the First World War in August 1914. König's expedition was cancelled, while Deutschland, which König had renamed Osterreich, was requisitioned by the Austro-Hungarian Navy, and used as a minesweeper until she was torpedoed and sunk in the Adriatic Sea.

During the war, Filchner served in the German army. Afterwards, he wrote an account of his expedition, published in 1922, in which he barely mentions the animosities that had affected it. He chose to ignore continuing denigration from his opponents, and resumed his travels, leading expeditions to Central Asia in 1926–28 and 1934–38. His last expedition, to Nepal in 1939, was interrupted by illness and the Second World War, after which he retired to Zurich. Shortly before his death in 1957, Filchner wrote an exposé, not published until 1985, which revealed the truth about his Antarctic expedition's failure.

Shackleton's Imperial Trans-Antarctic Expedition, aiming for a transcontinental crossing, had entered the Weddell Sea in January 1915. Before he could land, his ship Endurance was beset, and carried in the ice by the Weddell Gyre until she was crushed and sunk in October 1915. The expedition thereafter became an epic of survival and rescue. The first land crossing of the Antarctic continent was not achieved until the Commonwealth Trans-Antarctic Expedition of 1957–58. The co-leaders, Vivian Fuchs and Edmund Hillary, followed Filchner's original two-ship plan: starting respectively at the Weddell Sea and Ross Sea, they met at the South Pole on 19 January 1958. They acknowledged Filchner as "the first to reach the head of the Weddell Sea", but they named their Vahsel Bay base camp after Shackleton who they said had "intended to establish his base there".

== Assessment ==
Notwithstanding the sense of failure and recriminations, the Second German Antarctic Expedition recorded some significant geographical achievements. It found new land, the Luitpold Coast, and reached the southern limit of the Weddell Sea. Its discovery of the Filchner Ice Shelf provided strong evidence, if not outright proof, that Penck's theory of a strait separating two Antarctic landmasses was wrong. The winter journey of Filchner, Kling and König proved the non-existence of Morrell's "New South Greenland". There were significant scientific findings, including the first evidence of the clockwise Weddell Sea gyre. The detailed oceanographic investigations revealed the temperature distribution in the waters of the southern Atlantic. Four alternating layers were identified, carrying warmer and colder streams south and north respectively, a process in which the Weddell Sea played a central role.

Owing to the commencement of the First World War, and the lack of a formal presentation of the results, the expedition's findings made little immediate impact on the international scientific community. However, the Alfred Wegener Institute for Polar and Marine Research later rated the expedition's discoveries as equal with those of James Clark Ross in the 1840s, and in later years the Weddell Sea became the most favoured area for German polar research.

The expedition's personnel are honoured in the naming of various geographical features in the Antarctic region. As well as the Filchner Ice Shelf and Vahsel Bay, these include the Filchner Trench, on the seabed in the south-eastern corner of the Weddell Sea; the Filchner Mountains in Queen Maud Land, named by a later German expedition in 1938–39; the Filchner Rocks in South Georgia, charted during the 1911 coastal survey; Cape Vahsel on South Georgia; the König Glacier, surveyed in 1928–29 during an expedition led by Ludwig Kohl-Larson, formerly a member of Filchner's expedition; and Mount Kling in South Georgia, surveyed and named in the period 1951–57.

== Notes and references ==
=== Sources ===
Books

- Alberts, Fred G., ed. (1981). Geographic Names of the Antarctic. Washington DC: US National Science Foundation. OCLC 497666264.
- Barr, William (2007). "German South Polar (Deutschland) Expedition 1911–12". In Beau Riffenburgh (ed.). Encyclopedia of the Antarctic. Encyclopedia of the Antarctic, Volume 1. New York and London: Routledge. ISBN 978-0-415-97024-2.
- Béchervaise, John (1981). "Davis, John King (1884–1967)". In Bede Nairn; Geoffrey Serle (eds.). Australian Dictionary of Biography. Australian Dictionary of Biography, Vol. 8, 1891–1939. Melbourne: Melbourne University Press. ISBN 0-522-84219-4.
- Bryan, Rorke (2011). Ordeal by Ice: Ships of the Antarctic. Dobbs Ferry, NY: Sheridan House. ISBN 978-1-57409-312-4.
- Fuchs, Vivian; Hillary, Edmund (1958). The Crossing of Antarctica. London: Cassel. OCLC 851287306.
- Headland, Robert (1984). "Wilhelm Filchner and Deutschland, 1911 and 1912". The Island of South Georgia. Cambridge: Cambridge University Press. pp. 69–71. ISBN 0-521-25274-1.
- Headland, Robert (1989). Chronological List of Antarctic Expeditions and Related Historical Events. Cambridge: Cambridge University Press. ISBN 978-1-446-42346-2.
- Lüdecke, Cornelia (2007). "German South Polar (Gauss) Expedition 1901–03". In Beau Riffenburgh (ed.). Encyclopedia of the Antarctic. Encyclopedia of the Antarctic, Volume 1. New York and London: Routledge. ISBN 978-0-415-97024-2.
- Lüdecke, Cornelia (2008). Filchner, Wilhelm 1877–1957. Ledbury, Herefordshire: David Tatham. ISBN 978-0-955-89850-1.
- Mill, Hugh Robert (1905). The Siege of the South Pole. London: Alston Rivers. OCLC 576670819.
- Mills, William James (2003). Exploring Polar Frontiers: A Historical Encyclopedia. Santa Barbara, CA; Denver, CO; Oxford, England: ABC-CLIO. ISBN 1-57607-422-6.
- Morrell, Benjamin (1832). A Narrative of Four Voyages...etc. New York: J. & J. Harper. OCLC 562341783. "Benjamin Morrell."
- Murphy, David Thomas (2002). German Exploration of the Polar World: A History, 1870-1940. Lincoln, NE and London: University of Nebraska Press. ISBN 0-8032-3205-5.
- Rack, Ursula (2018). "Exploring and Mapping the Antarctic: Histories of Discovery and Knowledge". In Mark Nuttall (ed.). The Routledge Handbook of the Polar Regions. London and New York: Routledge. ISBN 978-1-138-84399-8.
- Smith, Michael (2019). Shackleton: By Endurance we Conquer. London: OneWorld Publications. ISBN 978-1-78074-707-1.
- Turney, Chris (2012). 1912: The Year the World Discovered Antarctica. London: The Bodley Head. ISBN 978-1-84792-174-1.

Journals

- "Antarctic Expeditions, Past and Present: Some Heroes of Exploration". Scientific American. 105: 424–425. July 1912. doi:10.1038/scientificamerican11111911-424.
- Cronenwett, Philip N. (1995). "Book Review: To the Sixth Continent: The Second German South Polar Expedition". Arctic and Alpine Research. 27 (4): 415–417. doi:10.1080/00040851.1995.12003140. S2CID 251152682.
- Filchner, Wilhelm; Przybyllok, Erich (1913). "The German Antarctic Expedition". Bulletin of the American Geographical Society. 45 (6): 423–430. doi:10.2307/200593. JSTOR 200593. S2CID 4033913.
- Hornik, Helmut; Lüdecke, Cornelia (2–3 June 2005). Wilhelm Filchner and Antarctica. 1st SCAR Workshop on the History of Antarctic Research. Bavarian Academy of Sciences and Humanities. pp. 55–61. Archived from the original on 1 November 2020.
- Rack, Ursula (2014). "As if the Weddell Sea were not Big Enough" (PDF). Antarctic. 32, no. 3 (229). New Zealand Antarctic Society: 33–34.
- Stone, Ian R. (1995). "Review: To the Sixth Continent: The Second German South Polar Expedition". Polar Record. 31 (178): 348–349. doi:10.1017/S0032247400013929.

Websites

- "Antarctic Explorers: Wilhelm Filchner 1877–1957". South-Pole.com.
- "Five Ways to Compute the Relative Value of a UK Pound Amount, 1270 to Present". MeasuringWorth.
- "Press Release: 100th anniversary of start of Filchner expedition to the Antarctic – Significant discoveries in favourite area for modern German polar research". Alfred Wegener Institute. May 2011.
- Rafferty, John P. (12 January 2007). "Ronne Ice Shelf". Encyclopædia Britannica online edition.
- Savours, Ann (January 2011). "Shackleton, Sir Ernest Henry (1874–1922)". Oxford Dictionary of National Biography (online ed.). Oxford: Oxford University Press. doi:10.1093/ref:odnb/36034. (Subscription, Wikipedia Library access or UK public library membership required.)
- "Spotlight on Antarctic Expeditions: The German International Polar Year Expedition 1882-83". Scott Polar Research Institute, University of Cambridge.
