= Bill of health =

A bill of health is a document from officials of a port of departure indicating to the officials of the port of arrival whether it is likely that a ship is carrying a contagious disease, either literally on board as fomites or via its crewmen or passengers.

As defined in a consul's handbook from 1879:

A bill of health is a document issued by the consul or the public authorities of the port which a ship sails from, descriptive of the health of the port at the time of the vessel's clearance. A clean bill of health certifies that at the date of its issue no infectious disease was known to exist either in the port or its neighbourhood. A suspected or touched bill of health reports that rumours were in circulation that an infectious disease had appeared but that the rumour had not been confirmed by any known cases. A foul bill of health or the absence of a clean bill of health implies that the place the vessel cleared from was infected with a contagious disease. The two latter cases would render the vessel liable to quarantine.

== See also ==
- Quarantine
