= Cape Vahsel =

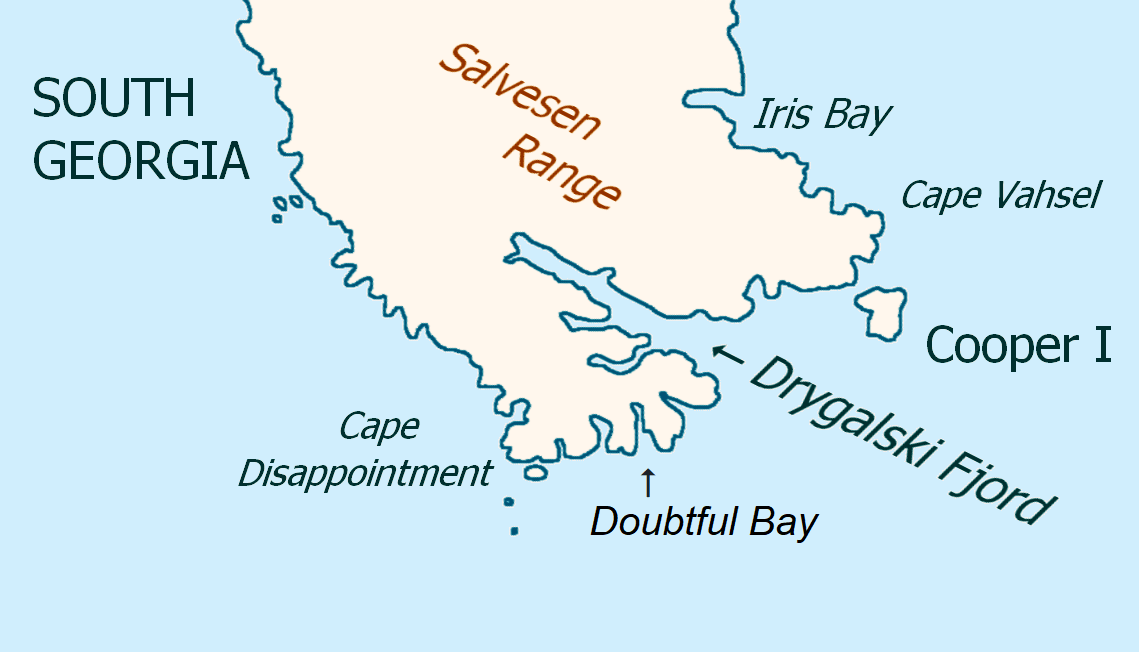
Southeast extremity of South Georgia with Cape Vahsel

Cape Vahsel (54°45′S 35°48′W) is a headland forming the eastern tip of South Georgia. It was roughly charted by Captain James Cook in 1775, remapped by the Second German Antarctic Expedition under Wilhelm Filchner, 1911–12, and named for Captain Richard Vahsel, master of the expedition ship Deutschland.
