= Richard Vahsel =

German naval officer

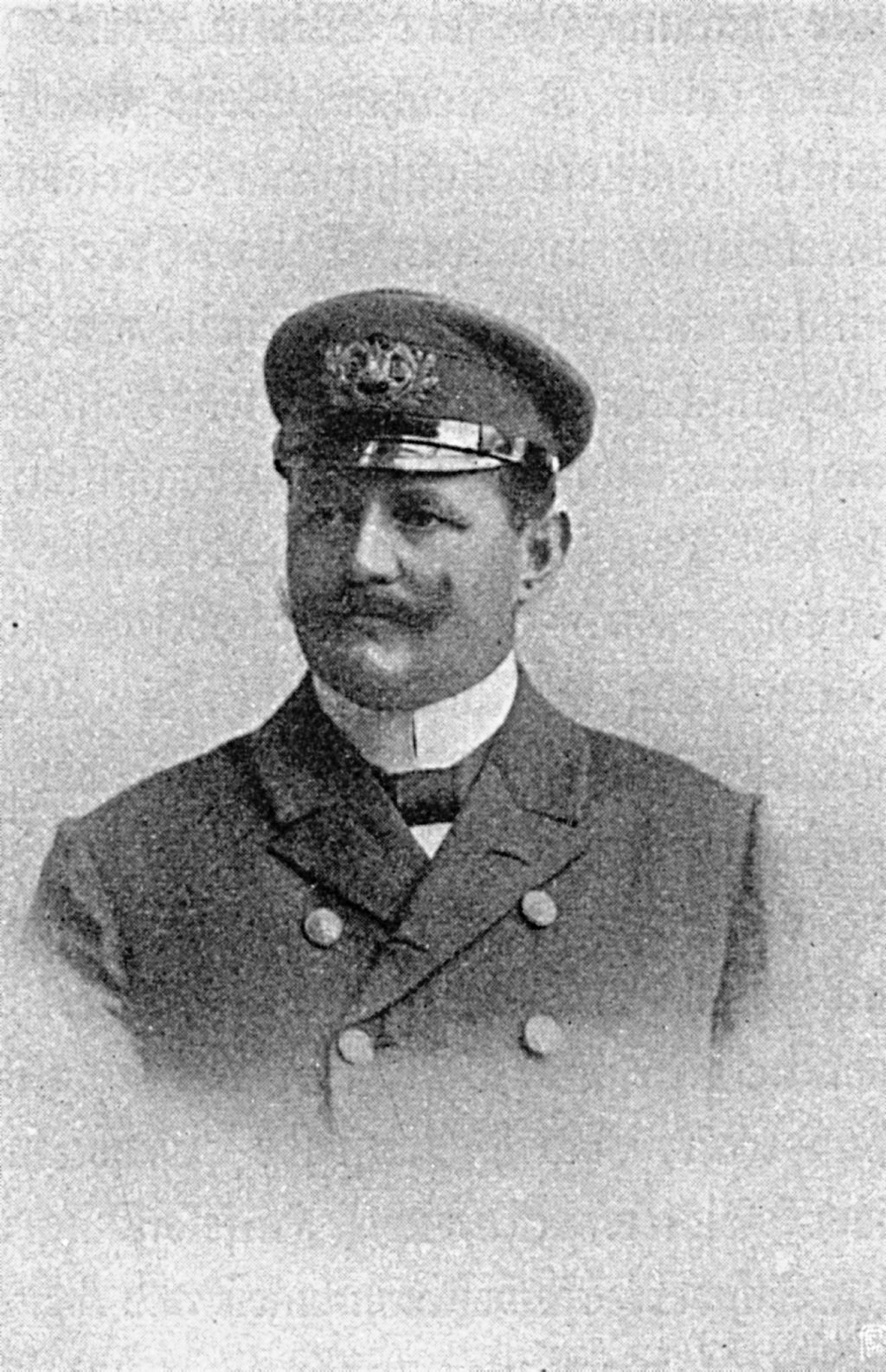
Richard Vahsel

Richard Vahsel (9 February 1868 – 8 August 1912) was a German naval officer who served as second officer on the Antarctic Gauss expedition, under command of Erich von Drygalski. In 1911, Vahsel was controversially appointed as captain of the Deutschland, on Wilhelm Filchner's Second German Antarctic Expedition, 1911–1913. Vahsel and Filchner proved incompatible, and the failure of their relationship fatally undermined the chances of the expedition's success.

Vahsel died during the expedition, of heart failure likely aggravated by the effects of syphilis, as Deutschland was drifting while trapped in the ice in the Weddell Sea. He was buried in the ice on 10 August 1912, as the ship drifted across the Antarctic Circle. Vahsel Bay, at the southern extreme of the Weddell Sea, is named after him, as are the Vahsel Glacier on Heard Island, discovered during Drygalski's expedition, and Cape Vahsel on the south-eastern coast of South Georgia.
