= New Zealand Antarctic Society =

New Zealand society for people interested in the Antarctic region

New Zealand Antarctic Society (Inc.)
- Founders: Arthur Leigh Hunt; Rear Admiral Byrd; Douglas Mawson
- Established: 1934
- Mission: Antarctica
- Head: former patron Sir Edmund Hillary
- Website: antarcticsociety.org.nz

New Zealand Antarctic Society was formed in 1933 by New Zealand businessman Arthur Leigh Hunt and Antarctic explorers Rear Admiral Richard E. Byrd and Sir Douglas Mawson.

Its aims are:

- to bring together people interested in the region
- to share knowledge of the region
- to foster interest in the region
- to seek and support protection of the Antarctic environment
- to promote New Zealand's interests in the region

Since 1956 it has published a quarterly magazine, Antarctic.

A set of Ross Dependency postage stamps celebrated the society's 50th anniversary in 1983.

The national office is now in Auckland.

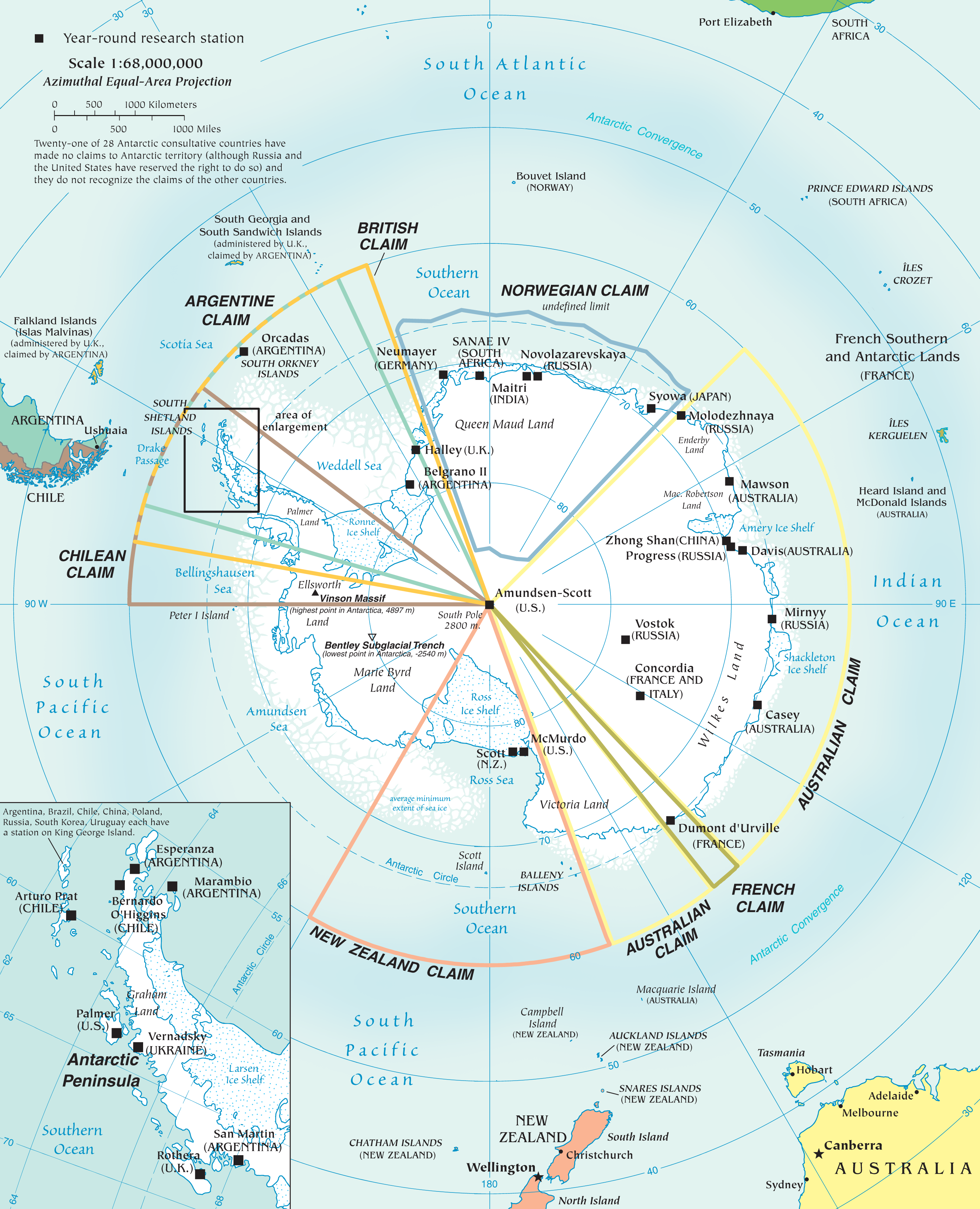
Claims to the territory
