= Sesostris (disambiguation) =

Sesostris may refer to:

- Sesostris, a king of Egypt described by Herodotus
- Senusret, three kings of the 12th Dynasty also called Sesostris
- Sesostris (play), a 1728 play by John Sturmy
- Sesostris Bank, a submerged bank named after the 1839 steam frigate INS Sesostris of the Indian Navy.
- Sesostris Reef, a previous name for Margaret Brock Reef, a reef in South Australia
- Sesostris rock – a submerged rock that in the 19th Century lay near what was then the entrance to the Yong River (Guangxi)
- Sesostris (ship) – one of several ships
- Ampeloglypter sesostris, a species of weevil
- Parides sesostris, a species of butterfly
