= Angria Bank =

Submerged atoll in Maharashtra, India

Coordinates: 16°43′N 72°03′E

- Submerged bank Angria Bank (India)
- Interactive map of Angria Bank
- Country: India
- State: Maharashtra

Languages
  - Official: Marathi
- Time zone: UTC+5:30 (IST)

Angria Bank is a bank, a shallow sunken atoll, on the continental shelf off the west coast of India. It is located 105 kilometres (65 mi) west of Vijaydurg, Maharashtra. It has platform type coral reef.

The name Angria Bank is derived from the name of one of the most successful Naval Admiral of Maratha Empire, Kanhoji Angre, whose name was spelled Conajee Angria by the British.

== Geography ==
The bank is at an average depth of approximately 35 metres (115 ft), and its dimensions are 40 kilometres (25 mi) from north to south and 15 kilometres (9 mi) from east to west. It is a coral reef. The depth may vary; at some points, the water is 23 metres (75 ft) deep, and at other points, the seafloor can be 400 metres (1,300 ft) below sea level. The bottom is composed of sand, shells, and coral. The bank is steep-to on all sides, with great depths surrounding it.

Angria Bank is 200 kilometres (120 mi) north of Adas Bank, a similar submerged feature off the coast of Goa.

== Marine life ==
21 Nov 1964, as part of Indian oceans Expendition, Department of Fisheries, Maharashtra Surveyed for two week with 7 Department Mechanical vessel and 3 private fishing vessel. Catching 9019 kg fish of different 60 fish species. This Expendition chief scientist was Dr. M R Ranade with 12 other scientist of Department of Fisheries, Maharashtra and two scientist from Bhabha Atomic research station Mumbai In late December 2019, the Wildlife Conservation Society of India launched an expedition to Angria Bank, discovering a coral reef that hadn't bleached yet. The government of India plans to designate Angria Bank as a marine protected reserve.

Angria Bank is known to have at least one laced moray eel, a school of schooling bannerfish, and a red knob sea star. Several common dolphins and Indo-Pacific bottlenose dolphins inhabit the deeper waters of the coast. During the 8-day expedition to Angria Bank that started on 18 December, over 150 species of corals and algae were documented with no visible signs of bleaching.

== Tourism ==
As of 2008, Angria Bank is accessible by a two-hour boat ride from Malvan, Maharashtra. In 2008, Maharashtra state Finance Minister Jayant Patil announced a ₹50 million initiative to explore Angria Bank to determine the feasibility of further marine tourism in the area.

The first ever underwater scientific expedition was carried out by the National Institute of Oceanography in 1985 . It revealed significant biodiversity though the results are yet to be published.

== See also ==
- Coral reefs in India
- List of reefs
