= Cora Divh =

Submerged bank belonging to the Union Territory of Lakshadweep, India

Nickname: Little Bassas de Pedro Bank
- Location within India

Geography
- Location: Arabian Sea
- Coordinates: 13°42′N 72°11′E
- Archipelago: Lakshadweep
- Adjacent to: Indian Ocean
- Total islands: 0
- Area: 339.45 km^{2} (131.06 sq mi)
- Length: 42 km (26.1 mi)
- Width: 12 km (7.5 mi)
- Coastline: 0 km (0 mi)
- Highest elevation: −27.4 m (-89.9 ft)

Administration
- India
- Territory: Union territory of Lakshadweep
- District: Lakshadweep
- Island group: Aminidivi
- Tehsils of India: Aminidivi Tehsil
- Subdivisions of India: Chetlat Island

Demographics
- Population: 0 (2016)
- Pop. density: 0/km^{2} (0/sq mi)
- Ethnic groups: Malayali, Mahls

Additional information
- Time zone: IST (UTC+5:30)
- ISO code: IN-LD-01
- Official website: www.lakshadweep.gov.in
- Avg. summer temperature: 32.0 °C (89.6 °F)
- Avg. winter temperature: 28.0 °C (82.4 °F)
- Topography: submerged bank

Cora Divh, also called Coradeeve or Little Bassas de Pedro Bank (cf. Great Bassas de Pedro), is a submerged bank or sunken atoll belonging to the Amindivi Subgroup of islands of the Union Territory of Lakshadweep, India. It has a distance of 1,733 km (1,077 mi) south of the city of Delhi.

== History ==
An Indian patrol ship is named after this bank.

== Geography ==
Cora Divh as seen from space.

Cora Divh is the third largest feature of Lakshadweep, after Bassas de Pedro and Sesostris Bank, with a lagoon area of 339.45 km^{2} (131.06 sq mi). It is also the northernmost feature, reaching to 13°58'N. Those coral banks, all submerged, form the north of Lakshadweep. Adas Bank, which lies 90 km to the north of Cora Divh, is the same type of formation but is not part of Lakshadweep.

Cora Divh is 42 km long southwest–northeast, and 12 about km wide. Its southwest point is located 34 km north-northeast of Sesostris Bank. There are no emergent cays or islands. Cora Divh has depths of 27.4 to 55 m, and is covered by sand, coral rubble and broken shells. According to other sources, the least depth is 16 meters. Depths in the neighborhood of the bank reach 700 meters.

== Administration ==
The bank belongs to the Ward of Chetlat Island of Aminidivi Tehsil.
