= Sesostris (ship) =

Several ships have been named Sesostris for Sesostris:

- Sesostris (1818 ship) was launched at Hull. She traded with India, the Baltic, and Russia, carried troops for a Chilean military expedition against Peru, and transported convicts to New South Wales. She was broken up in 1843.
- Sesostris (1841 ship), of 581 tons (bm; old Act) and 606 tons (bm; new Act), was launched in Nova Scotia. She was last listed in 1856.
- Sesostris (1916 trawler), of 293 GRT was built at Grimsby. The Admiralty hired her and armed her (1 × 12-pounder gun + 1 × 3.5"BT). She served from May 1916 to 1919, first as a minesweeper and then as a hydrophone vessel.

== See also ==
- INS Sesostris was a 4-gun steam frigate launched on 10 September 1839 by Pitcher, Northfleet, for the Indian Navy under the Bombay Government. She participated in expeditions to Aden and the Gulf, the First Opium War, and the Second Anglo-Burmese War. In 1853 she was transferred to the Bengal Government. She gave her name to the Sesostris Bank and the Sesostris Rock. Although she is sometimes referred to as HMS Sesostris, she never served the Royal Navy.
- French paddle aviso Sesostris was launched in 1835 at Cherbourg Dockyard as one of 10 vessels for the packet service between France and the Levant. In 1853 the Ministry of Finance purchased her and she saw service with the French Navy, participating in the Battle of Kinburn (1855). She was struck in 1861 and eventually broken up in 1896.
