= Bassas de Pedro =

Submerged bank of the Union Territory of Lakshadweep, India

Native name: മഞ്ഞപ്പാർ Nickname: Pedro Bank
- Location within India
- Etymology: The Local fishermen called after the Sea Over the bank seen as yellow water from a far view ..

Geography
- Location: Arabian Sea
- Coordinates: 13°05′N 72°25′E
- Type: Submerged bank
- Archipelago: Lakshadweep
- Adjacent to: Indian Ocean
- Total islands: 0
- Area: 2,474.33 km^{2} (955.34 sq mi)
- Length: 130 km (81 mi)
- Width: 13 - 33 km (-12 mi)
- Highest elevation: −16.4 m (-53.8 ft)

Administration
- India
- Territory: Union territory of Lakshadweep
- District: Lakshadweep
- Island group: Aminidivi
- Tehsils of India: Aminidivi
- Subdivisions of India: Chetlat Island

Demographics
- Population: 0 (2014)
- Pop. density: 0/km^{2} (0/sq mi)
- Ethnic groups: Malayali, Mahls

Additional information
- Time zone: IST (UTC+5:30)
- ISO code: IN-LD-02
- Official website: www.lakshadweep.gov.in
- Avg. summer temperature: 32.0 °C (89.6 °F)
- Avg. winter temperature: 28.0 °C (82.4 °F)

Bassas de Pedro, also known as Manjappar or Pedro Bank, is a submerged bank or sunken atoll belonging to the Amindivi subgroup of islands of the Union Territory of Lakshadweep, India. It lies 1,795 km (1,115 mi) south of the city of Delhi.

== Geography ==
It is the largest feature of Lakshadweep, with a lagoon area of 2,474.33 km^{2} (955.34 sq mi), which is more than half of the sum of all lagoon sizes in Lakshadweep (59 percent). It is also one of the northernmost features, second only to Cora Divh. Bassas de Pedro, Cora Divh and Sesostris Bank, all submerged, form the north of Lakshadweep. Bassas de Pedro stretches over 130 km from 12°31'N to 13°41'N, in the shape of an arch open to the east. Its width ranges from 15 km in the north to 33 km in the south. Its southern end is 63 km east of North Cay of Cherbaniani Reef, the closest land feature.

There are no emergent cays or islands. The general depth ranges from 46 to 50 meters, with extremes between 16.4 and 73 meters. The bank is steep-to, smooth with minor undulations in topography, and composed of sand, shells, and decayed coral. The water on the bank is not discolored.

== Administration ==
The bank belongs to the township of Chetlat Island of Aminidivi Tehsil.
