= Coral reefs in India =

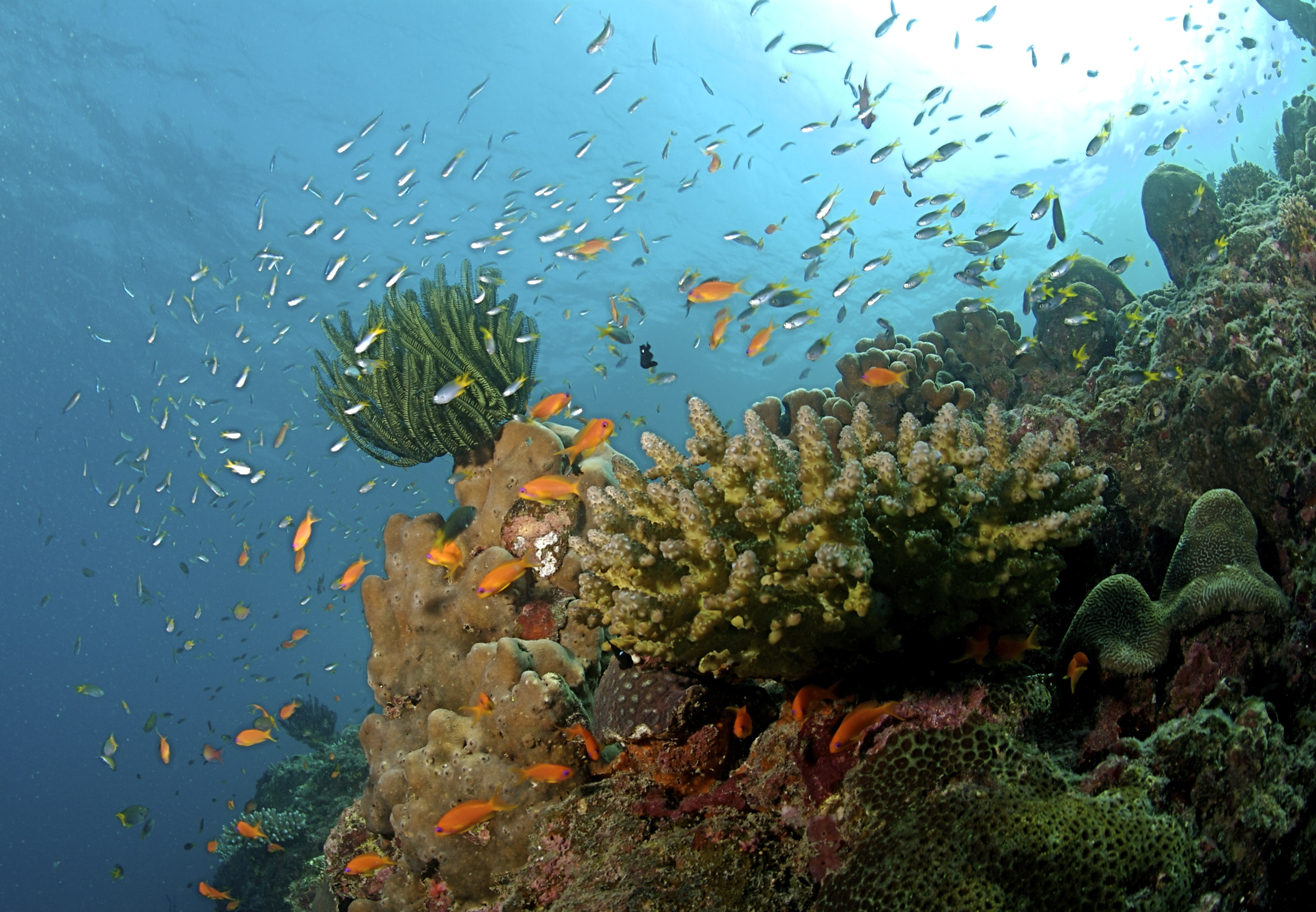
Coral reef at the Andaman Islands

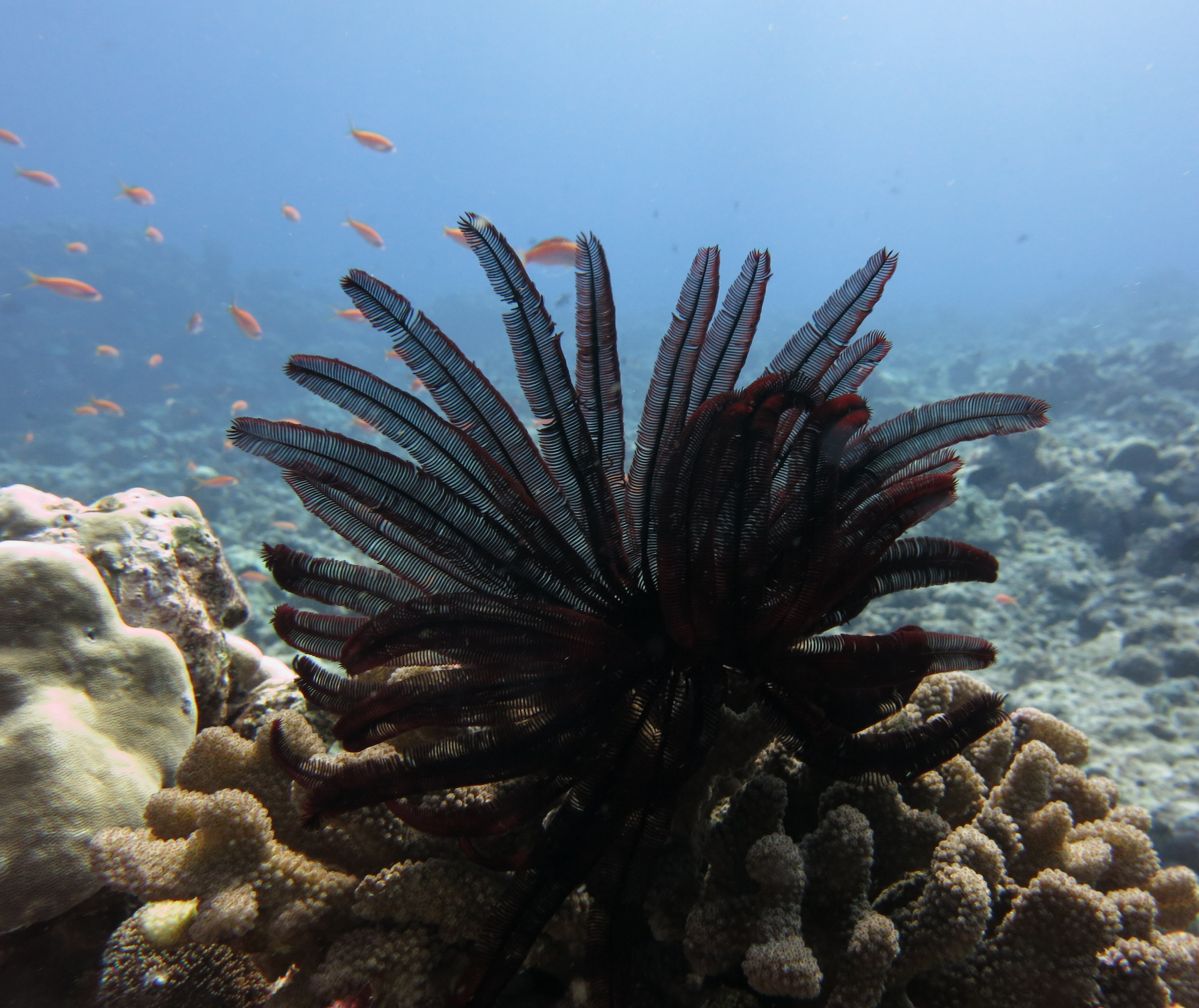
Feather star coral reef in Lakshadweep atolls

Coral reefs in India are one of the most ancient and dynamic ecosystems of India. The coral reefs not only provide a sanctuary to myriad marine species but also play a key role in protecting the coastline from erosion. India has about 7517 km of coastline including islands but mainland coast is 6100 km.

The Coral reefs in India are mainly restricted to the Andaman and Nicobar Islands, Gulf of Mannar, Gulf of Kutch, Palk Strait and the Lakshadweep islands. All of these reefs are Fringing reefs, except Lakshadweep which are Atolls. There are Patchy corals present along the inter-tidal areas of the central west coast like the intertidal regions of Ratnagiri, Gaveshani Bank etc. The Hermatypic corals are also present along the sea shore from Kollam in Kerala to Enayam Puthenthurai in Tamil Nadu.

== Research and Institutions ==
The Major Institutions in India involved in the management, monitoring and research on Coral reefs are the Ministry of Earth Sciences, the Zoological Survey of India, Central Marine Fisheries Research Institute, Madurai Kamaraj University, Annamalai University, National Centre for Earth Science Studies, National Institute of Ocean Technology, National Institute of Oceanography, India etc.

The Space Applications Centre in Ahmedabad is involved in the data collection of areas under Coral reefs using remote sensing.

== Laws and regulations ==
The Ministry of Environment, Forest and Climate Change manages and guidelines for the protection of the Coral reefs in India. If the Coral reef region is under a protected area then it comes under the jurisdiction of the State Wild life department.

The Coastal Regulation Zone (CRZ) notification of 1991 gives protection to all marine resources. All types of coral reefs are protected under the CRZ1 category. Its Section 7 (2) prohibits the construction of beach resorts or hotels on coral reefs. In Certain States, the quarrying and collecting of massive corals are banned except for scientific purposes.

== List of Coral reefs ==
- Andaman and Nicobar Islands

Situated in the Bay of Bengal, exclusively fringing reefs of about 572 islands, most of these islands have a healthy biodiversity.

- Eastern Coast

There is a coral reef near the sea between Chandrabhaga coast and Ramachandi in the Konark area of Odisha.

- Gulf of Mannar

Fringing reefs with a chain of 21 islands from Rameswaram in the north to Thoothukudi (Tuticorin) in the south. This part of the gulf forms part of the Gulf of Mannar biosphere reserve.

- Gulf of Kutch

Exclusively consists of fringing reefs. The reefs are relatively less developed due to large range of temperature and high salinity. The harbours have less biodiversity. The entire Gulf of Kutch is also known as a Marine National Park.

- Lakshadweep

Exclusively coral atolls with 36 islands, of which 10 are inhabited. The islands range from less than 1 km (0.62 mi) to about 9 km (5.6 mi) in length, and do not exceed 2 km (1.2 mi) in width.

- Western Coast

There are some coral reefs around small inlets in the western part of the Gulf of Khambat. Angria Bank is a coral reef off Vijaydurg in Maharashtra. Tarkarli in Malwan, Maharashtra is a smaller reef. There is a coral reef in Netrani Island in Karnataka.

== Gallery ==
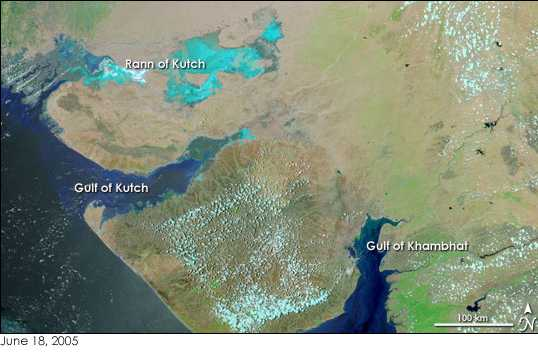
Gulf of Kutch on the left; image by NASA Earth Observatory

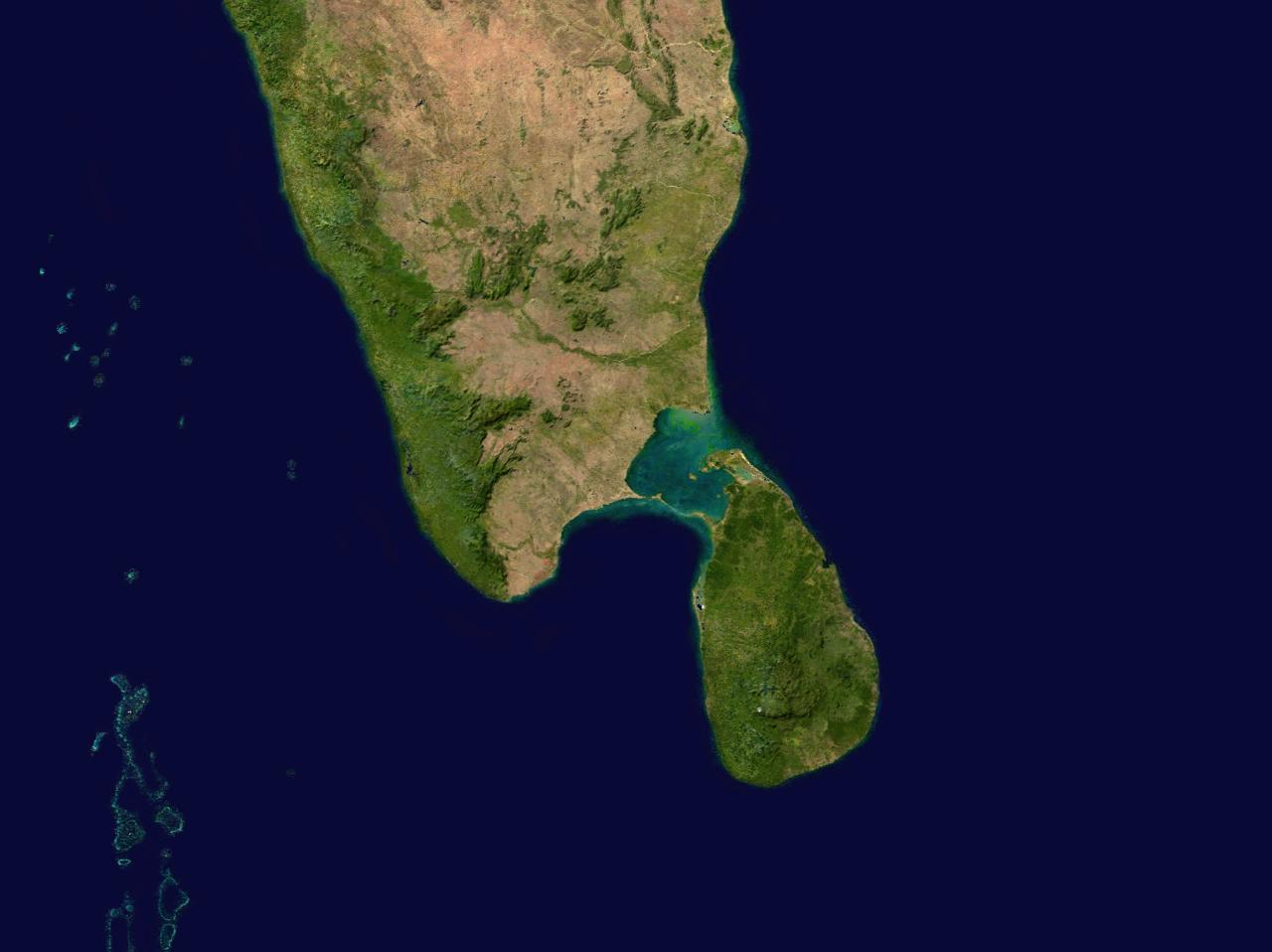
Gulf of Mannar

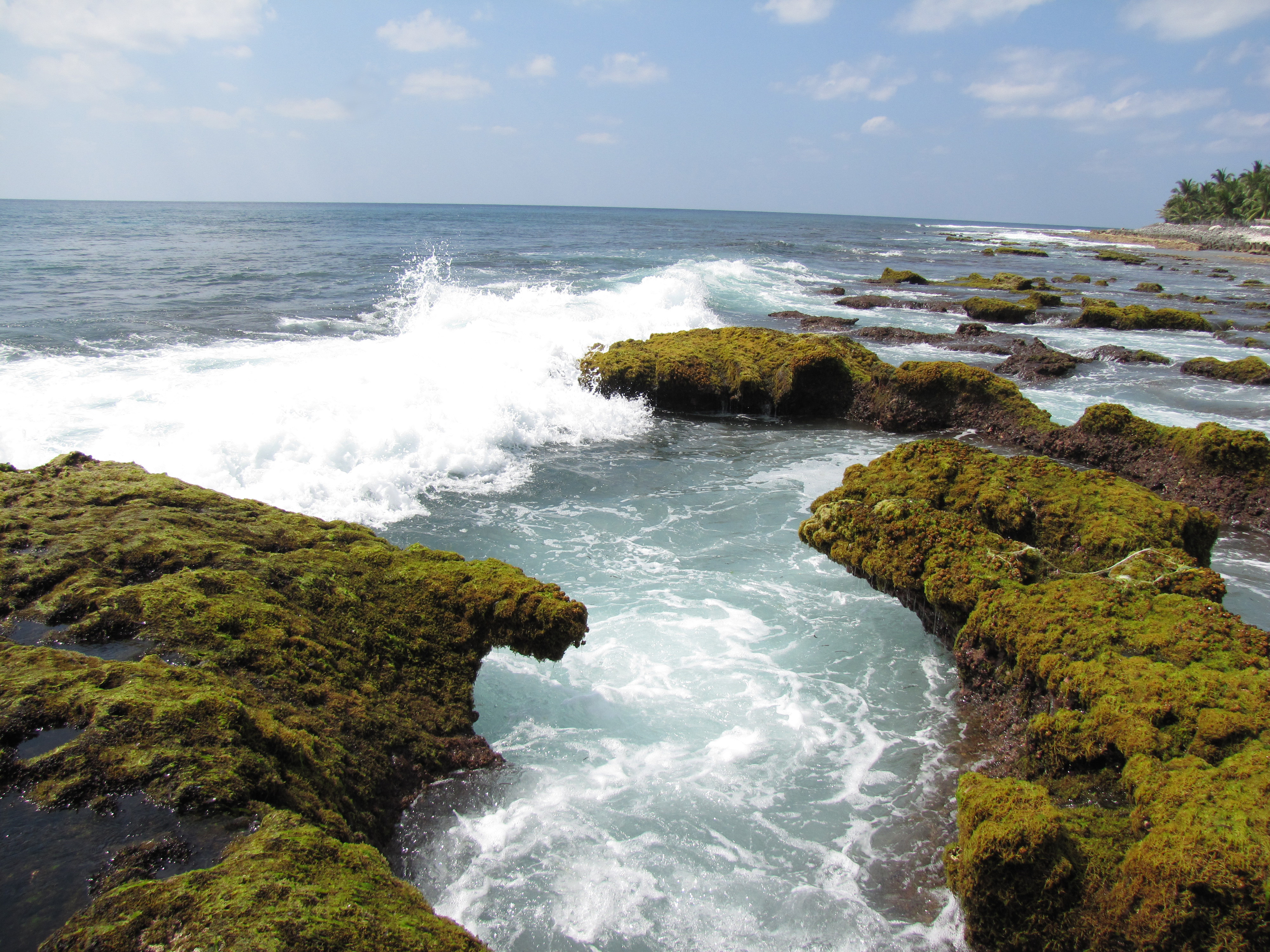
Scene at Lakshadweep Island

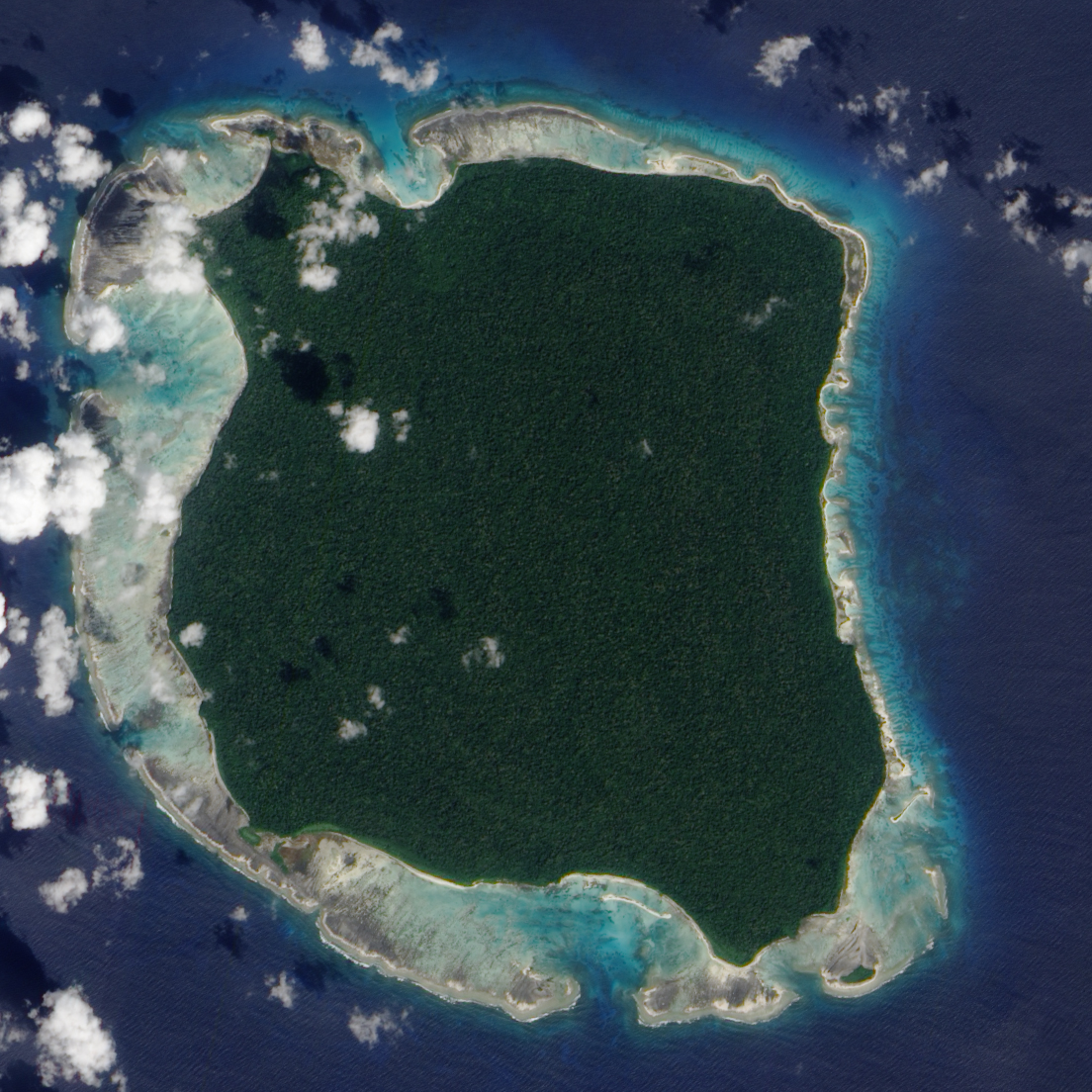
North Sentinel Island is an island in the group of Andaman and Nicobar Islands.

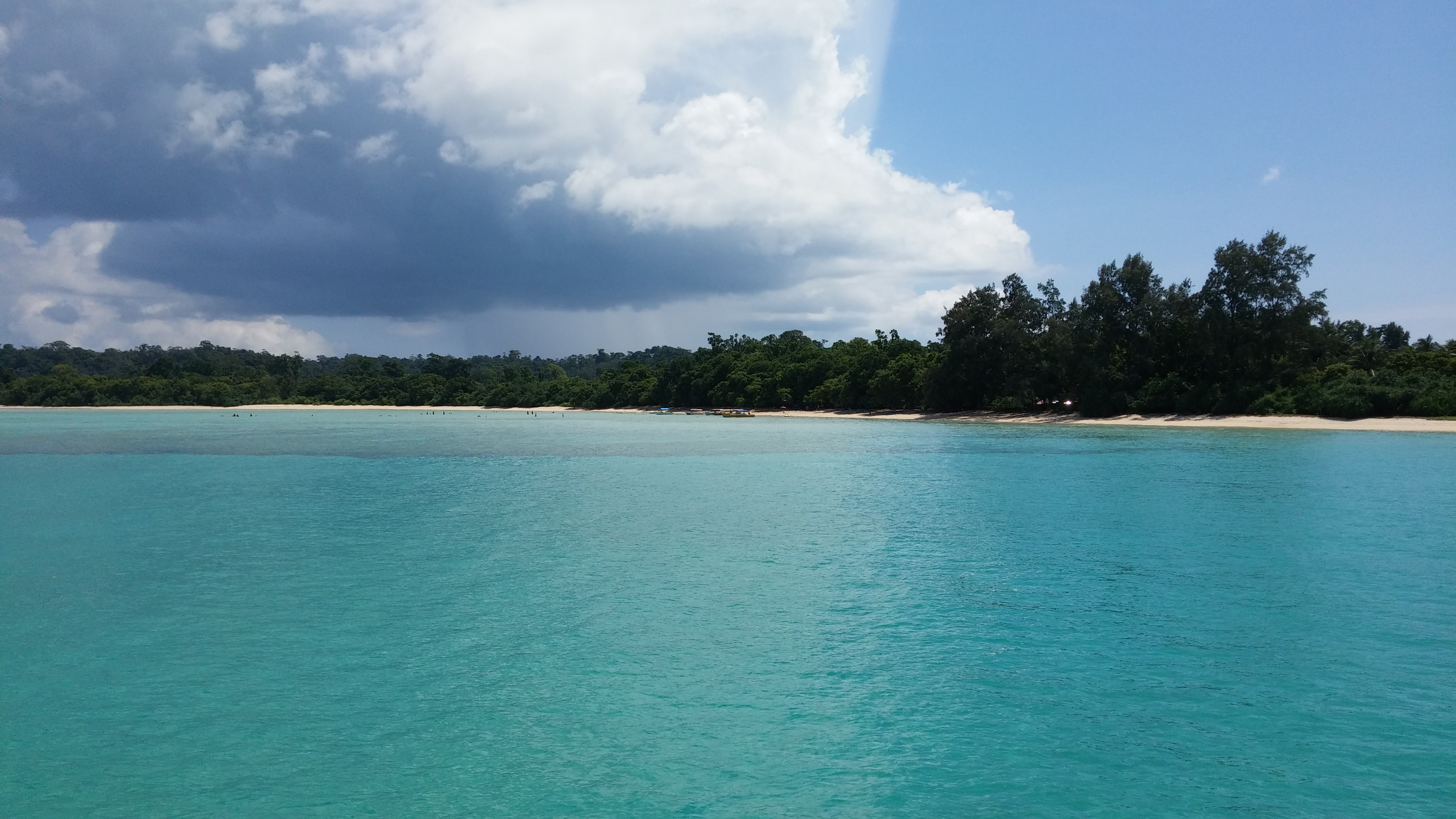
Bharatpur beach in Andaman and Nicobar, as seen from jetty

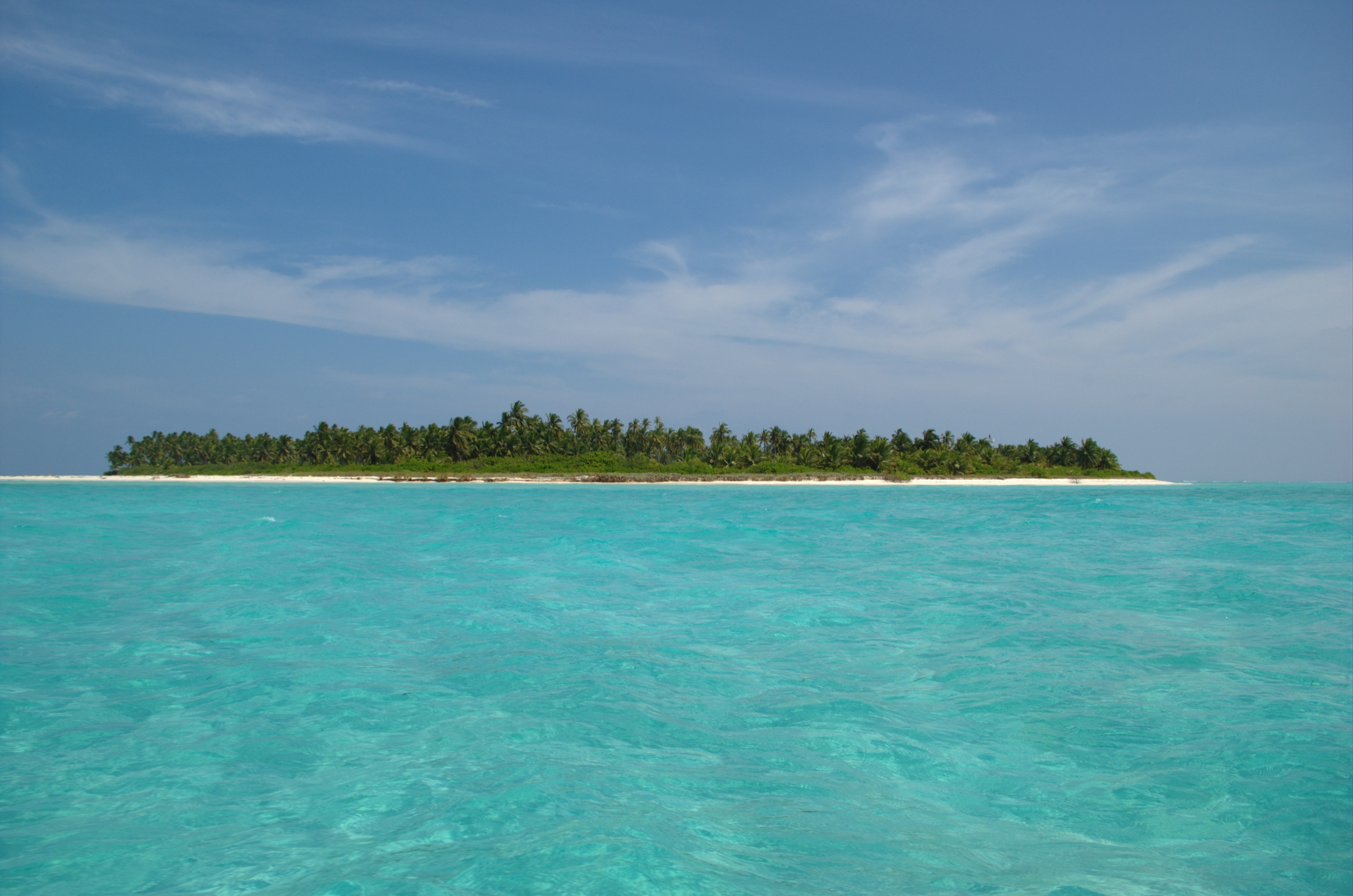
One of the uninhabited islands in Bangaram Atoll, Lakshadweep.

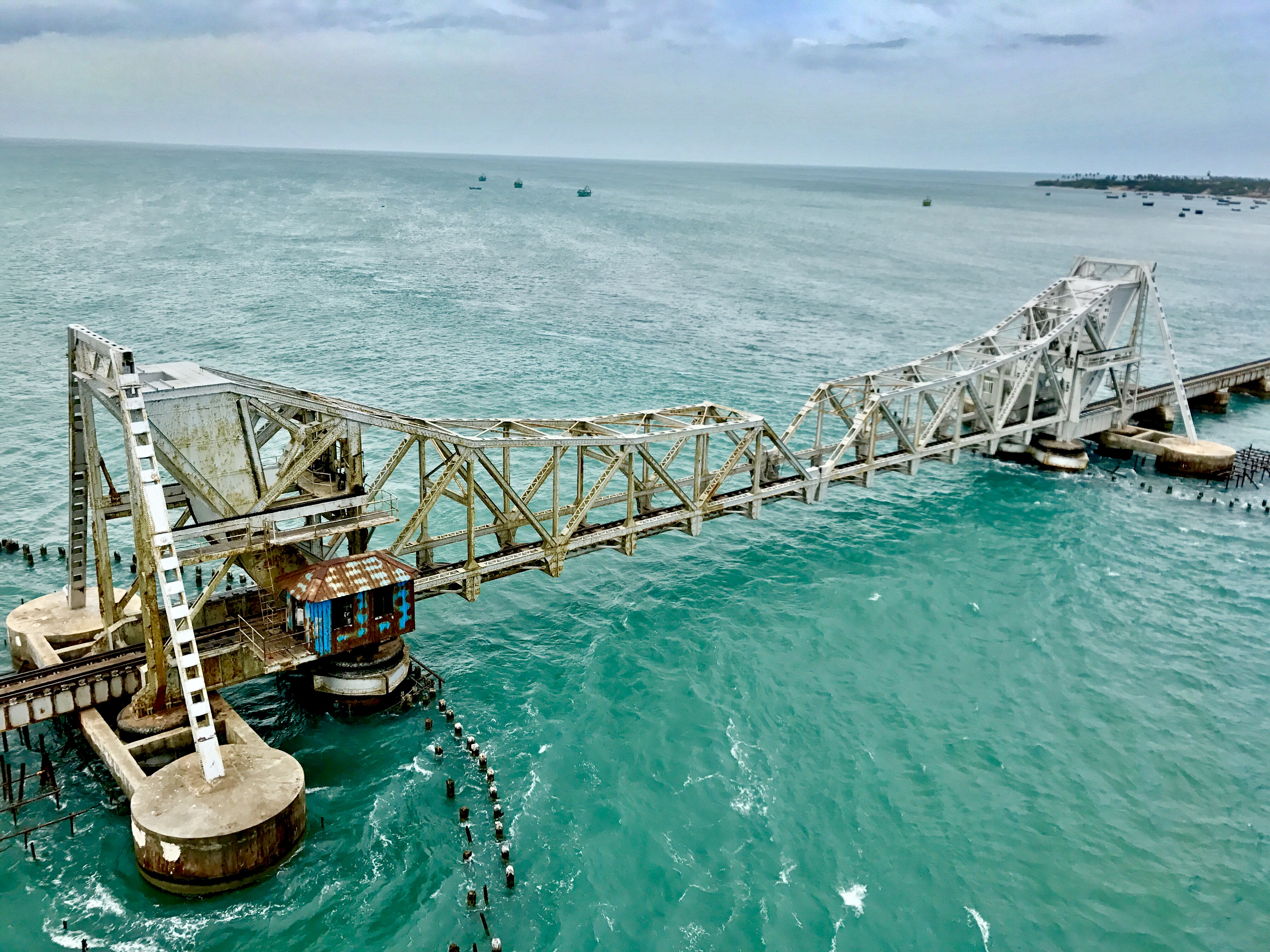
Pamban bridge in Rameshwaram

== See also ==
- Tourism in India
  - Coastal India
  - Fishing in India
  - List of islands in India
  - List of beaches in India
- Geography around Lakshadweep
  - Central Indian Ridge
  - Southeast Indian Ridge
  - Southwest Indian Ridge
  - Rodrigues triple junction
  - Shiva crater
