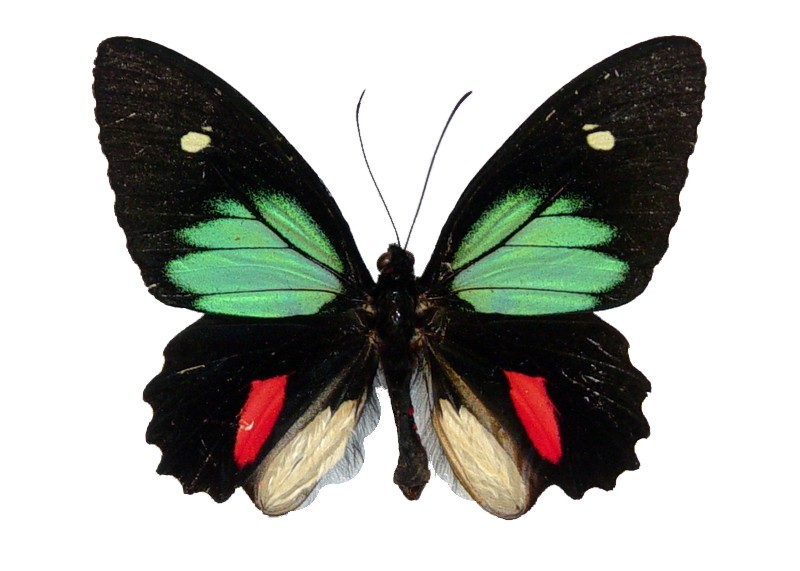
- Male

Scientific classification
- Kingdom: Animalia
- Phylum: Arthropoda
- Class: Insecta
- Order: Lepidoptera
- Family: Papilionidae
- Genus: Parides
- Species: P. childrenae

Binomial name
- Parides childrenae Gray, 1832

= Parides childrenae =

Green-celled cattleheart

Species of butterfly

Parides childrenae, the green-celled cattleheart, is a species of butterfly in the family Papilionidae. It is found in southern North America and northern South America.

== Description ==
The upperside of the wings is black. The male has a bright green patch and a small pale yellow subapical spot on the forewing. There is a red patch on the hindwing. The female has a small white patch on the trailing edge of the forewing and a few pale subapical spots. There is a band of red spots across the hindwing. The underside of the wings is also black. The male has small pale subapical spots on the forewing and a few red spots on the hindwing. The female's underside is the same as the upper side.

== Description from Seitz ==
P. childrenae. The green area of the male is larger than in P. sesostris, covering also a part of the cell. The female has a transverse row of spots before the apex of the forewing, as well as two spots on the disc posteriorly. Distributed from Guatemala to Ecuador in two subspecies. — childrenae ' Gray (3 a) is the Central American form, which is found from Guatemala to Panama. Forewing of the male with a white spot before the apex. Band on the hindwing of the female bright red. — oedippus Luc. has in the male no white spot before the apex of the forewing, or only a very small one. In the female the band on the hindwing is a somewhat yellowish red on the inner side. Colombia and Ecuador.

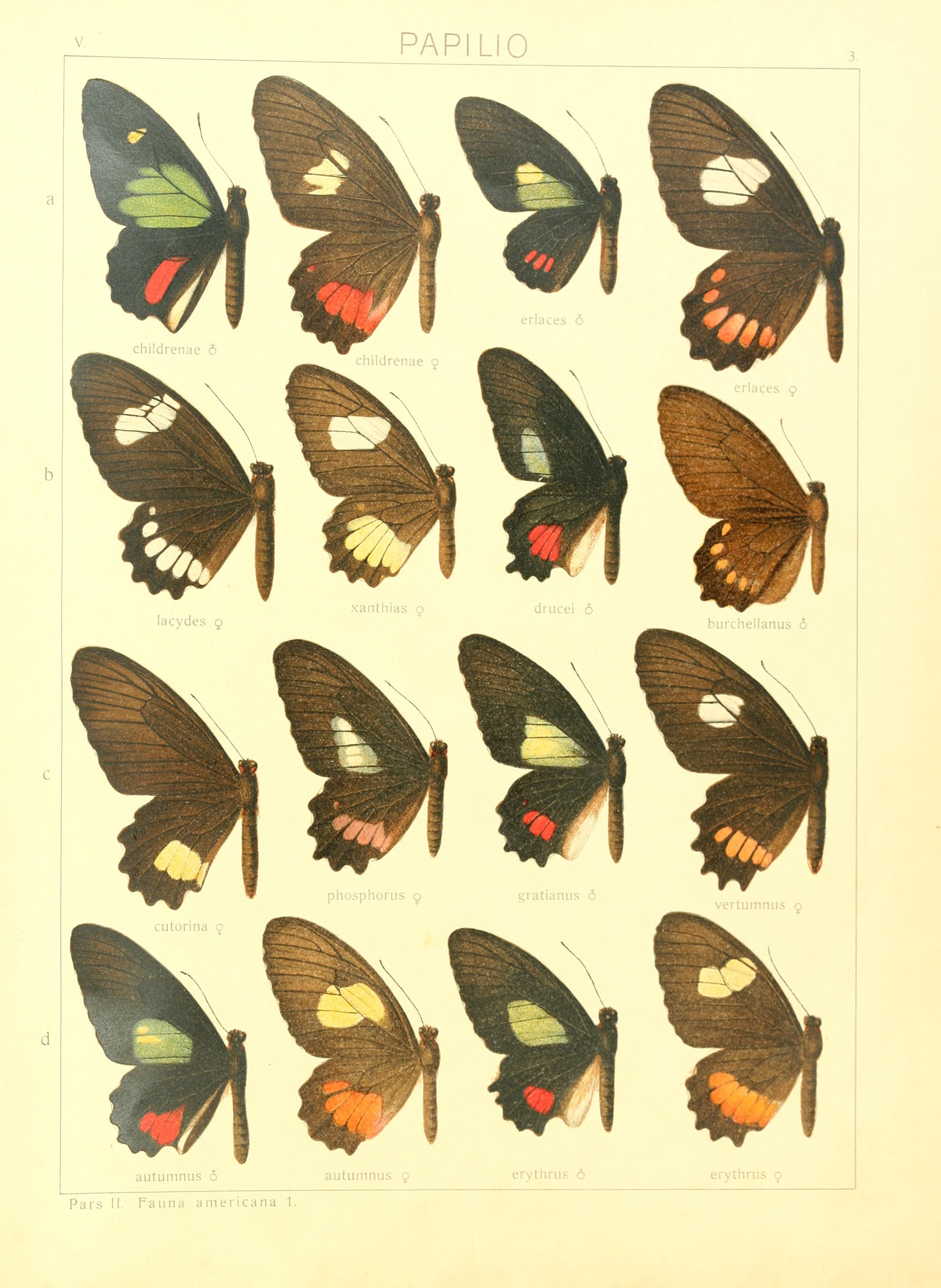
Seitz

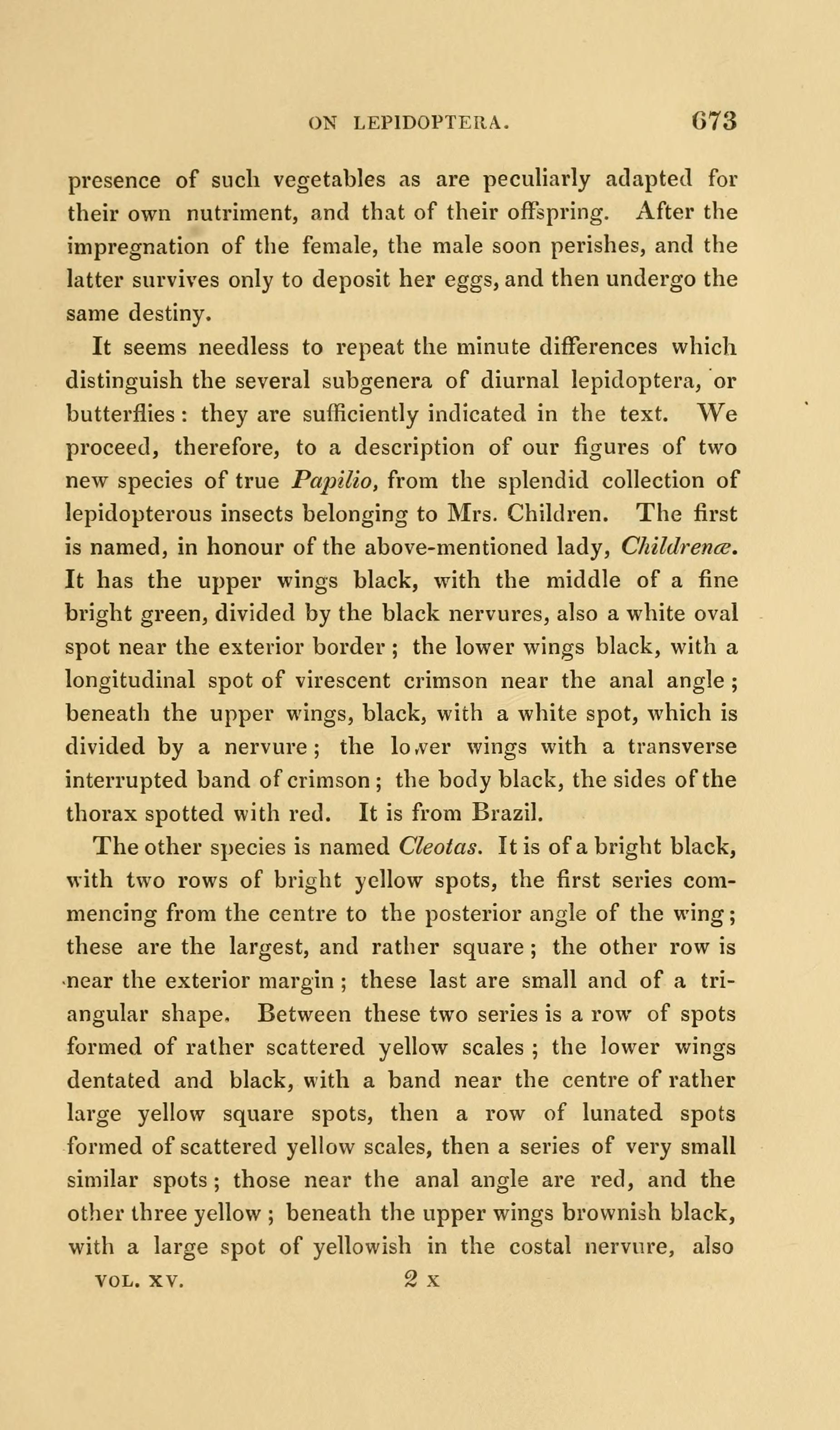
Original description

== Description from Rothschild and Jordan(1906) ==
A full description is provided by Rothschild, W. and Jordan, K. (1906)

== Taxonomy ==
Parides childrenae is a member of the sesostris species group

The members are

- Parides childrenae
- Parides sesostris

== Etymology ==
The name honours Mrs Children
