= Sesostris Bank =

Submerged bank of the Union Territory of Lakshadweep, India

- Location within India

Geography
- Location: Arabian Sea
- Coordinates: 13°08′N 72°00′E
- Archipelago: Lakshadweep
- Adjacent to: Indian Ocean
- Total islands: 0
- Area: 388.53 km^{2} (150.01 sq mi)
- Highest elevation: −20 m (-70 ft)

Administration
- India
- Territory: Union territory of Lakshadweep
- District: Lakshadweep
- Island group: Aminidivi
- Tehsils of India: Aminidivi
- Subdivisions of India: Chetlat Island

Demographics
- Population: 0 (2014)
- Pop. density: 0/km^{2} (0/sq mi)
- Ethnic groups: Malayali, Mahls

Additional information
- Time zone: IST (UTC+5:30)
- ISO code: IN-LD-02
- Official website: www.lakshadweep.gov.in
- Avg. summer temperature: 32.0 °C (89.6 °F)
- Avg. winter temperature: 28.0 °C (82.4 °F)
- Topography: submerged bank

Sesostris Bank is a submerged bank or sunken atoll belonging to the Amindivi Subgroup of islands of the Union Territory of Lakshadweep, India, and has a distance of 1,800 km (1,100 mi) south of the city of Delhi.

== Geography ==
It is the second largest feature of Lakshadweep, after Bassas de Pedro, with a lagoon area of 388.53 km^{2} (150.01 sq mi). It is also one of the northernmost features, after Cora Divh and Bassas de Pedro. Those coral banks, all submerged, form the north of Lakshadweep. Sesostris Bank is about 22 km in diameter. There are no emergent cays or islands. Depths range from 20 to 77 meters. Depths near the bank reach 700 meters.

This bank was named after the steam frigate INS Sesostris of the Indian Navy.

== Administration ==
The bank belongs to the township of Chetlat Island of Aminidivi Tehsil.
