= Adas Bank =

Coordinates: 14°40′N 72°16′E

- Submerged bank Adas Bank (India)
- Interactive map of Adas Bank
- Country: India
- State: Goa

Languages
  - Official: Konkani
- Time zone: UTC+5:30 (IST)

Adas Bank is a submerged bank located off the west coast of India, between Angria Bank (200 km to the north) and Cora Divh bank of the Laccadive Islands (90 km to the south).

== Geography ==
The nearest coast is the Indian mainland close to Goa, which is 180 km east-northeast of Adas Bank. It is not considered part of the Laccadive Islands anymore, but nevertheless one of the northernmost features of the Chagos-Laccadive Ridge. The minimum depth of the bank is 70 meters.
