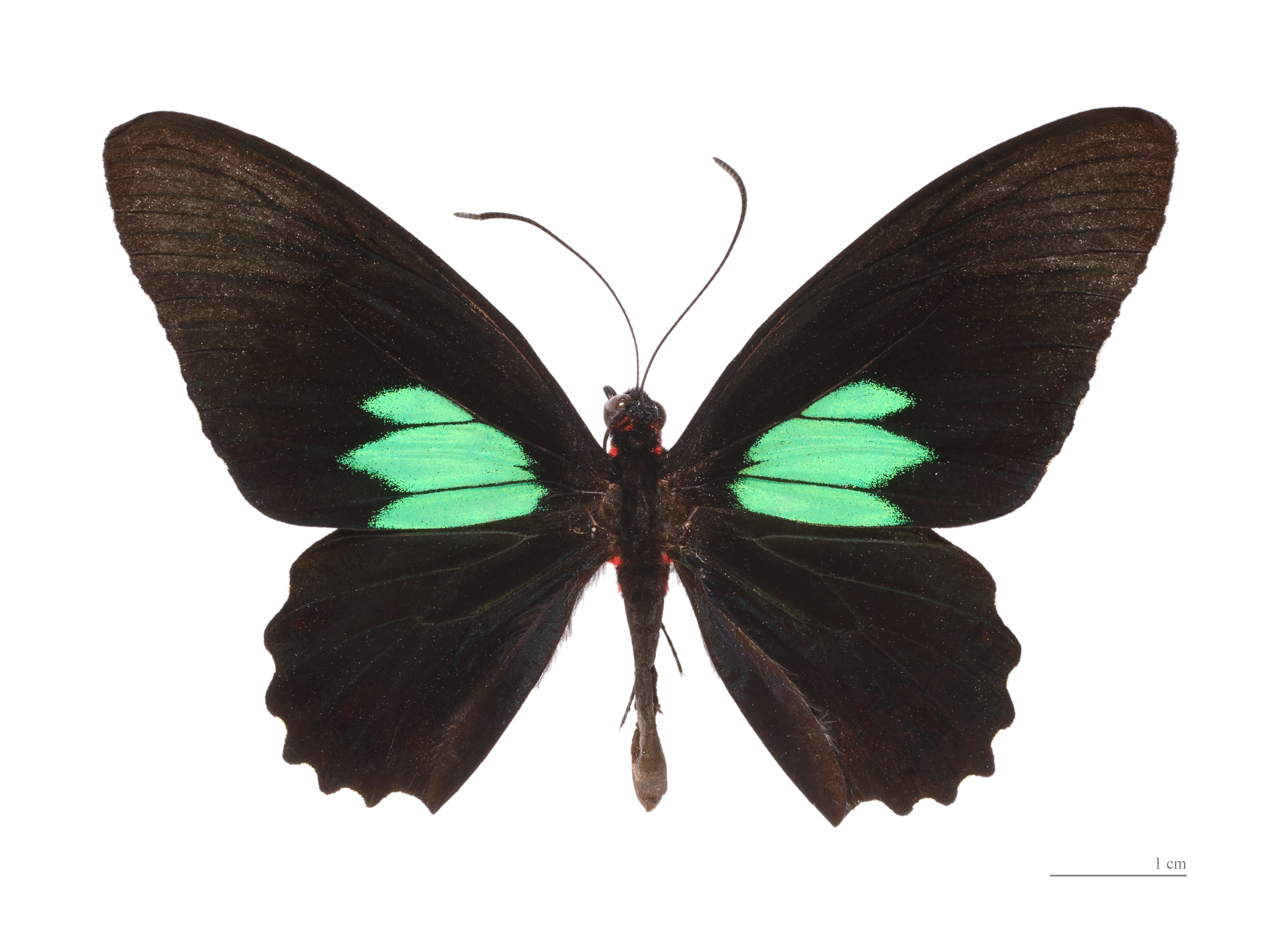

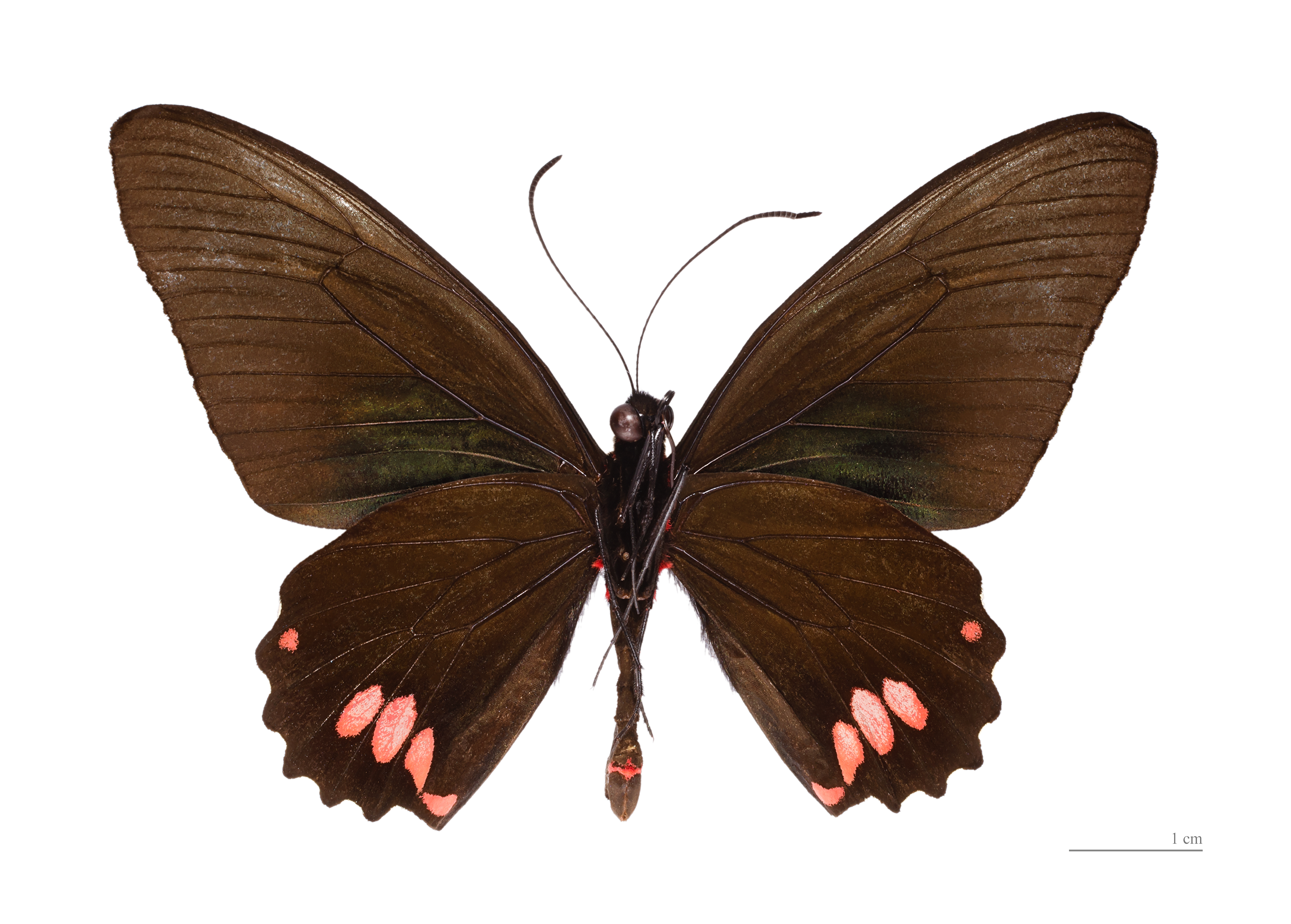
- Underside

Scientific classification
- Kingdom: Animalia
- Phylum: Arthropoda
- Clade: Pancrustacea
- Class: Insecta
- Order: Lepidoptera
- Family: Papilionidae
- Genus: Parides
- Species: P. sesostris

Binomial name
- Parides sesostris (Cramer, 1779)

Synonyms
- Papilio sesostris Cramer, 1779; Papilio tullus Cramer, 1780; Papilio lycomes Gray [1853]; Papilio sesostrellana Kotzsch, 1934; Papilio sesostris ab. pseudozestos (R. Krüger, 1934)

= Parides sesostris =

Emerald-patched cattleheart

Species of butterfly

Parides sesostris, the emerald-patched cattleheart or southern cattleheart, is a species of butterfly in the family Papilionidae.

== Subspecies ==
- Parides sesostris sesostris (Cramer, 1779) (Suriname to eastern Ecuador and south to northern Peru and Brazil)
- Parides sesostris tarquinius (Boisduval, 1836) (Panama to western Ecuador and western Venezuela)
- Parides sesostris trinitensis K. S. Brown, 1994 (Trinidad)
- Parides sesostris zestos (Gray [1853]) (southeastern Mexico to Costa Rica, excluding El Salvador)
- Parides sesostris zischkai (Forster, 1955) (Bolivia)

== Description ==
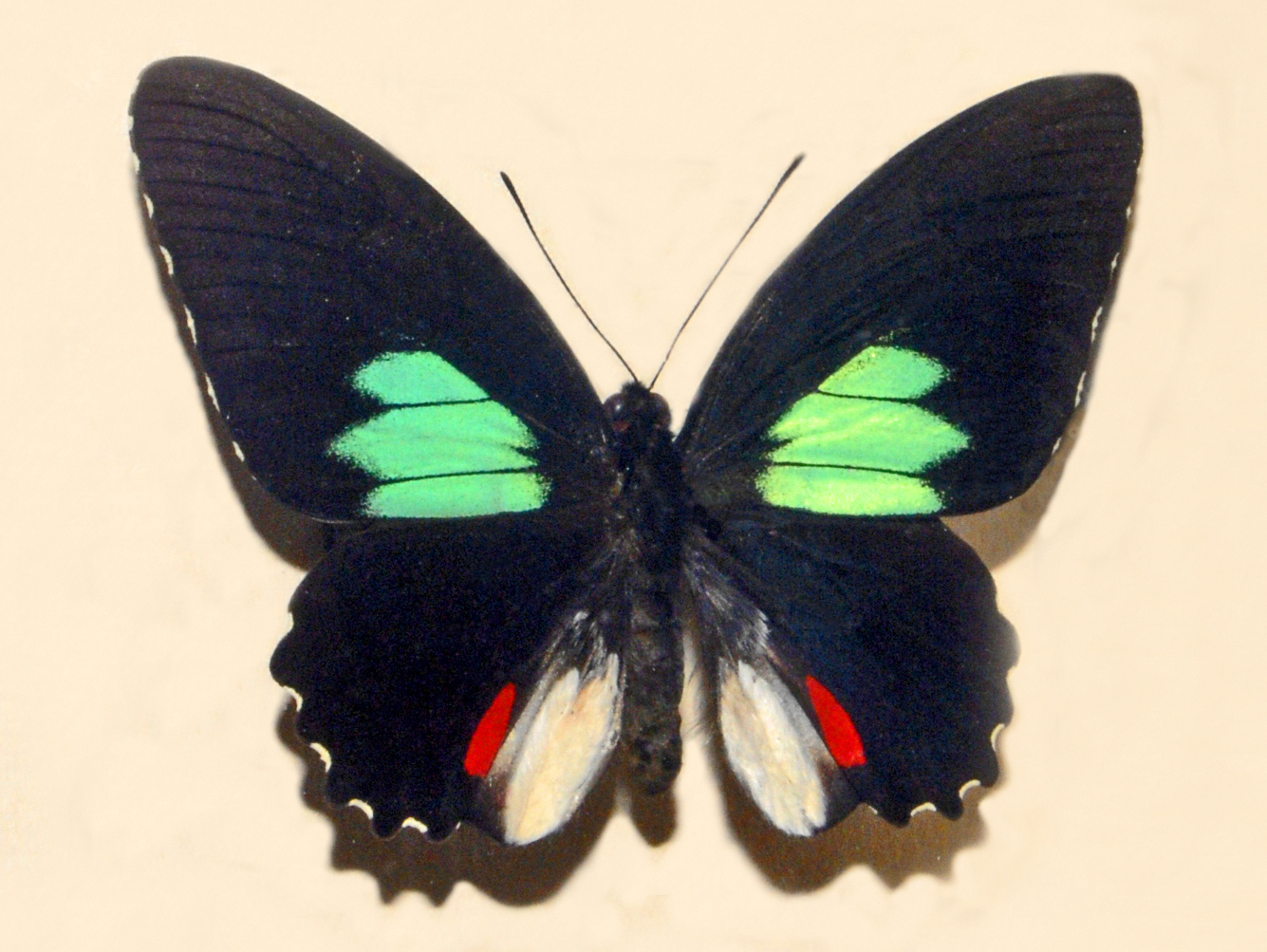
Male P. s. zestos - Museo di Scienze Naturali Enrico Caffi

Parides sesostris has a wingspan reaching 100–110 millimetres (3.9–4.3 in). The head, the thorax and the abdomen are black. The basic color of the upperside of the forewings is black, with large green areas on the basal portion of the forewings. The underside of the forewings is dark brown. The underside of the hindwings is dark brown, with a chain of red spots on the outer edge. The hindwings are scalloped but they have no tails. The larvae feed on Aristolochia barbata, A. bicolor, A. grandiflora, A. sprucei, and A. trianae. It is not threatened.

== Description from Seitz ==
P. sesostris. Forewing in the male with very large green area which touches the cell; hindwing either black or with a red spot before the hindmargin. Forewing of the female with at least two white spots; the red band on the hindwing generally broad. Scent-organ of the male with white wool, except at the base, which is black. Mexico to the Amazon, in three subspecies. — The northern form is zestos Gray (3a). The male has always a red spot on the hindwing. In the female the band on the upper surface of the hindwing is bright red. South Mexico to Costa Rica. — tarquinius Boisd. occurs from Panama to Ecuador and North Venezuela.The upper surface of the hindwing of the male has mostly a red spot as in zestos, but the band on the under face is more obliquely placed. In the female the second white spot on the forewing is somewhat larger than in zestos, and the band on the under surface of the hindwing is nearer to the cell. — sesostris Cr. (female = tullus Cr.) (2d) has very rarely a red spot on the upper surface of the hindwing of the male, and the spots on the under surface are placed somewhat nearer to the margin. In the female the two white spots on the forewing are widely separated from the cell. Orinoco; Guiana; Para to Peru; Bolivia; Goyaz.This species is a strong flier, which appears never to leave the woods.

Seitz P. sesostris sesostris

== Description from Rothschild and Jordan(1906) ==
A full description is provided by Rothschild, W. and Jordan, K. (1906)

== Distribution ==
This species is native to the Americas. It is widespread from Mexico until Brazil and Peru.

== Taxonomy ==
Parides sesostris is a member of the sesostris species group

The members are

- Parides childrenae
- Parides sesostris
