= Sesostris Rock =

Sesostris Rock was a submerged rock that in the 19th century sat outside the entrance to the Yong River, which led to Ningbo. The rock was about one-half mile (0.80 km) east of Pas Yew Islet, which was at 29°57′43″N 121°43′51″E. In March 1865 a buoy was placed over the rock to warn mariners of its location. The location of Pas Yew Islet and the other two nearby isles now appear to be inland, under landfill.

During the First Sino-Japanese War in autumn 1894 the buoy was removed, as were other buoys in the area, and the lights in the lighthouses were discontinued. Also, the Chinese government placed "torpedoes" (naval mines) at the entrance to the river. By October 1895 the navigation aids had been restored. However, the barrier of piles placed across the mouth of the river and the torpedoes laid as defensive measures for the protection of the port had not been removed.

A description of the buoy and its location appeared in List of Chinese Lighthouses, Light-vessels, Buoy and Beacons.

The rock received its name from INS Sesostris, which struck on the rock in 1841.

== Citations and references ==
Citations

References

- Hydrographic Department of the Admiralty of Great Britain (1884) The China Sea Directory, Volume 3.
- Statistical Department of the Inspectorate General of China (1902) List of Chinese Lighthouses, Light-vessels, Buoy and Beacons, for ..., Issues 30-39.
