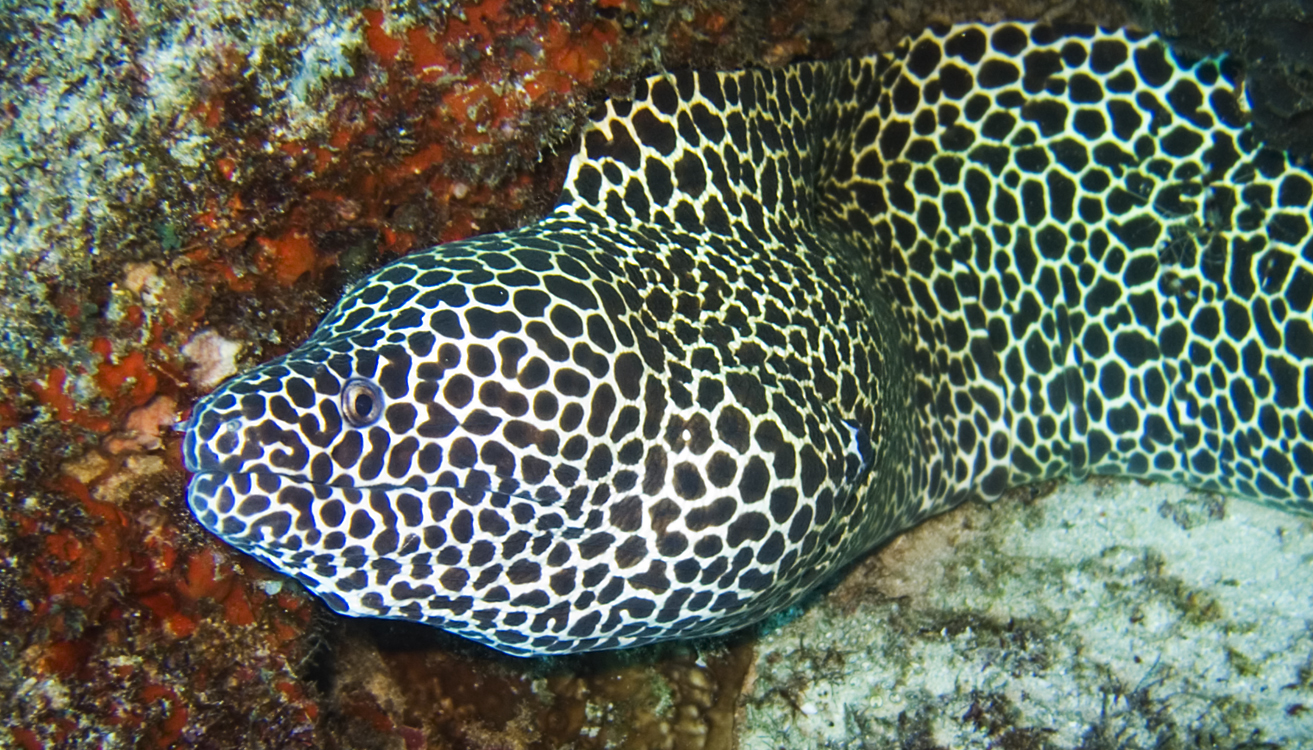

Conservation status
- Least Concern (IUCN 3.1)

Scientific classification
- Kingdom: Animalia
- Phylum: Chordata
- Class: Actinopterygii
- Order: Anguilliformes
- Family: Muraenidae
- Genus: Gymnothorax
- Species: G. favagineus

Binomial name
- Gymnothorax favagineus Bloch & J. G. Schneider, 1801

= Laced moray =

Species of fish

The laced moray (Gymnothorax favagineus), also known as the leopard moray, leopard moray eel, tessellate moray or honeycomb moray, is a species of marine fish in the family Muraenidae.

== Description ==
Gymnothorax favagineus and Labroides dimidiatus at World Ocean Museum in Kaliningrad

Gymnothorax favagineus is a large moray which can reach a maximum length of 3 metres (10 feet), but specimens usually encountered are much smaller.

Its body is serpentine in shape, with a white to yellowish background color dotted with numerous black spots. These spots vary in size and shape depending on the individual and on the environment in which the animals live: morays living on a reef with clear water will have fewer black spots than those living in a turbid environment. This characteristic color pattern is the source of its vernacular name.

== Distribution and habitat ==
The laced moray is widespread throughout the Indo-West Pacific area from eastern coast of Africa, Red Sea included, to Papua New Guinea and from southern Japan to the Great Barrier Reef.

It lives on the outer slopes of coral reefs. During the day, it sits sheltered in crevices between 1 and 45 meters (3.3 and 147.6 feet) deep.

== Diet and feeding habits ==
The laced moray is carnivorous. It leaves its lair at night to actively hunt its prey along the reef. It feeds mainly on small fish and cephalopods. Large adults are prone to be aggressive in the wild.
