= Chetlat Island =

Island in the Lakshadweep archipelago in India

- Location within India

Geography
- Location: Arabian Sea
- Coordinates: 11°41′N 72°42′E
- Archipelago: Lakshadweep
- Adjacent to: Indian Ocean
- Total islands: 1
- Major islands: Chetlat
- Area: 1.174 km^{2} (0.453 sq mi)
- Highest elevation: 2 m (7 ft)

Administration
- India
- Territory: Union territory of Lakshadweep
- District: Lakshadweep
- Island group: Aminidivi
- Tehsils of India: Aminidivi
- Subdivisions of India: Chetlat Island
- Largest settlement: Chetlat (pop. 10)

Demographics
- Population: 2,400 (2016)
- Pop. density: 2,044/km^{2} (5294/sq mi)
- Ethnic groups: Malayali, Mahls

Additional information
- Time zone: IST (UTC+5:30)
- PIN: 682554
- Telephone code: 04899
- ISO code: IN-LD-02
- Official website: www.lakshadweep.gov.in
- Literacy: 84.4%
- Avg. summer temperature: 32.0 °C (89.6 °F)
- Avg. winter temperature: 28.0 °C (82.4 °F)
- Sex ratio: 50% ♂/♀

Chetlat Island is an inhabited island in the Union territory of Lakshadweep, India. It is part of the Aminidivi subgroup of islands of the Lakshadweep archipelago in the Arabian Sea. Chetlat is the sole inhabited island of the township of Chetlat Island of Aminidivi Tehsil.

== Description ==
Chetlat is the northernmost and third-smallest of the populated islands of Lakshadweep.

Various sources give its dimensions as:

- 2.68 kilometres (1.67 mi) long by 0.59 kilometres (0.37 mi) wide at its broadest extent
- 2.5 kilometres (1.6 mi) by an average width of 0.5 kilometres (0.31 mi)
- 2 kilometres (1.2 mi) by 0.6 kilometres (0.37 mi).

It covers an area of 1.4 square kilometres (0.54 sq mi), with a very shallow lagoon with a length of almost 1 kilometre (0.62 mi) and an area of 1.6 square kilometres (0.62 sq mi). There is a coral reef off the south and west coasts, extending out about 0.5 miles (0.80 km) from the latter.

It is about 90 kilometres (56 mi) from the city of Mangaluru (formerly Mangalore) and 432 km (268 mi) from the city of Kochi on the western coast of the Indian subcontinent.

== Climate ==
The climate is similar to that of Kerala. Temperatures range from 25 to 35 °C (77 to 95 °F), 27 to 30 °C (81 to 86 °F) during the monsoon season (mid-May to mid-September), with March to May being the hottest months. The humidity ranges from 70-76% most of the time. Average rainfall is 1,600 millimetres (63 in).

== History ==
The islanders were cruelly treated by Portuguese pirates in the past.

Coir twisting was the traditional occupation of the inhabitants, with average-quality Chetlat coir being equal to first-class coir of the other islands in Lakshadweep.

== Facilities ==
The island has a jetty on the northwest side of the island and a helipad at the southernmost point. There is a lighthouse about 1 kilometre (0.62 mi) from the jetty.

== Image gallery ==
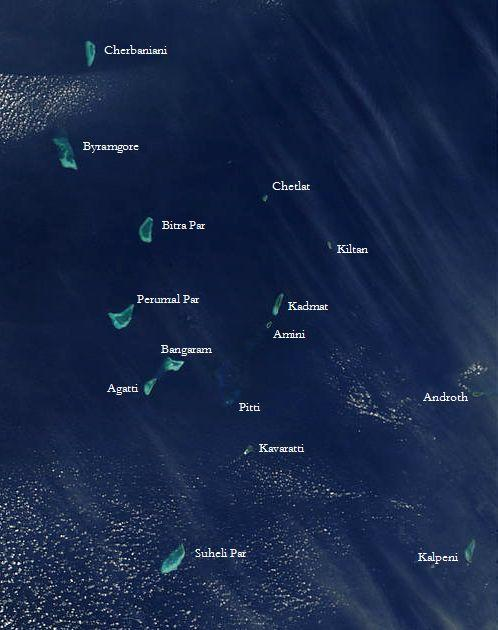
Satellite picture showing the atolls of the Lakshadweep except for Minicoy

Map
