= Atoll =

Ring-shaped coral reef

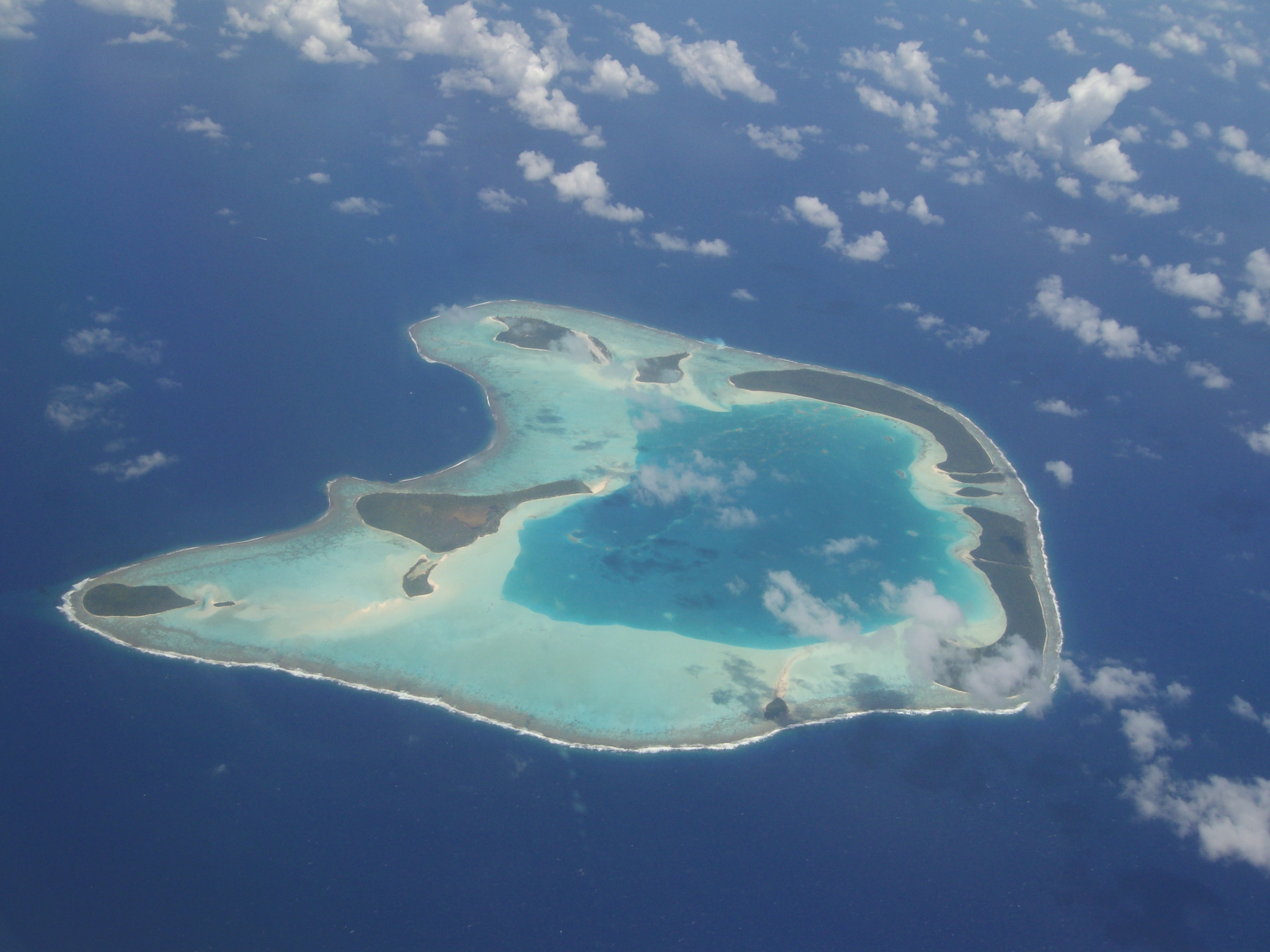
The atoll of Tetiʻaroa in French Polynesia

An atoll (/ˈæt.ɒl, -ɔːl, -oʊl, əˈtɒl, -ˈtɔːl, -ˈtoʊl/) is a ring-shaped island, including a coral rim that encircles a lagoon. There may be coral islands or cays on the rim. Atolls are located in warm tropical or subtropical parts of the oceans and seas where corals can develop and grow in sea temperatures above 20 degrees Celsius. There are approximately 439 atolls in the world, most of them are in the Pacific Ocean.

Two different, well-cited models, the subsidence model and the antecedent karst model, have been used to explain the development of atolls. According to Charles Darwin's subsidence model, the formation of an atoll is explained by the sinking of a volcanic island around which a coral fringing reef has formed. Over geologic time, the volcanic island becomes extinct and eroded as it subsides completely beneath the surface of the ocean. As the volcanic island subsides, the coral fringing reef becomes a barrier reef that is detached from the island. Eventually, the reef and the small coral islets on top of it are all that is left of the original island, and a lagoon has taken the place of the former volcano. The lagoon is not the former volcanic crater. For the atoll to persist, the coral reef must be maintained at the sea surface, with coral growth matching any relative change in sea level (sinking of the island or rising oceans).

An alternative model for the origin of atolls is called the antecedent karst model. In the antecedent karst model, the first step in the formation of an atoll is the development of a flat top, mound-like coral reef during the subsidence of an oceanic island of either volcanic or nonvolcanic origin below sea level. Then, when relative sea level drops below the level of the flat surface of coral reef, it is exposed to the atmosphere as a flat topped island which is dissolved by rainfall to form limestone karst. Because of hydrologic properties of this karst, the rate of dissolution of the exposed coral is lowest along its rim and the rate of dissolution increases inward to its maximum at the center of the island. As a result, a saucer shaped island with a raised rim forms. When relative sea level submerges the island again, the rim provides a rocky core on which coral grow again to form the islands of an atoll and the flooded bottom of the saucer forms the lagoon within them.

== Usage ==
The word atoll comes from the Dhivehi word atholhu (in Thaana: އަތޮޅު, pronounced [ˈat̪oɭu]). Dhivehi is an Indo-Aryan language spoken in the Maldives. The word was first transmitted to François Pyrard de Laval's French as atollon in 1625, this informed Charles Darwin to coin and define in his monograph, The Structure and Distribution of Coral Reefs as a "circular group of coral islets", synonymously with "lagoon-island". The Dhivehi atholhu is ultimately a descendant of *sa(ṃ)teḷə < Insular Prakrit *sa(ṃ)tīṭa corresponding to a reconstructed Sanskrit सम्तीर्थ *samtīrtha "flat connected ford/crossing [between islands]" compounding सम्- sam- "together" with तीर्थ tīrtha "ford".

More modern definitions of atoll describe them as "annular reefs enclosing a lagoon in which there are no promontories other than reefs and islets composed of reef detritus" or "in an exclusively morphological sense, [as] a ring-shaped ribbon reef enclosing a lagoon".

== Distribution and size ==
There are approximately 439 atolls in the world. Most of the world's atolls are in the Pacific Ocean (with concentrations in the Caroline Islands, the Coral Sea Islands, the Marshall Islands, the Tuamotu Islands, Kiribati, Tokelau, and Tuvalu) and the Indian Ocean (the Chagos Archipelago, Lakshadweep, the atolls of the Maldives, and the Outer Islands of Seychelles). In addition, Indonesia also has several atolls spread across the archipelago, such as in the Thousand Islands, Taka Bonerate Islands, and atolls in the Raja Ampat Islands. The Atlantic Ocean has no large groups of atolls, other than eight atolls east of Nicaragua that belong to the Colombian department of San Andres and Providencia in the Caribbean.

Reef-building corals will thrive only in warm tropical and subtropical waters of oceans and seas, and therefore atolls are found only in the tropics and subtropics. The northernmost atoll in the world is Kure Atoll at 28°25′ N, along with other atolls of the Northwestern Hawaiian Islands. The southernmost atolls in the world are Elizabeth Reef at 29°57′ S, and nearby Middleton Reef at 29°27′ S, in the Tasman Sea, both of which are part of the Coral Sea Islands Territory. The next southerly atoll is Ducie Island in the Pitcairn Islands Group, at 24°41′ S. The atoll closest to the Equator is Aranuka of Kiribati. Its southern tip is just 13 km (8 mi) north of the Equator.

Bermuda is sometimes claimed as the "northernmost atoll" at a latitude of 32°18′ N. At this latitude, coral reefs would not develop without the warming waters of the Gulf Stream. However, Bermuda is termed a pseudo-atoll because its general form resembles that of an atoll but has several distinguishing characteristics: high elevations, mostly submerged reefs, and a wide reef-front terrace.

In most cases, the land area of an atoll is very small in comparison to the total area. Atoll islands are low lying, with their elevations less than 5 metres (16 ft). Measured by total area, Lifou (1,146 km^{2}, 442 sq mi) is the largest raised coral atoll of the world, followed by Rennell Island (660 km^{2}, 250 sq mi). More sources, however, list Kiritimati as the largest atoll in the world in terms of land area. It is also a raised coral atoll (321 km^{2}, 124 sq mi land area; according to other sources even 575 km^{2}, 222 sq mi), 160 km^{2} (62 sq mi) main lagoon, 168 km^{2} (65 sq mi) other lagoons (according to other sources 319 km^{2}, 123 sq mi total lagoon size).

The geological formation known as a reef knoll refers to the elevated remains of an ancient atoll within a limestone region, appearing as a hill. The second largest atoll by dry land area is Aldabra, with 155 km^{2} (60 sq mi). Huvadhu Atoll, situated in the southern region of the Maldives, holds the distinction of being the largest atoll based on the sheer number of islands it comprises, with a total of 255 individual islands.

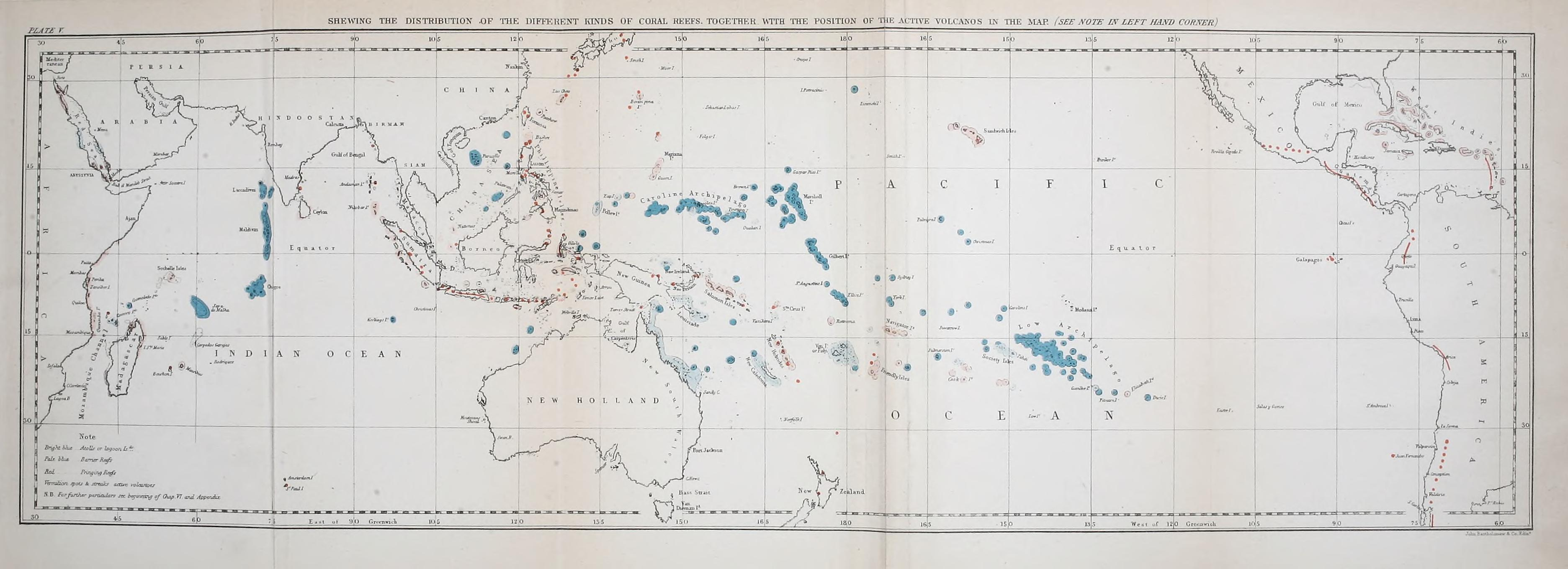
Map from Charles Darwin's 1842 The Structure and Distribution of Coral Reefs showing the world's major groups of atolls and coral reefs

=== List of atolls ===
Largest atolls by total area (lagoon plus reef and dry land)
Name	Position	Location	Land area (km^{2})	Total area (km^{2})	Notes
Great Chagos Bank	6.17°S 72.00°E	Indian Ocean	4.5	12,642	
Reed Bank	11.45°N 116.90°E	Spratly Islands		8,866	Submerged, at shallowest 9 m
Macclesfield Bank	16.00°N 114.50°E	South China Sea		6,448	Submerged, at shallowest 9.2 m
North Bank	9.07°S 60.20°E	North of Saya de Malha Bank		5,800	Submerged, at shallowest <10 m
Rosalind Bank	16.43°N 80.52°W	Caribbean		4,500	Submerged, at shallowest 7.3 m
Thiladhunmathi	6.73°N 73.04°E	Maldives	51	3,850	
Chesterfield Islands	19.35°S 158.66°E	New Caledonia	<10	3,500	
Huvadhu Atoll	0.50°N 73.30°E	Maldives	38.5	3,152	
Chuuk Lagoon	7.42°N 151.78°E	Chuuk, Micronesia		3,152	
Sabalana Islands	6.75°S 118.83°E	Indonesia		2,694	
Lihou Reef	17.42°S 151.67°E	Coral Sea	1	2,529	
Bassas de Pedro	13.08°N 72.42°E	Lakshadweep, India		2,474	Submerged, at shallowest 16.4 m
Ardasier Bank	7.71°N 114.25°E	Spratly Islands		2,347	
Kwajalein Atoll	9.19°N 167.47°E	Marshall Islands	16.4	2,304	
Diamond Islets Bank	17.42°S 150.96°E	Coral Sea	<1	2,282	
Namonuito Atoll	8.67°N 150.00°E	Chuuk, Micronesia	4.4	2,267	
Ari Atoll	3.86°N 72.83°E	Maldives	69	2,252	
Maro Reef	25.42°N 170.59°W	Northwestern Hawaiian Islands		1,934	
Rangiroa	15.13°S 147.65°W	Tuamotus	79	1,762	
Kolhumadulu Atoll	2.37°N 73.12°E	Maldives	79	1,617	
Kaafu Atoll	4.42°N 73.50°E	Maldives	69	1,565	
Ontong Java Atoll	5.27°S 159.35°E	Solomon Islands	12	1500	
Lifou	20.97°S 167.23°E	New Caledonia		1146	Raised atoll with no lagoon
Rennell	11.67°S 160.17°E	Solomon Islands		660	Raised atoll with no lagoon
Kiritimati	1.85°N 157.4°W	Kiribati	312	640	

=== Gallery ===
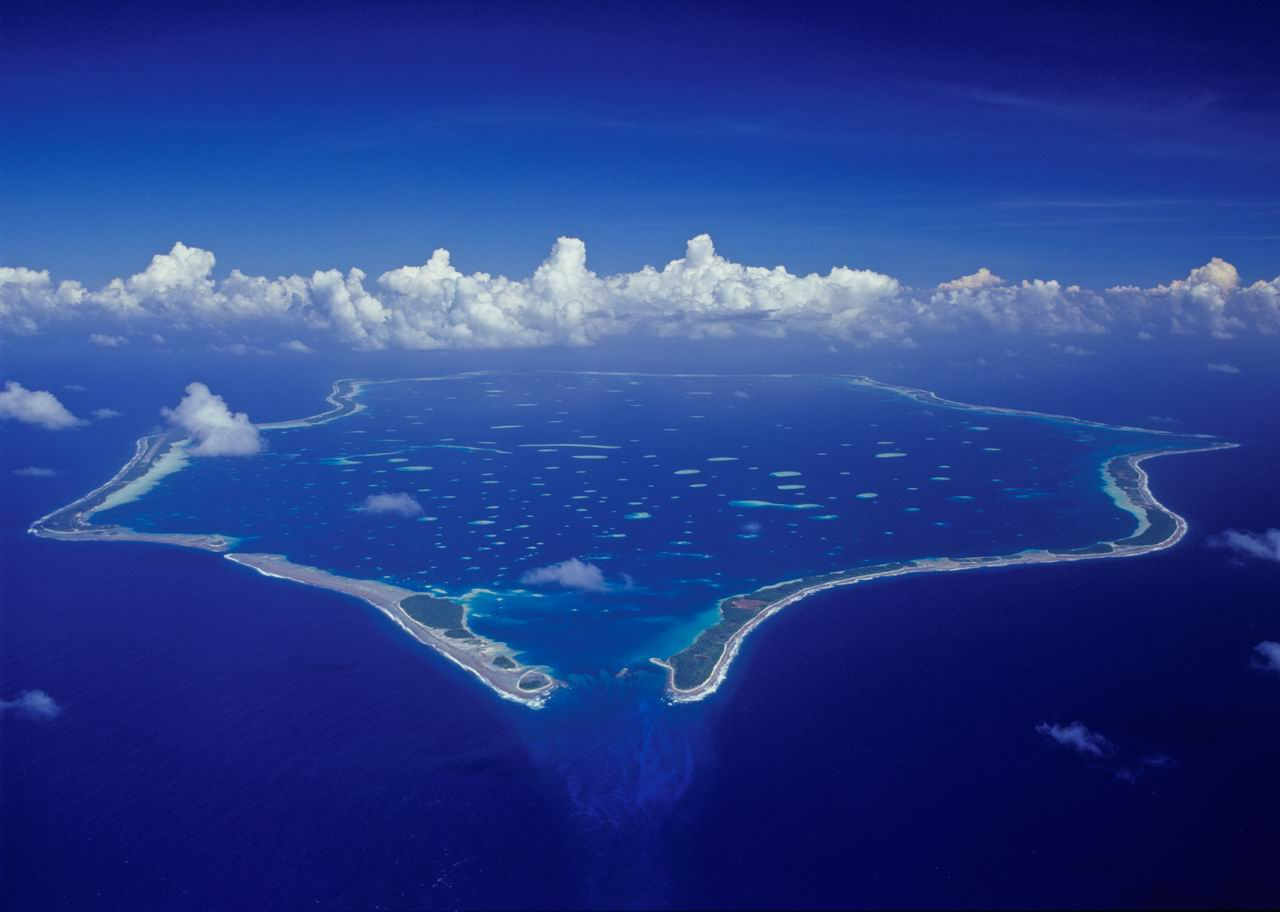
Penrhyn atoll

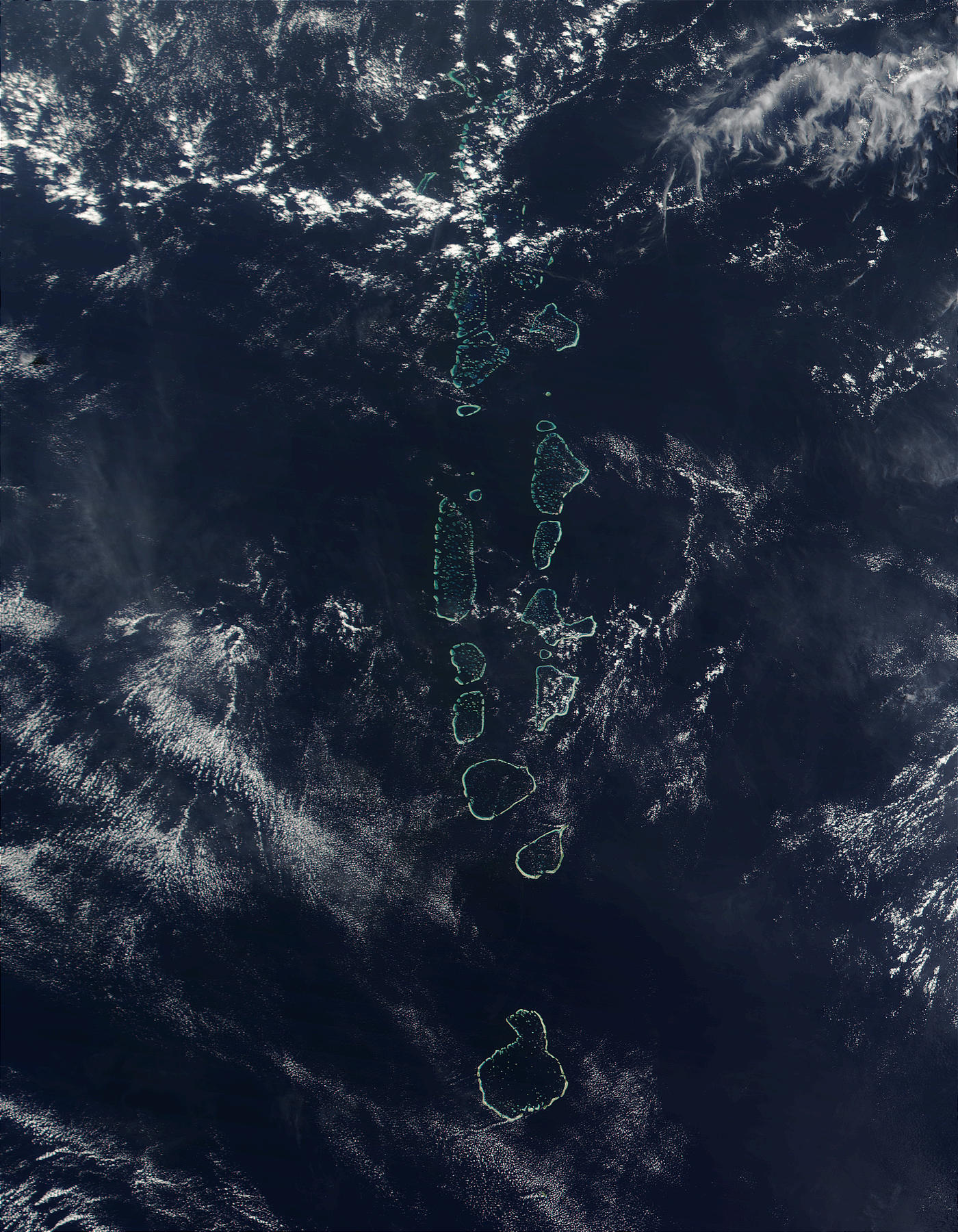
NASA satellite image of some of the atolls of the Maldives, which consists of 1,322 islands arranged into 26 atolls

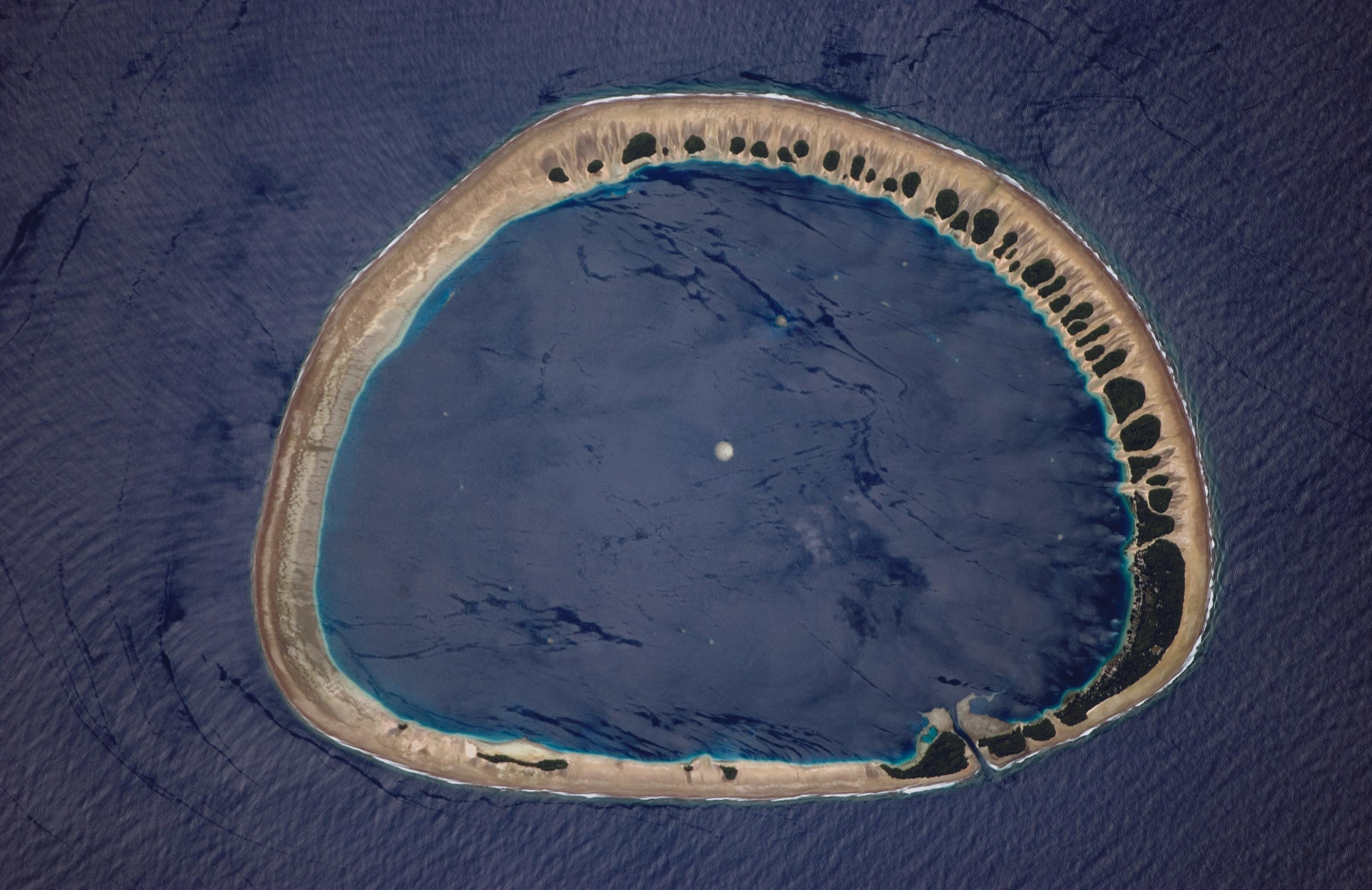
Nukuoro from space. Courtesy NASA

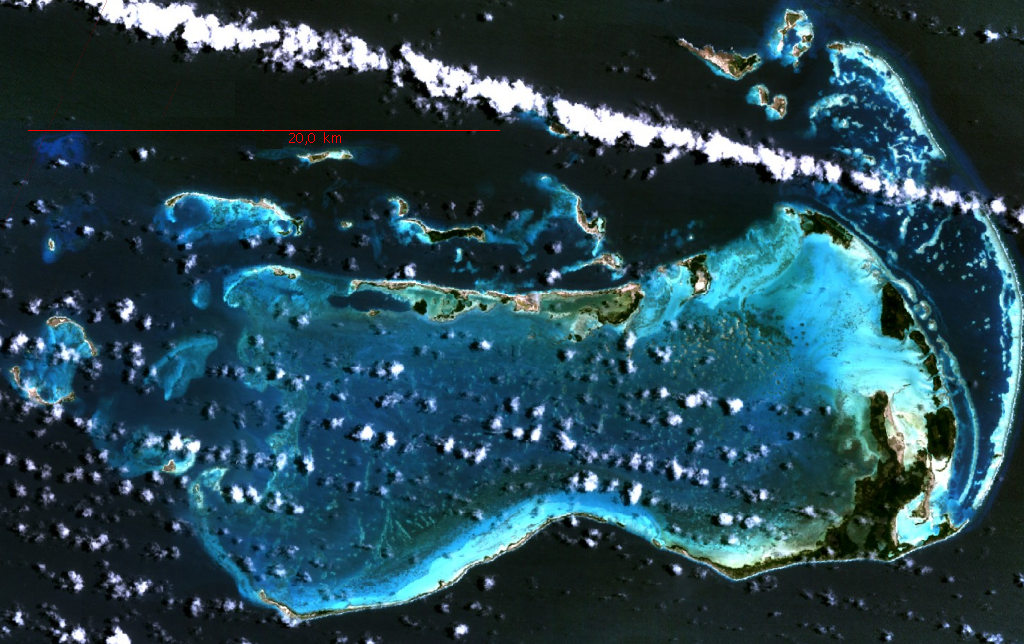
Los Roques Archipelago in Venezuela, the largest marine national park in Latin America, from space. Courtesy NASA

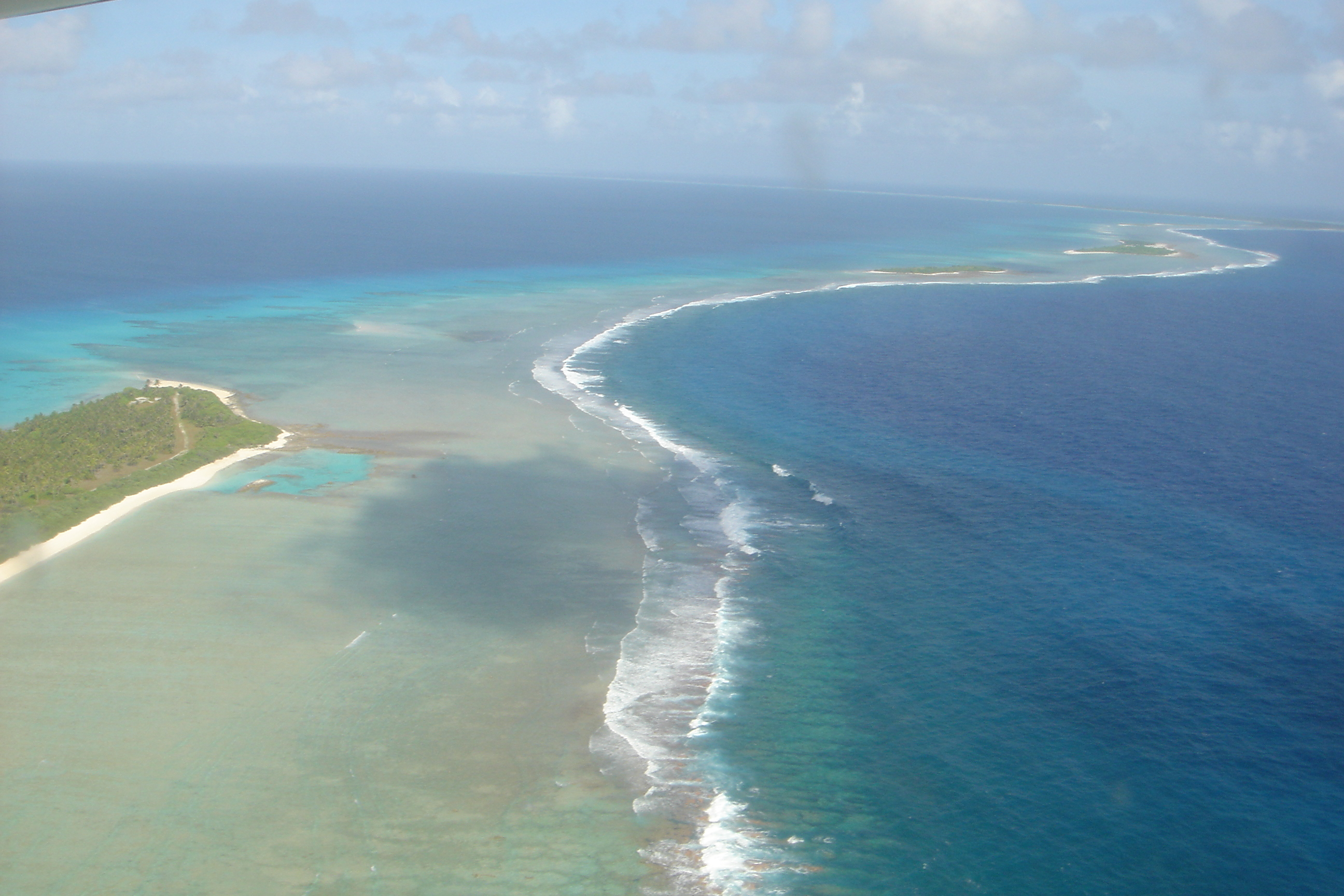
View of the coast of Bikini Atoll from above

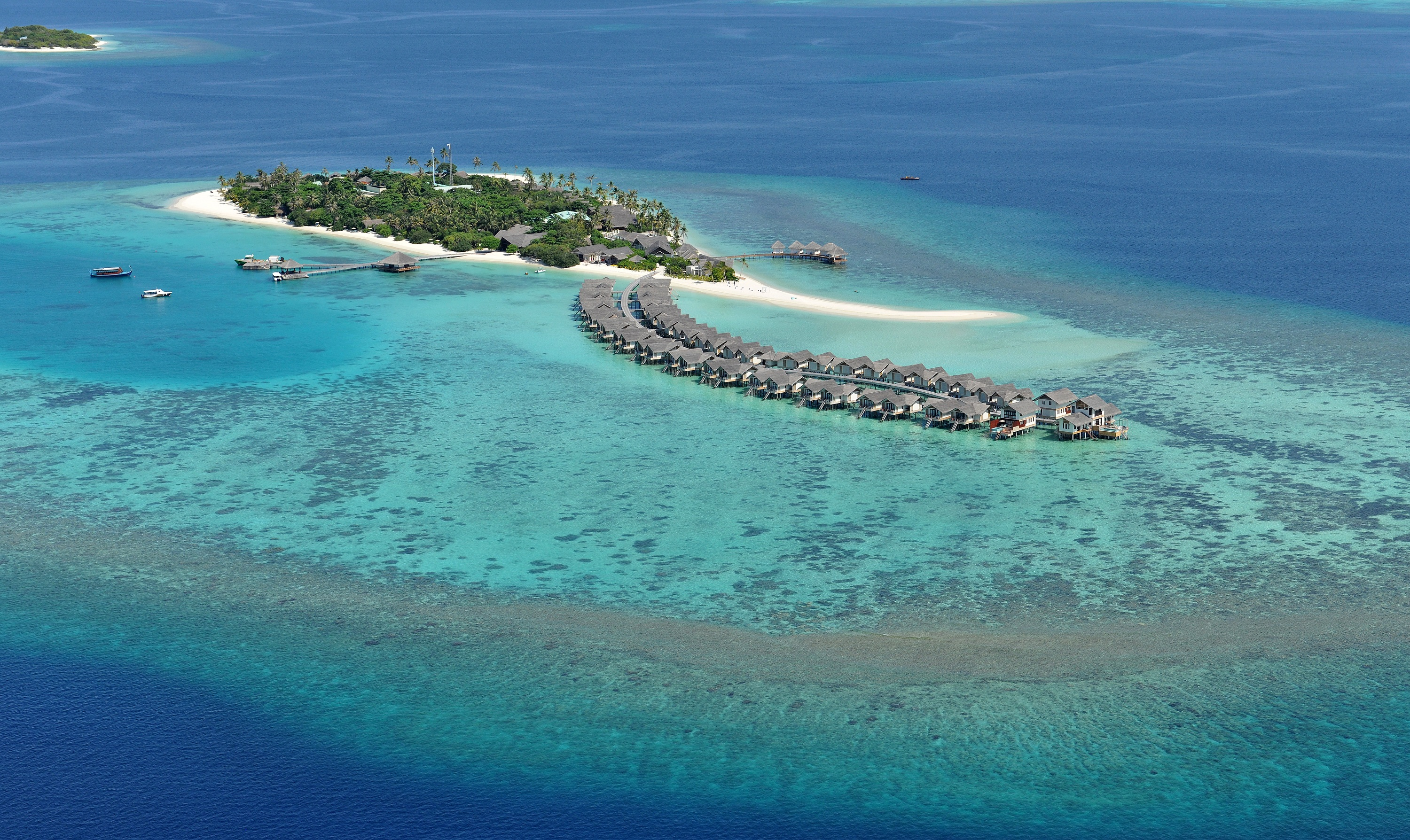
Raa Atoll in Maldives

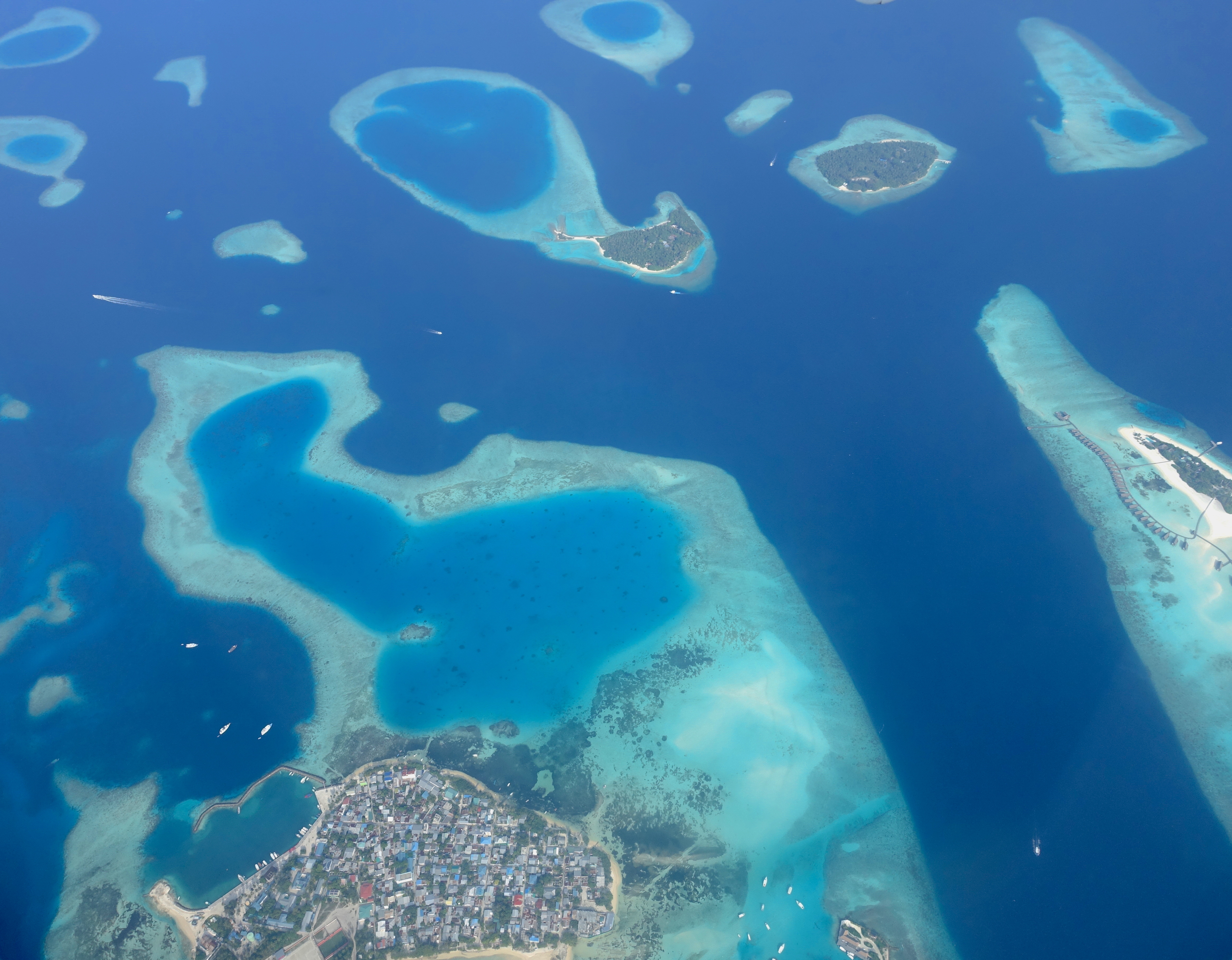
Kaafu Atoll in Maldives

== Formation ==
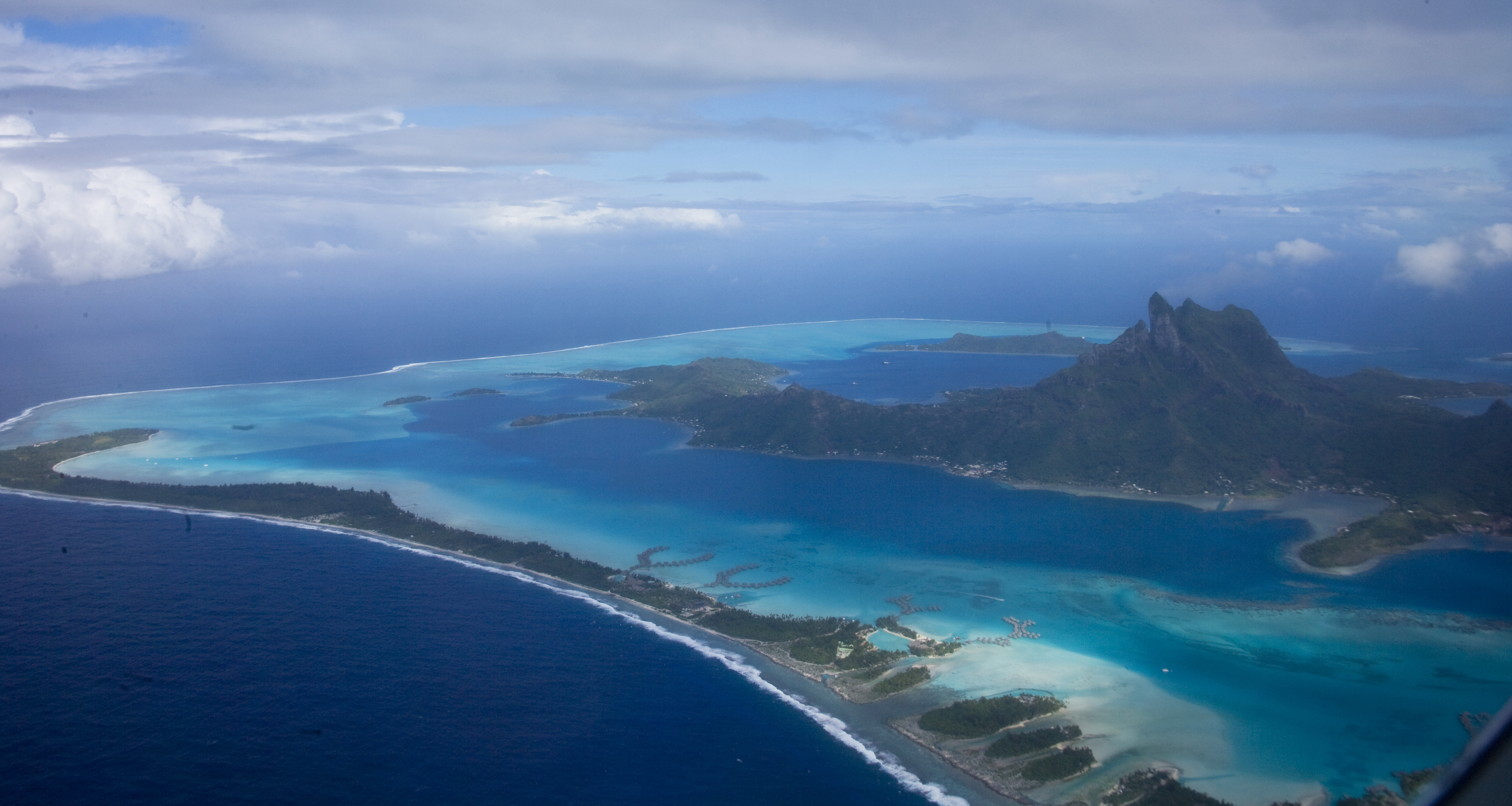
Aerial view of Bora Bora, French Polynesia

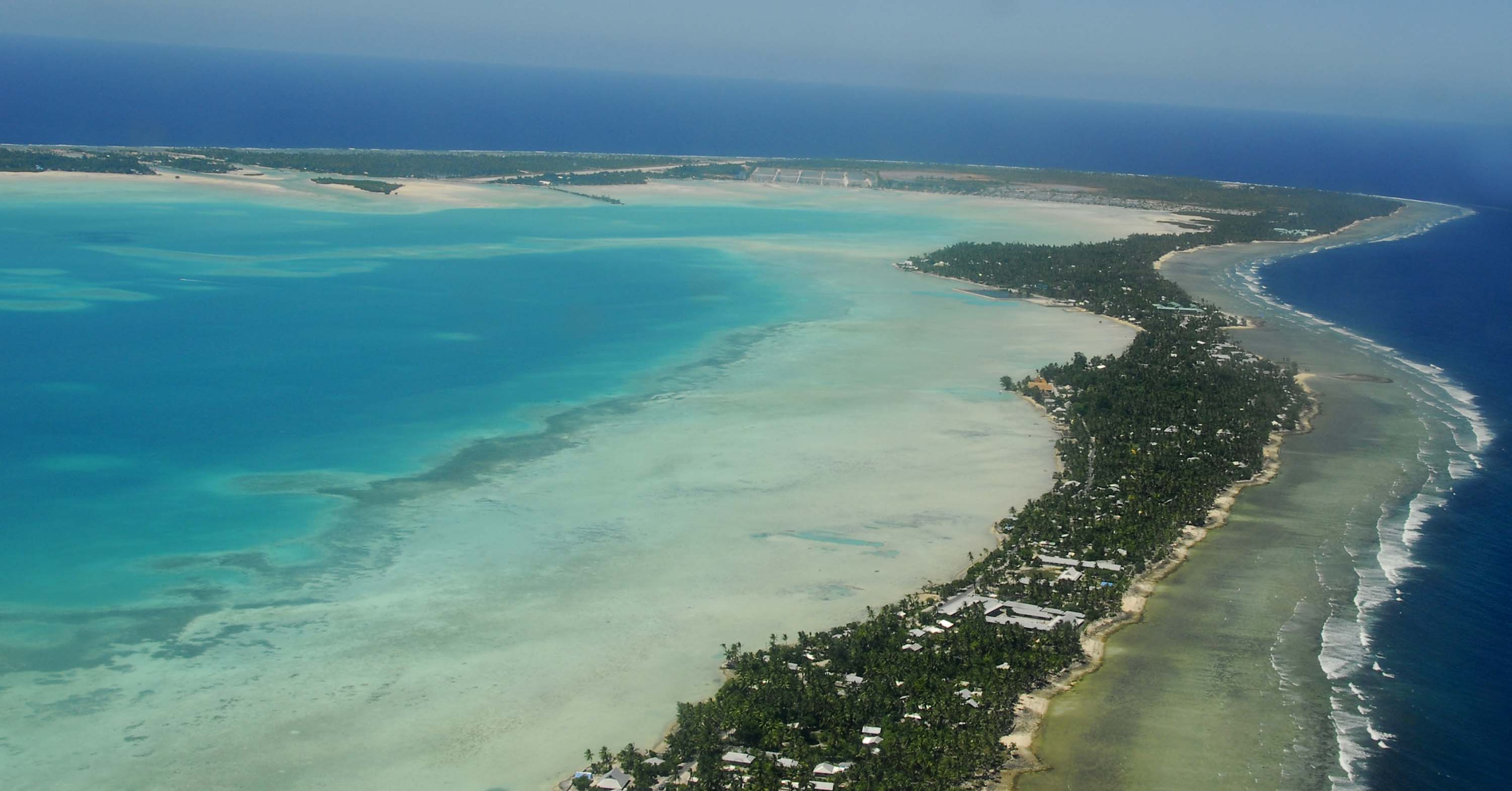
Tarawa Atoll, Republic of Kiribati

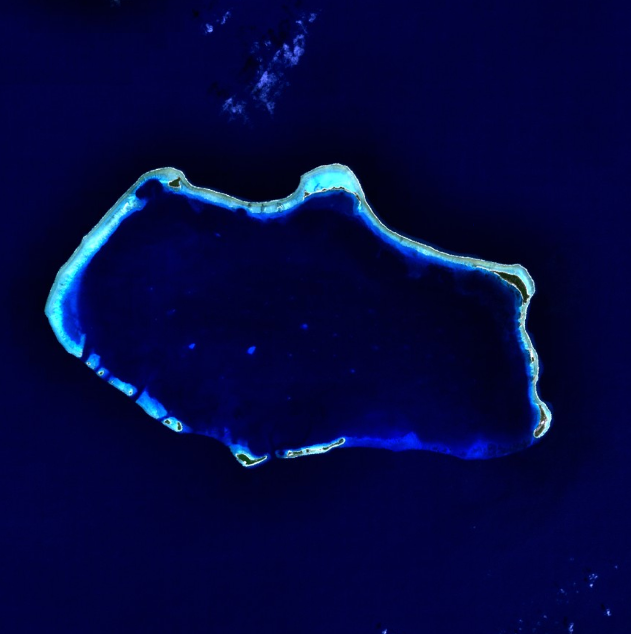
Bikini Atoll, Marshall Islands

In 1842, Charles Darwin explained the creation of coral atolls in the southern Pacific Ocean based upon observations made during a five-year voyage aboard HMS Beagle from 1831 to 1836. Darwin's explanation suggests that several tropical island types: from high volcanic island, through barrier reef island, to atoll, represented a sequence of gradual subsidence of what started as an oceanic volcano. He reasoned that a fringing coral reef surrounding a volcanic island in the tropical sea will grow upward as the island subsides (sinks), becoming an "almost atoll", or barrier reef island, as typified by an island such as Aitutaki in the Cook Islands, and Bora Bora and others in the Society Islands. The fringing reef becomes a barrier reef for the reason that the outer part of the reef maintains itself near sea level through biotic growth, while the inner part of the reef falls behind, becoming a lagoon because conditions are less favorable for the coral and calcareous algae responsible for most reef growth. In time, subsidence carries the old volcano below the ocean surface and the barrier reef remains. At this point, the island has become an atoll.

As formulated by J. E. Hoffmeister, F. S. McNeil, E. G. Prudy, and others, the antecedent karst model argues that atolls are Pleistocene features that are the direct result of the interaction between subsidence and preferential karst dissolution that occurred in the interior of flat topped coral reefs during exposure during glacial lowstands of sea level. The elevated rims along an island created by this preferential karst dissolution become the sites of coral growth and islands of atolls when flooded during interglacial highstands.

The research of A. W. Droxler, Stéphan J Jorry and others supports the antecedent karst model as they found that the morphology of modern atolls are independent of any influence of an underlying submerged and buried island and are not rooted to an initial fringing reef/barrier reef attached to a slowly subsiding volcanic edifice. In fact, the Neogene reefs underlying the studied modern atolls overlie and completely bury the subsided island are all non-atoll, flat-topped reefs. In fact, they found that atolls did not form due to the subsidence of an island until MIS-11, Mid-Brunhes, long after the many the former islands had been completely submerged and buried by flat-topped reefs during the Neogene.

Atolls are the product of the growth of tropical marine organisms, and so these islands are found only in warm tropical waters. The coral reefs that form these atolls thrive at an optimum temperature of 25 °C; the growth rate and speed increases in coral reefs at latitudes closer to the Equator. Polynesian and Indian atoll reefs established and stabilized faster with these conditions in the early part of the Holocene until its thermal maximum, compared to Caribbean reefs which develop steadily and constantly throughout the epoch. Volcanic islands located beyond the warm water temperature requirements of hermatypic (reef-building) organisms become seamounts as they subside, and are eroded away at the surface. An island that is located where the ocean water temperatures are just sufficiently warm for upward reef growth to keep pace with the rate of subsidence is said to be at the Darwin Point. Islands in colder, more polar regions evolve toward seamounts or guyots; warmer, more equatorial islands evolve toward atolls, for example Kure Atoll. However, ancient atolls during the Mesozoic appear to exhibit different growth and evolution patterns.

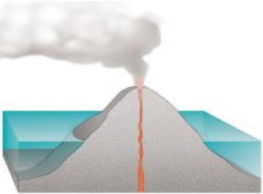
Darwin's theory starts with a volcanic island which becomes extinct

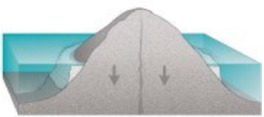
As the island and ocean floor subside, coral growth builds a fringing reef, often including a shallow lagoon between the land and the main reef

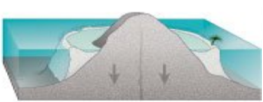
As the subsidence continues the fringing reef becomes a larger barrier reef farther from the shore with a bigger and deeper lagoon inside

Ultimately the island sinks below the sea, and the barrier reef becomes an atoll enclosing an open lagoon

Coral atolls are important as sites where dolomitization of calcite occurs. Several models have been proposed for the dolomitization of calcite and aragonite within them. They are the evaporative, seepage-reflux, mixing-zone, burial, and seawater models. Although the origin of replacement dolomites remains problematic and controversial, it is generally accepted that seawater was the source of magnesium for dolomitization and the fluid in which calcite was dolomitized to form the dolomites found within atolls. Various processes have been invoked to drive large amounts of seawater through an atoll in order for dolomitization to occur.

== Royal Society expeditions 1896–1898 ==
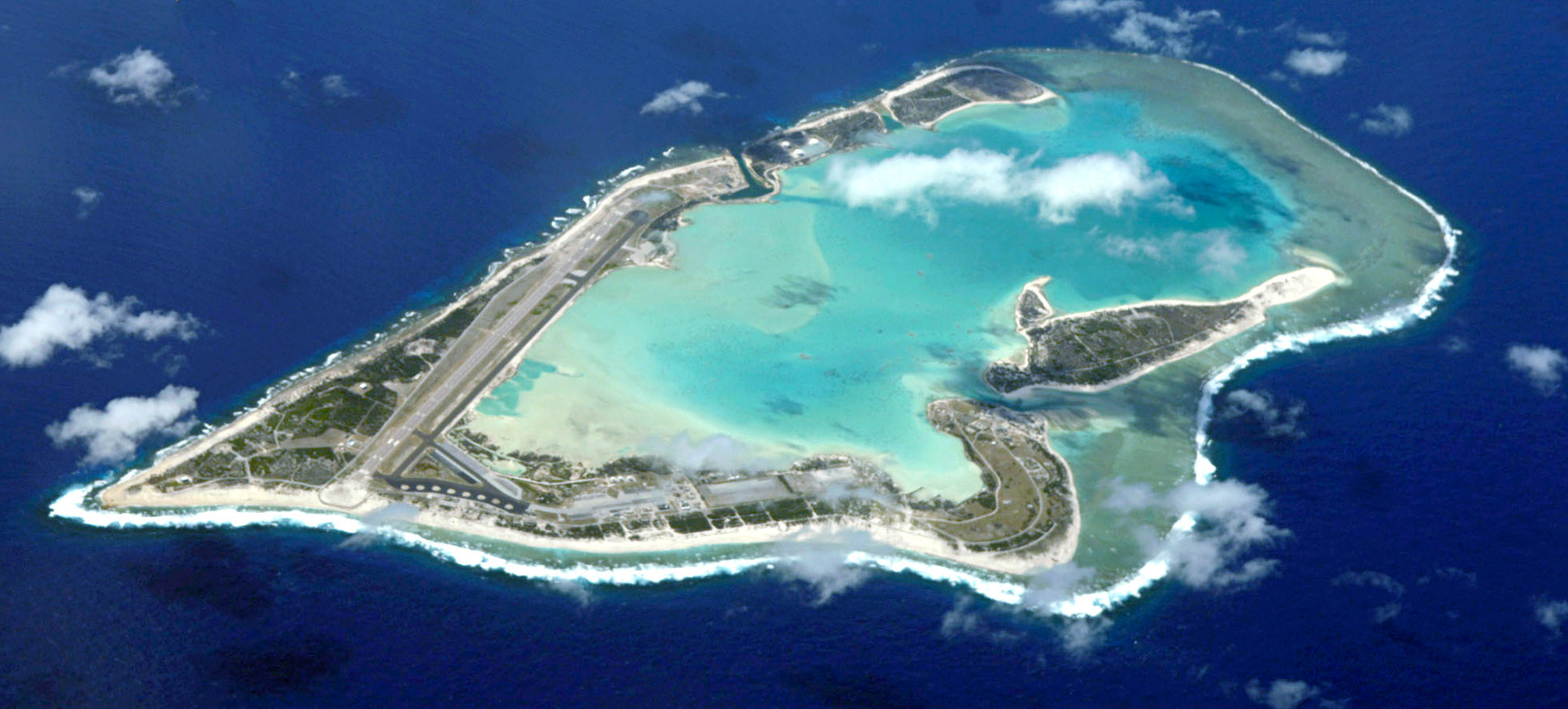
The Wake Island atoll in the Pacific Islands Heritage Marine National Monument

In 1896, 1897 and 1898, the Royal Society of London carried out drilling on Funafuti atoll in Tuvalu for the purpose of investigating the formation of coral reefs. They wanted to determine whether traces of shallow water organisms could be found at depth in the coral of Pacific atolls. This investigation followed the work on the structure and distribution of coral reefs conducted by Charles Darwin in the Pacific.

The first expedition in 1896 was led by William Johnson Sollas of the University of Oxford. Geologists included Walter George Woolnough and Edgeworth David of the University of Sydney. David led the expedition in 1897. The third expedition in 1898 was led by Alfred Edmund Finckh.

== See also ==
- Baratal limestone, sometimes described as the oldest known atoll
- Coral island
