= List of glaciers of Coats Land =

Following is a list of glaciers of Coats Land in Antarctica. This list may not reflect recently named glaciers in Coats Land.

- Blaiklock Glacier
- Cornwall Glacier
- Dawson-Lambton Glacier
- Glen Glacier
- Goldsmith Glacier
- Gordon Glacier
- Hayes Glacier
- Jeffries Glacier
- Lerchenfeld Glacier
- Penck Glacier
- Recovery Glacier
- Schimper Glacier
- Schweitzer Glacier
- Slessor Glacier
- Stancomb-Wills Glacier
- Stratton Glacier
- Weldon Glacier
