= Coalseam Cliffs =

Important Bird Area of Antarctica

Coordinates: 79°10′S 28°50′W

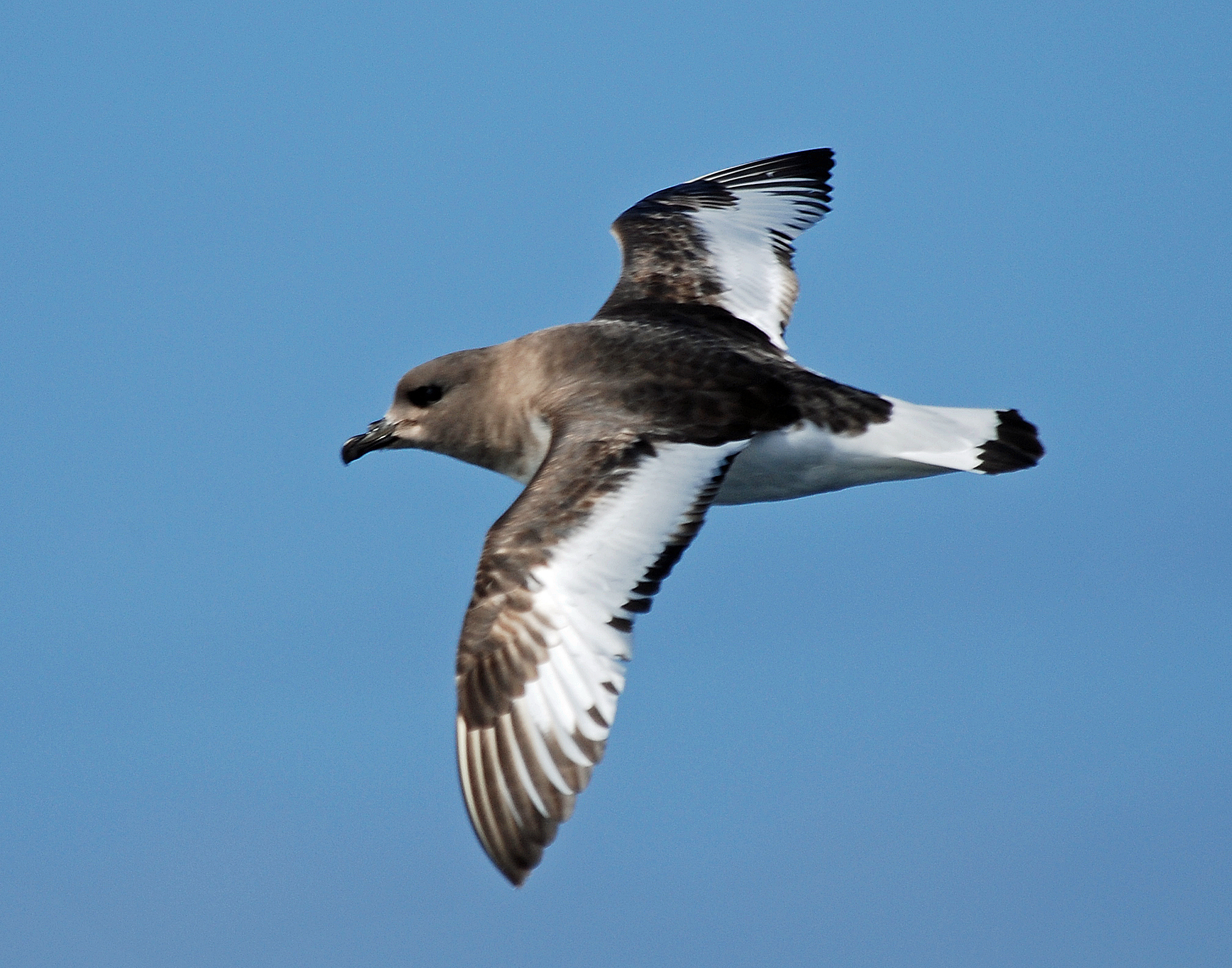
Antarctic petrels breed in the IBA

Coalseam Cliffs are rock cliffs forming the north-western part of Mount Faraway in the Theron Mountains. They were first mapped in 1956–57 by the Commonwealth Trans-Antarctic Expedition (CTAE), and so named because a coal seam was found when members of the CTAE made an aircraft landing there in 1957.

== Important Bird Area ==
Coalseam Cliffs is part of the 665 ha Coalseam Cliffs and Mount Faraway Important Bird Area (IBA), designated as such by BirdLife International because it supports a colony of about 10,000 breeding pairs of Antarctic petrels. The birds nest in a scree-filled hollow between two 60 m high dolerite cliffs, a location also known as Stewart Buttress. Other birds recorded as breeding in the vicinity include snow petrels and south polar skuas.
