= Lenton =

Lenton may refer to:

== People ==
- Lenton (surname)
- Lenton Parr (1924–2003), Australian sculptor

== Places ==
- Lanton, Gironde, France (Occitan: Lenton)
- Lenton, Lincolnshire, England, sometimes known as Lavington
- Lenton, Nottingham, England, a district of the city of Nottingham, including:
  - Lenton Abbey, an administrative district
  - Hugh Stewart Hall, a student residence at Nottingham University, the oldest portion of which was formerly known as Lenton Hall
  - Lenton Priory, the remains of a medieval religious establishment
  - Lenton and Wortley Hall, undergraduate hall of residence at Nottingham University
  - Lenton railway station, built by the Midland Railway company and closed in 1911
- Lenton Bluff, a rock bluff (cliff) at the mouth of Jeffries Glacier in the Theron Mountains in Antarctica
- Lenton Point, a headland in the South Orkney Islands

== See also ==
- Allenton (disambiguation)
- Ellenton (disambiguation)
- Lento (disambiguation)
