= Littlewood Nunataks =

Group of nunataks in Coats Land, Antarctica

The Littlewood Nunataks (77°53′S 34°20′W) are a group of four lichen-covered nunataks, rising to about 250 metres (800 ft) between Schweitzer Glacier and Lerchenfeld Glacier, on the Luitpold Coast of Antarctica. The nunataks are brick red in color. They were discovered and first roughly charted by the Second German Antarctic Expedition, 1911–12, under Wilhelm Filchner. They were visited by helicopter from the icebreaker USS Edisto on January 28, 1959, by John C. Behrendt of the United States Geological Survey, and Lieutenant Erickson, U.S. Navy, and were named by Behrendt after oceanographer William H. Littlewood of the U.S. Navy Hydrographic Office, who worked in this and adjacent parts of the Weddell Sea area during Operation Deep Freeze 1957 and 1959.
