= Goldsmith Glacier =

Glacier in Antarctica

- Location within Antarctica
- Location: Coats Land
- Coordinates: 78°56′S 27°42′W
- Thickness: unknown
- Status: unknown

Goldsmith Glacier is a glacier flowing west-northwest through the Theron Mountains of Antarctica, 6 nautical miles (11 km) south of Tailend Nunatak. It was first mapped in 1956–57 by the Commonwealth Trans-Antarctic Expedition (CTAE) and named for Rainer Goldsmith, medical officer with the advance party of the CTAE in 1955–56.

== See also ==
- List of glaciers in the Antarctic
- Glaciology
