= Ellerington =

Ellerington is a surname. Notable people with the surname include:

- Bill Ellerington (1923–2015), English footballer
- Bill Ellerington Sr. (1892–1948), English professional footballer
- Harold Ellerington (1912–1986), English professional rugby league footballer

== See also ==
- Ellenton (disambiguation)
- Ellerton (disambiguation)
- Ellington (disambiguation)
