= Lenton (surname) =

Lenton, or de Lenton is a surname, and Anglo-Norman gentry family, originating in the midlands of England. The family are believed to have originated in Lenton (originally spelled Lentone in the 1086 Domesday Book) in Nottinghamshire, the etymology of which is a "hamlet on the river Leen" (some historians have speculated the family may instead have come from Lenton in Lincolnshire, although this was recorded as "Lavintone" in the Domesday Book of 1086 and remained so until at least 1202, meaning "Leofa’s village").

== History ==
While 'de Lenton' is postulated to be a habitational name, one theory suggests that the de Lenton's are descendants of William Peverel, founder of the Lenton Priory. One argument put forward in support of the theory is that Walter the Bishop of Coventry and Litchfield, son of Simon Peverel of 'Langton', took the name Walter de Langton - with the exact location of 'Langton' being uncertain. It is suggested that Langton may therefore be a corruption of Lenton or vice versa.

Gilbertus de Lentone is mentioned in the pipe rolls of Nottinghamshire in 1169.

In the 1100s Geoffrey de Lenton was recorded as a Magister (a title granted to someone with academic authority) witnessing a monastic grant in Staffordshire by Bishop Richard Peche.

In 1175 Everard de Lenton witnessed a grant of lands in Basford, Nottingham and Ashby Magna, Leicestershire.

In the 1180s Magister Geoffrey de Lenton witnesses the Charter of Gerard de Pucella bishop of Coventry to the monks of the Priory of Coventry, taking them under his protection and confirming to them the land on which their church was founded, together with the chapels pertaining to the same. The Chapel of St James at Willenhall was one of these chapels. This is the first written record which mentions the name of Willenhall.

Clemence de Lentone is later recorded as holding lands in Huntingdonshire and Derbyshire in the 1273 Hundred Rolls.

In 1289 Thomas de Lenton was serving as Seneschal to Walter de Wenlok, Abbott of Westminster Abbey. After his death Thomas would be buried in the graveyard at Westminster Abbey. On a later visit to the Vatican, Alexander de Pershore Archdeacon of Westminster would obtain a Papal Indulgence from Pope Boniface VIII for the soul of "his friend" Thomas.

Archdeacon Alexander de Pershore would become friends with Thomas de Lenton's kinsman, gentleman John de Lenton, a landowner, with property in Long Ditch, Westminster. John de Lenton, had a dislike for King Edward, and he and the Archdeacon would be involved in a plot to heist the Kings treasury, known as the 1303 Westminster Abbey Royal Treasury and Refectory raids. The treasure, possibly including Llywelyn's coronet, was stolen at a time the King could ill afford it, and found its way into the hands of people across London. Silver goblets were dredged from the Thames, and treasure found littering the churchyard, and in brothels and pawn shops. The raids caused outrage, as the Archdeacon and several monks were soon suspected of having committing an 'inside job' on the King's treasury, in the supposedly impregnable Pyx Chamber of Westminster Abbey. The King imprisoned the Abbott and Monks at the Tower of London, but they were released when accomplice Richard of Pudlicott, signed a false confession. From further investigations however, John de Lenton became suspected of involvement. He was found in possession of a key to the Abbey refectory, and was indicted. Much of the treasure was recovered and the crown jewels would be moved to the Tower of London thereafter.

In 1385 John Lenton served as Member of Parliament for Shoreham a Royal Port and one of the most important Channel ports in 12th and 13th centuries.

In the reign of King Edward the Second, Robert, son of Geoffrey de Lenton, granted to John de Henovere, the burgess of Nottingham', two selions of arable land. On June 25, 1301, Roger, son of William de Lenton, granted to Hugh de Wolaton, of Nottingham, half an acre of arable land in the fields of Lenton and Radford.

William, son of William de Lenton received a grant of land in Nottingham from Henry, Abbott of Rufford Abbey, witnessed by William de Normanton Mayor of Nottingham around 1300.

Simon de Lenton, served as Bailiff of the City of Nottingham from 1327, to 1328, while William de Lenton, served as sacrist of Lichfield Cathedral before Roger le Mareschall assumed the office in 1346.

In 1350, for his good service in the Kings wars in France, Robert de Lenton of Nottinghamshire petitioned Edward III for a pardon, for the death of John de Swanewyke.

In Derbyshire the de Lenton's historically held several locally prominent clergical roles, with members of the family serving as Vicars in Ashbourne from 1333 to 1349, rector of St Mary's Church in Ilkeston in 1351.

In the reign of Edward I, William de Lenton, while serving as the custodian of Tutbury Castle, was attacked and killed by prisoner William de Tyssynton with an axe. John de Lenton served Henry VI as Reeve in Bonsall in the 1460s (part of the Honour of Tutbery).

John Lenton, a lawyer, served as MP for Huntingdon in Cambridgeshire and later Recorder for the city of Cambridge in the 1400s. John acquired Caxton Manor in Cambridgeshire in 1488. Thomas Lenton is recorded as the rector of Church of All Saints of Sawtry in Huntingdonshire in the 1500s.

John Lenton, a lawyer of Lincoln's Inn and supporter of the House of Lancaster, served as MP for the city of Lincoln in the 1400s, and Chamberlain of the Exchequer from August 1465 to April 1471. He is recorded as having worked for Lord Cromwell.

A Lenton served as vicar in St Michael's Church, Derby from 1487 to 1491 and in the 1540s Edward Lenton was Bailiff of the city of Derby.

The family held the Manor of Woodford (known as Lenton's Manor) in Northamptonshire from 1332, or possibly earlier, until c.1616.

The family became Lords of the Manor of Aldwincle in Northamptonshire between 1463 and c.1616, when it, along with Lenton's Manor, would pass to the Fleetwood family. They would also own the Titchmarsh Manor for a period.

After the death of William Aldwinkle (whose sister Margaret had married into the Lenton family), his relative William Lenton inherited the manor of Cotes Biden, but the family sold it in 1471 to Richard Chamberleyn, son in law of Richard Fowler, the Chancellor of the Exchequer.

Thomas Lenton served as Abbot of Pipewell in Northamptonshire in 1535.

Agnes Lenton of Aldwincle would marry William Marbury, and Agnes would give birth to Francis Marbury in 1555.

In 1584 the head of the family at the time, John Lenton, would be granted a coat of arms: Az. a bend erm. betw. two dolphins embowed and bendways or. Crest—A tiger’s head erased az. tufted, armed, collared, and ringed or

The family also owned and leased land in Buckinghamshire, including the manor attached to Notley Abbey which they leased from at least 1601 and eventually owned. A pond at the Abbey still retains the Lenton family name.

A grant was made by Mary I to Elizabeth Lenton of the possessions of Lord Thomas Grey, son of Thomas Grey, 2nd Marquess of Dorset, at the time of his capture by Richard Mytton in Wyatt's rebellion. Between 1554 and 1562 Elizabeth Lenton and her husband John Danett of Dannett Hall in Leicestershire began court proceedings against Richard Mytton to force him to hand over the possessions. Elizabeth had given birth to, an illegitimate child of Lord Thomas Grey named Margaret (later the wife of John Astley).

John Astley would make provision in his will for Edward Lenton, a barrister at Gray's Inn. As a barrister, Edward Lenton would work for the Lords of Norreys. In 1601 John Fortescue, Chancellor of the Exchequer for England nominated Edward Lenton of Notley Abbey, an acquaintance of Sir John Bolle, to sit for the borough of Chipping Wycombe in Buckinghamshire, though appears to have been unsuccessful. Edward wrote to Robert Cecil, 1st Earl of Salisbury seeking his assistance in the matter, claiming "my Lord Windsor objects [to my nomination] in his letters that I am one that doth but follow my lord Norris, in whose business I now am, yet I hope your honour knoweth that I have given myself as a servant to none but you."

In 1635 Edward Lenton was commissioned by Sir Thomas Hetley, Serjeant-at-law, (a contemporary of Heneage Finch) to undertake an investigation into the Ferrars family religious community at Little Gidding. He sent his findings, which were favourable, as a letter back to Sir Thomas entitled "Letter to Sir Thomas Hetley, knt., serjeant-at-lawe, upon his request, to certifie as I found concerninge the reputed nunnerie at Giddinge, in Huntingdonshire". Though Edward Lenton did not publish the letter, a copy appears to have fallen into the hands of a Puritan radical, who tried to use it to discredit the community, forcing Edward Lenton to send a copy of the original to John Ferrar.

A branch of the family appear to have gone to Ireland. Edward Lenton is mentioned in one fiant of 1591 as "gentleman of the castle and land of Cabbraghe, county Meath, and land in Churchetowne near Tauraghe". Edward Lenton, Esq., of Kilmainham served as Provost Marshal of Ireland in 1623. He received a grant of arms in Ireland based on those of his ancestors: Az. a bend erm. betw. two dolphins embowed bendways or.

Francis Lenton (fl.1629-1653), believed to be of the Buckinghamshire branch of the Lenton family, and member of Lincoln's Inn, was appointed Queen's Poet.

In 1718 John Lenton was serving as Groom of the Chapel Royal.

Branches of the family spread across the midlands, to the counties of Warwickshire (a road is still named for the family near Foleshill) and Leicestershire. They are recorded as Yeoman farmers in Stoneleigh. In Warwickshire they were often involved in the silk industry, such as silk manufacturer Welch & Lenton (historic competitors with Cash's). Members of the Lenton family were elected as Guardian's of the Poor in Coventry, for St Michael's Parish in the 1870s. The Warwickshire Lenton's had been involved in horse racing since at least the 1760s. Lenton & Bray, the Coventry based fuel distributor, sponsored a number of local turf racing competitions, including the Lenton & Bray cup in the 1970s. In the 1880s Lavinia Lenton founded the factory L. Lenton Ltd. in Foleshill, manufacturing 'fancy trimmings'. By 1912 the company held a number of patents including "the Lenton patent hair curler" and Lenton ladies’ cycle dress guards. Though Lavinia’s patent for producing a cycle tyre woven by hand from piano wire was never taken up when registered in 1897, the same system, somewhat modernised, was reportedly used by the first moon landing vehicle some 70 years later.

Members of the Lenton family were also some of the first founders of the Colony of Virginia, settling as early as the 1630s.

In more recent history Lenton's have served as Deputy lieutenant's of Huntingdon and Peterborough.

== Notable people ==
- Alan Lenton designer and programmer of Federation II online text-based game
- Henry Trevor Lenton (1924–2009), English naval historian
- John Lenton (1657–1719), English composer, violinist, and singer
- Libby Lenton (born 1985), world record holding and Olympic gold medalist swimmer from Australia
- Lilian Lenton (1891–1972), English dancer, suffragist, arsonist, awarded a French Red Cross medal for actions in WWI
- Rosemary Lenton (born 1949), Scottish para-bowler and wheelchair curler
- Tim Lenton, Professor in Earth System Science at the University of East Anglia
- William Lenton, Australian rugby league player

== See also ==
- Lenton (disambiguation)
