= Church of All Saints, Aughton =

Anglican church in Yorkshire, England

Church of All Saints
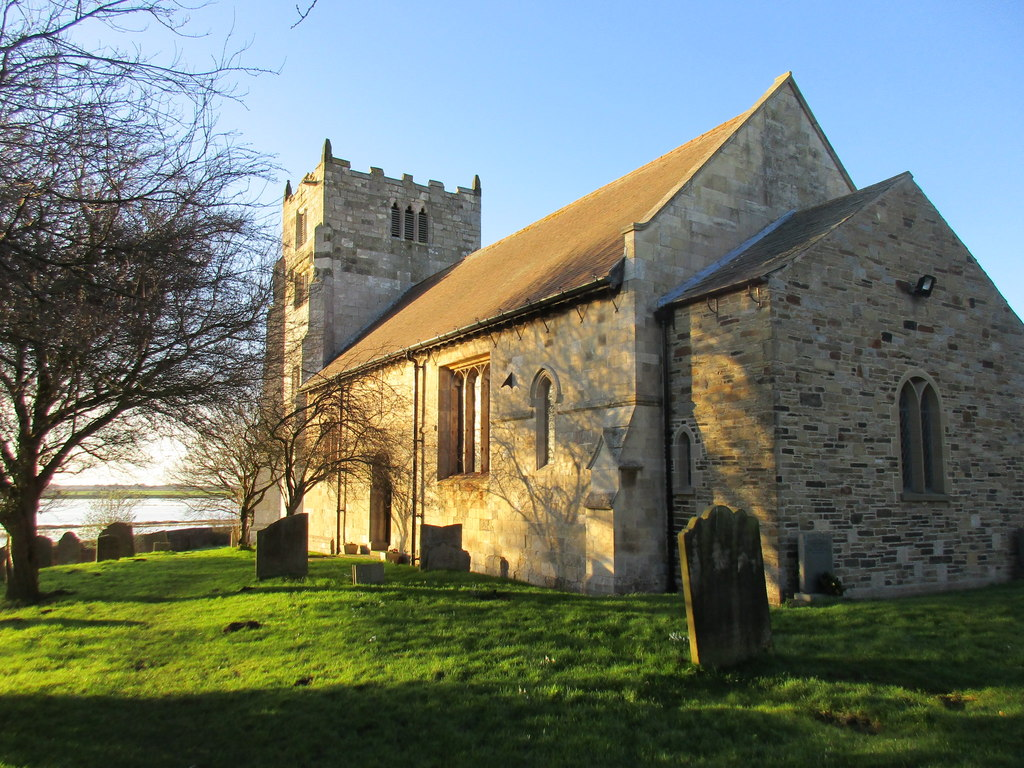
- Church of All Saints
- 53.8395°N 0.9350°W
- OS grid reference: SE701386
- Location: Aughton, East Riding of Yorkshire
- Address: Pasture Lane, Aughton, York
- Country: England
- Denomination: Church of England

History
- Status: Parish church
- Dedication: All Saints
- Earlier dedication: Allhallows

Architecture
- Functional status: Active

Administration
- Diocese: York
- Archdeaconry: York
- Deanery: Derwent
- Benefice: Skipwith, Bubwith and Aughton
- Parish: Bubwith with Ellerton and Aughton

Clergy
- Vicar: Nick Garside

Listed Building – Grade I
- Designated: 16 December 1966
- Reference no.: 1346742

The Church of All Saints, Aughton, is an Anglican church in the village of Aughton, in the East Riding of Yorkshire, England. The church is noted for its Norman arch which divides the nave from the chancel, and is adorned with beak-heads, which are only present in a small number of churches. All Saints was grade I listed in December 1966.

== History ==
The church is located along a muddy track (which is elevated above the old moats for the fortification in the area) off Pasture Lane in the village of Aughton. The western edge of the churchyard borders the Derwent Ings, part of the floodplain of the River Derwent, and a local field drain system known as the Aughton Cut is on the edge of the churchyard. Mee describes the site as "..where the Derwent floods the meadows and washes the walls of the churchyard. The position of churchyard overlooking the floodplain is recognised as a good vantage point for birdwatching, particularly starling murmurations.

The church is said to date back to the late 12th/early 13th-century, but the tower is said to be an addition of 1536, and tied to Robert Aske. (Note: The book Yorkshire returns of the 1851 census of religious worship states that the church was erected c. 1300.) A document from 1231 details how the vicarage was installed there for the incumbent priest and in 1402, the church along others in the area were confirmed as gifts to the Priory of Ellerton by the Hays (or De la Hays) family. On the south-west buttress of the tower is a carving of a newt; this is thought to have been added after the execution of Robert Aske, leader of the pilgrimage of Grace, and owner of Aske Hall which adjoined the churchyard; Aske is an Old English word for a newt. The church has a nave, north aisle, chancel, low embattled tower and a south-facing porch. The nave is Early English and the tower is Perpendicular; large parts of the church were renovated between 1891 and 1893 by Demaine & Brierley, though the chancel was rebuilt in 1839 and then shortened in 1963. On the external wall of the south tower are seven shields, five of which have always been plain without design or mottoes, and an inscription underneath which reads "Cristofer le second Fitz de Robert Ask oblierne doy Ao. Di. 1536". This translates as Christoper, second son of Sir Robert Aske, ought not to forget the year 1536, and is taken as a reference to the Pilgrimage of Grace. The Christopher in question is thought to refer to an uncle of Robert Aske. One of the decorated shields bears the coast of arms of the Ask[e] family, and the other shield is dedicated to the Clifford family.

On the floor of the chancel within the altar rails are two brass figures thought to be Robert Ask (who died in 1460) and his wife Margaret dated to 1466. The brass of Robert is complete, but the lower half of Margaret is missing. The whole slab into which they are inlaid is 72 inches (1,800 mm) by 36 inches (910 mm). The chancel arch is noted for as it is adorned with beakheads and chevrons; it is often cited as being the finest example of Anglo-Norman architecture in the East Riding save for the arch at Kirkburn church.

Henry Jessey was the vicar at Aughton from 1623 until 1624; he "was ejected for removing a crucifix and refusing to practice ceremonies demanded by the prayer book." The incumbent vicar is Nick Garside who holds the Benefice of Skipwith, Bubwith and Aughton in plurality with the Benefice of Riccall, Barlby, Hemingbrough and Cliffe. Historically, the church was in the Deanery of Harthill, now it is in the Deanery of Derwent, and in the Archdeaconry and Diocese of York.

Besides the church building, which is Grade I listed, an 18th-century gravestone south of the tower is also listed at grade II. The motte from an old fortification is to the north and east of the church, which is thought to be the remains of the Aske family residence. The churchyard has a "paucity of gravestones" that pre-date the 1740s, which Pevsner attributed to the lack of good stone in the area, however, there is a gravestone that dates to the 13th-century which has stone from Dorset region, some 270 miles (430 km) away.

=== Names ===
Officially the Church of All Saints; the church is also known as the Church on the Ings due to its western churchyard wall being next to the floodplain of the River Derwent, and has also been called the Pilgrimage of Grace Church, as the leader of the Pilgrimage of Grace was Robert Aske, who was born in Aughton and attended the church there. Historically, the church was referred to as Allhallows or All Souls; many churches were renamed to All Saints from Allhallows in Yorkshire before the 19th century. Only one other church in Yorkshire had a dedication to All Souls before becoming All Saints, and that is in Bingley, in West Yorkshire.

== See also ==
- Grade I listed churches in the East Riding of Yorkshire
- Listed buildings in Ellerton, East Riding of Yorkshire
