= Mount Faraway =

Important Bird Area of Antarctica

Coordinates: 79°12′S 28°49′W

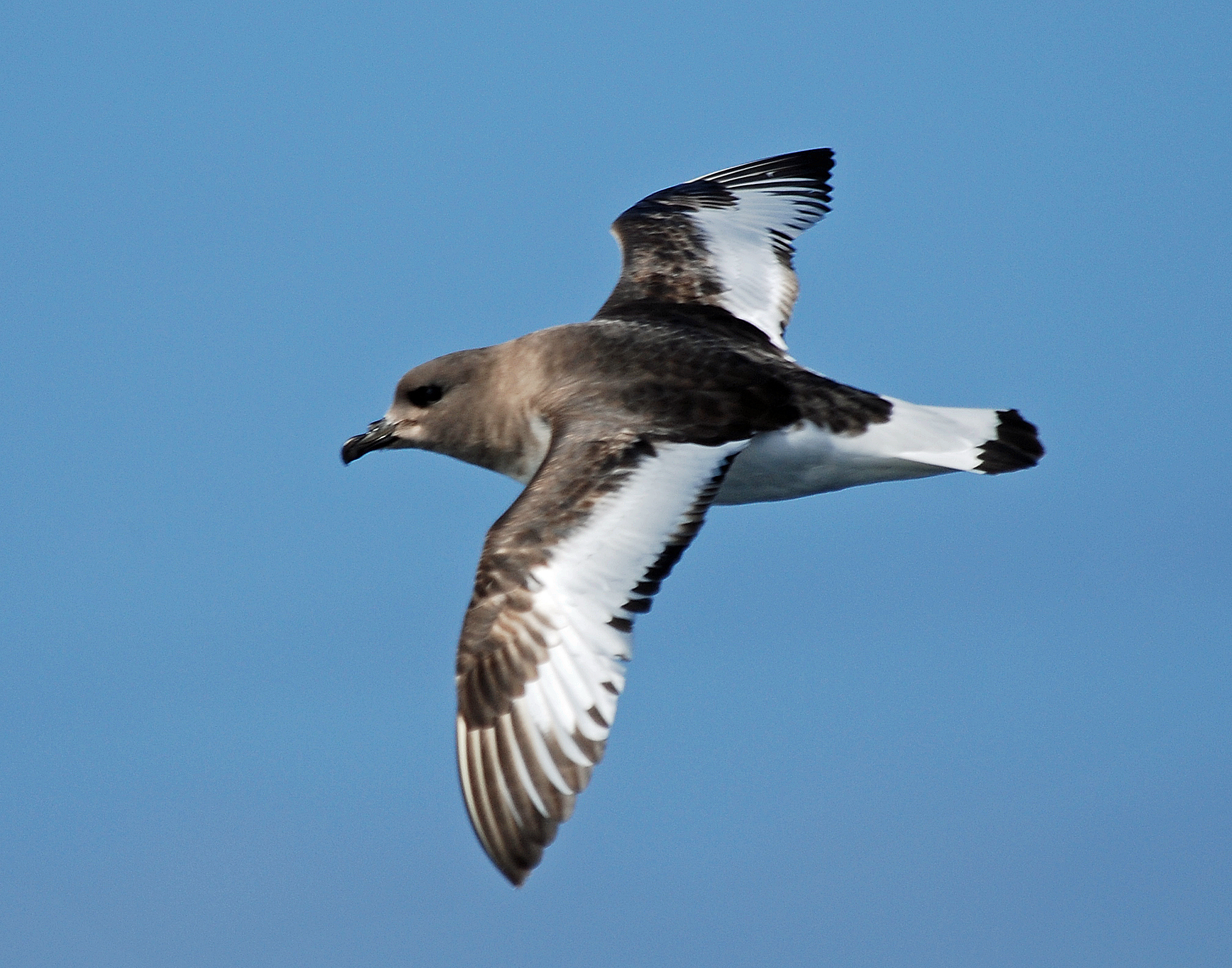
Antarctic petrels breed in the IBA

Mount Faraway is a prominent, snow-covered mountain, 1,175 metres (3,850 ft) high, marking the southern extremity of the Theron Mountains of Antarctica. It was discovered by the Commonwealth Trans-Antarctic Expedition in 1956, and so named because during days of sledging toward this mountain they never seemed to be any nearer to it.

== Important Bird Area ==
Mount Faraway is part of the 665 ha Coalseam Cliffs and Mount Faraway Important Bird Area (IBA), designated as such by BirdLife International because it supports a colony of about 10,000 breeding pairs of Antarctic petrels. The birds nest in a scree-filled hollow between two 60 m high dolerite cliffs, a location also known as Stewart Buttress. Other birds recorded as breeding in the vicinity include snow petrels and south polar skuas.
