= German National Prize for Art and Science =

Nazi German award

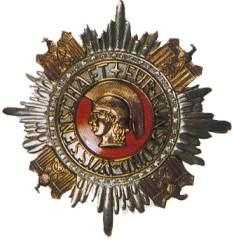
Breast Star of the German National Order for Art and Science

Through statutes of 30 January 1937, the German Führer Adolf Hitler instituted the German National Order for Art and Science (German: Der Deutscher Nationalorden für Kunst und Wissenschaft) as a replacement for the Nobel Prize (Hitler forbade Germans to accept the latter award after the Norwegian Nobel Committee awarded the 1935 Nobel Peace Prize retrospectively in November 1936 to an anti-Nazi German writer, Carl von Ossietzky.) The German National Prize was to be awarded each year to three outstanding German citizens who would each receive 100,000 Reichsmarks which could be equally divided. Along with the prize money the recipient also received a certificate with the Order.

The badge of the Order, a round four-pointed platinum star with four gold National Eagles attached, was designed by Berlin sculptor Hermann Müller-Erfurt. It was to be worn on the left breast. In the centre is a medallion with a red enameled centre with the gold head of Pallas Athene. On an ivory-coloured enameled background in gold letters was the inscription FÜR KUNST UND WISSENSCHAFT (For Art and Science). This was surrounded by diamonds set in a gold border.

The total number of National Prizes awarded between 1937 and 1939 was nine, making it the rarest award given in Nazi Germany. Due to the outbreak of the Second World War in Europe in 1939, no further awards were made.

== Awardees ==
The German National Prize was awarded to nine people.

=== 1937 ===
The award announcement was held on 7 September 1937 and the award ceremony took place on 30 January 1938 by Adolf Hitler in the Reich Chancellery. The first five winners were:

Birth	Death	Laureate	Notes	Posthumous?	Shared monetary award?
1878	1934	Professor Paul Troost	German architect; designed the Führerbau and Haus der Kunst.		
1893	1946	Dr Alfred Rosenberg	Reichsleiter; author of The Myth of the Twentieth Century, a key Nazi ideological work		
1861	1949	Professor August Bier	Surgeon and the first to perform spinal anesthesia and intravenous regional anesthesia. Shared the monetary award with Ferdinand Sauerbruch.		
1875	1951	Professor Ferdinand Sauerbruch	Surgeon and developer of the Sauerbruch chamber, a pressure chamber for operating on the open thorax, and new types of limb prostheses, which for the first time enabled simple movements to be executed with the remaining muscle of the patient. Shared the monetary award with August Bier.		
1877	1957	Professor Wilhelm Filchner	German explorer and discoverer of the Luitpold Coast and the Filchner-Ronne Ice Shelf.		

=== 1938 ===
The award announcement was made on 6 September 1938, the presentation by Hitler took place 30 January 1939 in the Chancellery. The winners of this second year were:

Birth	Death	Laureate	Notes	Posthumous?	Shared monetary award?
1891	1942	Dr Fritz Todt	German engineer, Inspector General of the German Highway System and founder of the Organisation Todt.		
1875	1951	Professor Ferdinand Porsche	German automotive engineer and creator of the Volkswagen.		
1888	1958	Professor Ernst Heinkel	German aircraft designer and producer of the Heinkel He 178, the world's first turbojet aircraft and the Heinkel He 176, the world's first rocket aircraft. Shared the monetary award with Willy Messerschmitt.		
1898	1978	Professor Willy Messerschmitt	German aircraft manufacturer and designer of the Messerschmitt Bf 109, the most produced fighter aircraft in history. Shared the monetary award with Ernst Heinkel.		

== See also ==
- Lenin Prize
- Stalin Prize
