= Jeffries Glacier =

Glacier in Antarctica

- Location within Antarctica
- Location: Coats Land
- Coordinates: 79°2′S 28°12′W
- Length: 8 nmi (15 km; 9 mi)
- Thickness: unknown
- Terminus: Theron Mountains
- Status: unknown

Jeffries Glacier (79°2′S 28°12′W) is a glacier between Lenton Bluff and the Maro Cliffs, flowing northwest for at least 8 nautical miles (15 km) through the Theron Mountains of Antarctica. It was first mapped in 1956–57 by the Commonwealth Trans-Antarctic Expedition and named for Peter H. Jeffries, a meteorologist with the advance party of the expedition in 1955–56.

== See also ==
- List of glaciers in the Antarctic
- Glaciology
