= Caird Coast =

Coordinates: 76°S 24°W

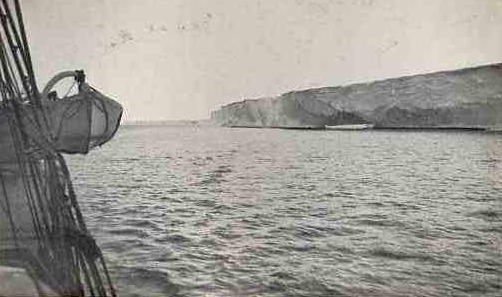
The sheer ice cliffs of the Caird Coast as seen by Shackleton's Expedition in January, 1915

The Caird Coast is the portion of the coast of Coats Land lying between the terminus of Stancomb-Wills Glacier, in 20º00´W, and the vicinity of the Hayes Glacier, in 27º54´W. Shackleton named it for Sir James Key Caird, patron of the expedition.

As part of the ill-fated British Imperial Trans-Antarctic Expedition, Ernest Shackleton continued the exploration southward, joining Bruce's discovery to land which Wilhelm Filchner had discovered from the Deutschland in 1912.
