= Ellerton =

Ellerton may refer to:

== Places ==
- Ellerton, Barbados
- Ellerton, East Riding of Yorkshire, England
- Ellerton, a deserted medieval village in the parish of Ellerton Abbey, North Yorkshire, England
- Ellerton-on-Swale, North Yorkshire, England
- Ellerton, Shropshire, England

== People ==
- Edward Ellerton (1770–1851), English cleric
- John Ellerton (1826–1893), English hymnwriter
- John Lodge Ellerton (1801–1873), English composer
- Nerida Ellerton (born 1942), Australian mathematics educator
- Walter Ellerton (1870–1948), British naval officer

== See also ==
- Ellerton Priory (disambiguation)
