= Lerchenfeld =

Lerchenfeld may refer to:

- Lerchenfeld (noble family)
- Lerchenfeld, a neighborhood of Krems, Austria
- Lerchenfeld Glacier, an Antarctic glacier
- Zugló (German: Lerchenfeld), a district of Budapest, Hungary
