= Schweitzer Glacier =

Glacier in Antarctica

- Location within Antarctica
- Location: Coats Land
- Coordinates: 77°50′S 34°40′W
- Thickness: unknown
- Terminus: Vahsel Bay
- Status: unknown

Schweitzer Glacier (German: Schweitzergeletscher, 77°50′S 34°40′W) is a glacier which drains west along the north side of Littlewood Nunataks into Vahsel Bay. The Lerchenfeld Glacier, trending west-northwestward, coalesces with the lower portion of this glacier. Discovered by the German Antarctic Expedition, 1911–12, under Wilhelm Filchner. He named it for Major Schweitzer, first president of the German Antarctic Expedition Society.

== See also ==
- List of glaciers in the Antarctic
- Glaciology
