= Vahsel Bay =

Western part of the Luitpold Coast, Antarctica

Coordinates: 77°49′S 35°07′W

Vahsel Bay (German: Vahselbucht) is a bay about 7 miles wide in the western part of the Luitpold Coast, Antarctica.

This bay receives the flow of the Schweitzer Glacier and Lerchenfeld Glacier. It was discovered by the German Antarctic Expedition of 1911–1912, led by Wilhelm Filchner. Upon discovery Filchner named the bay for Captain Richard Vahsel of the expedition ship Deutschland, who died during the course of the expedition, reputedly of Syphilis. Filchner later renamed the bay Herzog Ernst Bucht after large portions of the surrounding ice broke away forming a much larger bay, but later explorers have retained the name Vahsel Bay.

Vahsel Bay was the intended destination of Ernest Shackleton and the crew of the Imperial Trans-Antarctic Expedition. They made it all the way through the Weddell Sea and were actually close enough to see the entrance of the bay when their ship became beset by ice. 68 miles was as close as they made it, and thus began one of the most incredible stories of survival in all of exploration history.

== Journey excerpts ==
Insights into the German Antarctic Expedition of 1911–1912 come from the journal entries of its leader, Wilhelm Filchner. His entries from 2–7 March read:

"By March 2, however, Captain Vahsel considered the position of the ship dangerous and he favored taking her as soon as possible to the open sea. On the morning of March 4 accordingly began the return with heavy hearts. We found open water, occasionally streaked with new ice. The course led along the coast of the new found land. From March 5, new ice constantly impeded our progress, and so the course was directed more to the north. Although the ship sailed on March 6 under full steam and, at times, with all sails set, only three miles were covered. On March 7 we dynamited the ice without much success. On the following night the first ice pressure occurred. And so the struggle went on."

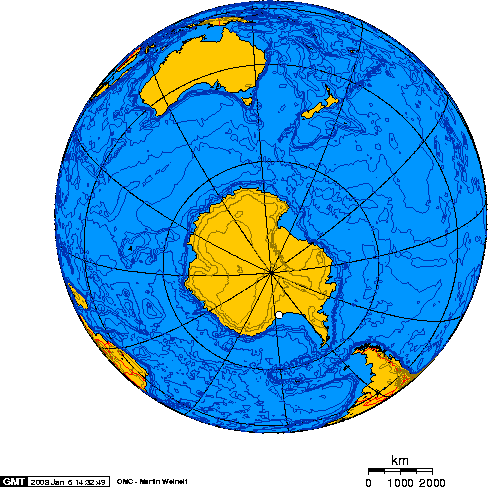
Vahsel Bay (white spot)
