= Weldon Glacier =

Glacier in Antarctica

- Location within Antarctica
- Location: Coats Land
- Coordinates: 76°33′S 29°20′W
- Length: 30 nmi (56 km; 35 mi)
- Thickness: unknown
- Status: unknown

Weldon Glacier is a glacier entering the southeast part of Weddell Sea about 30 nautical miles (60 km) west-southwest of Hayes Glacier. The glacier was discovered in the course of a U.S. Navy LC-130 reconnaissance flight over the coast of Coats Land, November 5, 1967, and was plotted by United States Geological Survey (USGS) from photographs obtained at that time. Named by Advisory Committee on Antarctic Names (US-ACAN) for Don W. Weldon, U.S. Navy, photographer on that flight.

== See also ==
- List of glaciers in the Antarctic
- Glaciology
