= Ellerton Priory =

Ellerton Priory may refer to

- Ellerton Priory (Swaledale), a ruined priory in North Yorkshire, England
- Ellerton Priory (Spalding Moor), a former priory in the East Riding of Yorkshire, England
- Ellerton Priory (parish), a civil parish in the East Riding of Yorkshire, England, abolished in 1935 to form part of Ellerton, East Riding of Yorkshire
- Ellerton Priory Church, a redundant church at Ellerton, East Riding of Yorkshire, England

== See also ==
- Ellerton Abbey
