= Marø Cliffs =

Cliffs in Antarctica

The Marø Cliffs (79°4′S 28°30′W) are prominent rock cliffs standing southwest of Jeffries Glacier in the Theron Mountains of Antarctica. They were first mapped in 1956–57 by the Commonwealth Trans-Antarctic Expedition and named for Harald Marø, captain of the Canadian sealer Theron which transported the advance party and other members of the expedition to the Filchner Ice Shelf in 1955–56.
