= St Mary's Church, Ellerton =

Church building in the East Riding of Yorkshire, England

Coordinates: 53°51′00″N 0°56′06″W

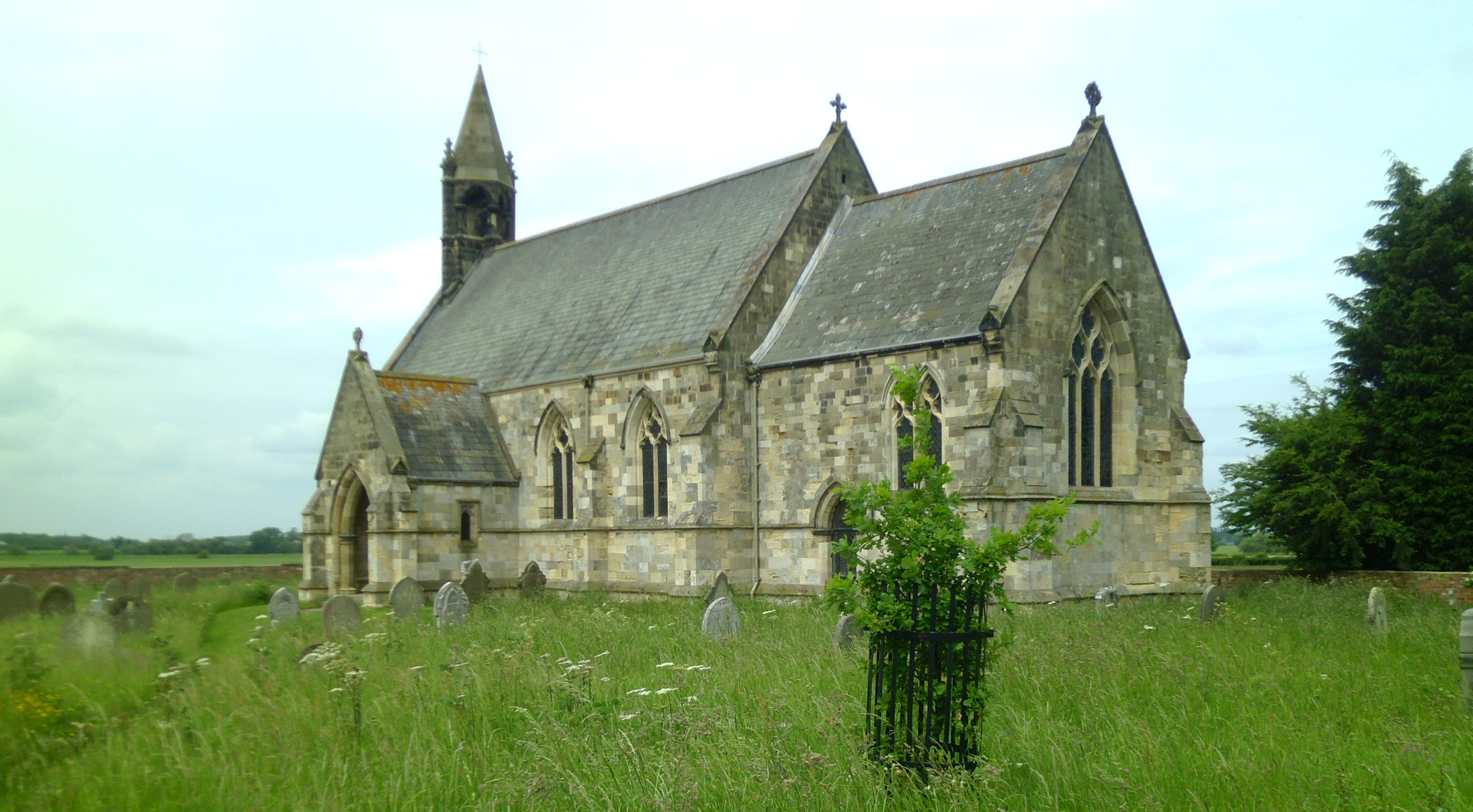
The church, in 2011

St Mary's Church is a redundant Anglican church in Ellerton, East Riding of Yorkshire, a village in England.

Ellerton Priory was founded in the early 13th century, and after the Dissolution of the Monasteries, the village's parish church was on the site of the priory. The church was demolished and between 1846 and 1848 a replacement was constructed, to a Decorated Gothic design by John Loughborough Pearson. The church was grade II listed in 1966. It closed in 1978, and its fittings were removed in 1984, the work including the transfer of 14th-century stained glass to Selby Abbey. The windows were destroyed and parts of the roof collapsed, and by 1995 there was a plan to demolish the ruins. Instead, the Ellerton Church Preservation Trust was formed, and gradually restored the building to a design by Peter Pace, installing new stained glass windows and fittings.

The church is built of stone of varying colours, with a Westmorland slate roof. It consists of a nave with a south porch, and a chancel with a north vestry. On the west gable is two-light bellcote with pointed openings on round shafts, and a pyramidal stone roof.

== See also ==
- Listed buildings in Ellerton, East Riding of Yorkshire
