= Listed buildings in Ellerton, East Riding of Yorkshire =

Ellerton is a civil parish in the county of the East Riding of Yorkshire, England. It contains six listed buildings that are recorded in the National Heritage List for England. Of these, one is listed at Grade I, the highest of the three grades, and the others are at Grade II, the lowest grade. The parish contains the villages of Ellerton and Aughton and the surrounding countryside. The listed buildings consist of three churches, a gravestone in a churchyard, and two houses.

== Key ==
Grade	Criteria
I	Buildings of exceptional interest, sometimes considered to be internationally important
II	Buildings of national importance and special interest

== Buildings ==
Name and location	Photograph	Date	Notes	Grade
Church of All Saints, Aughton; 53.83935°N 0.93518°W		Late 12th century	The church has been altered and extended through the centuries, including a restoration in 1891–93. It is built in limestone and brick, with a tile roof, and consists of a nave, a north aisle, a chancel and a west tower. The tower has three stages, diagonal stepped buttresses with grotesque figures, a five-light west window, and shields in relief and an inscription and date on the south side, over which is a square-headed three-light window with a hood mould. The bell openings have two or three lights, and above is an embattled parapet with corner pinnacles. The south doorway is Norman with a round-arched head, two moulded orders, and scalloped capitals.	I
Gravestone, Church of All Saints, Aughton; 53.83929°N 0.93531°W	—	1710 or 1711	The gravestone is in the churchyard to the south of the tower, in stone, and is to the memory of Boaz Holborne. It has an inscription, it is about 1.5 metres (4 ft 11 in) by 0.5 metres (1 ft 8 in), and lies flat on the ground.	II
Aughton Ruddings Grange; 53.84021°N 0.88421°W	—	Mid-18th century	The house is in brick, with a floor band, a timber beam at eaves level and a pantile roof with raised gable ends and shaped kneelers. There are two storeys and three bays. Steps lead up to the central doorway that has a fanlight, the windows are sashes, and all the openings have flat brick arches.	II
Martin House; 53.85029°N 0.93198°W	—	Late 18th century	The house is in brick, with a stepped eaves course, and a pantile roof with gable coping and shaped kneelers. There are two storeys and three bays. The doorway has a divided fanlight, the windows are sashes, and all the openings are under segmental arches.	II
Ellerton Methodist Chapel; 53.84990°N 0.92838°W		1811	The chapel is in yellow brick, with red brick arches and a hipped slate roof. On the front is a porch containing a doorway with a pointed fanlight and an open shouldered pediment. It is flanked by windows with pointed arches; the fanlight and windows contain Gothic tracery.	II
St Mary's Church, Ellerton; 53.85012°N 0.93513°W		1846–48	The church, designed by J. L. Pearson in Decorated style, is in stone of varying colours, with a Westmorland slate roof. It consists of a nave with a south porch, and a chancel with a north vestry. On the west gable is two-light bellcote with pointed openings on round shafts, and a pyramidal stone roof.	II
