= Dawson-Lambton Trough =

Undersea trough in Coats Land, Antarctica

The Dawson–Lambton Trough (76°S 26°W) is an undersea trough extending from the Dawson-Lambton Glacier terminus. The name, proposed by Heinrich Hinze of the Alfred Wegener Institute for Polar and Marine Research, Bremerhaven, Germany, was approved by the Advisory Committee for Undersea Features in June 1997.
