= Tailend Nunatak =

Nunatak in the Theron Mountains, Antarctica

Tailend Nunatak (78°49′S 27°25′W) is a nunatak, 535 m, at the north end of the Theron Mountains. It was first mapped in 1956–57 by the Commonwealth Trans-Antarctic Expedition and is so named because it was the last rock feature at the northeast end of the Theron Mountains seen either from the ground or from the air by members of the Commonwealth Trans-Antarctic Expedition during their survey in 1956–57.
