= Stewart Buttress =

Important Bird Area of Antarctica

Coordinates: 79°7′S 28°30′W

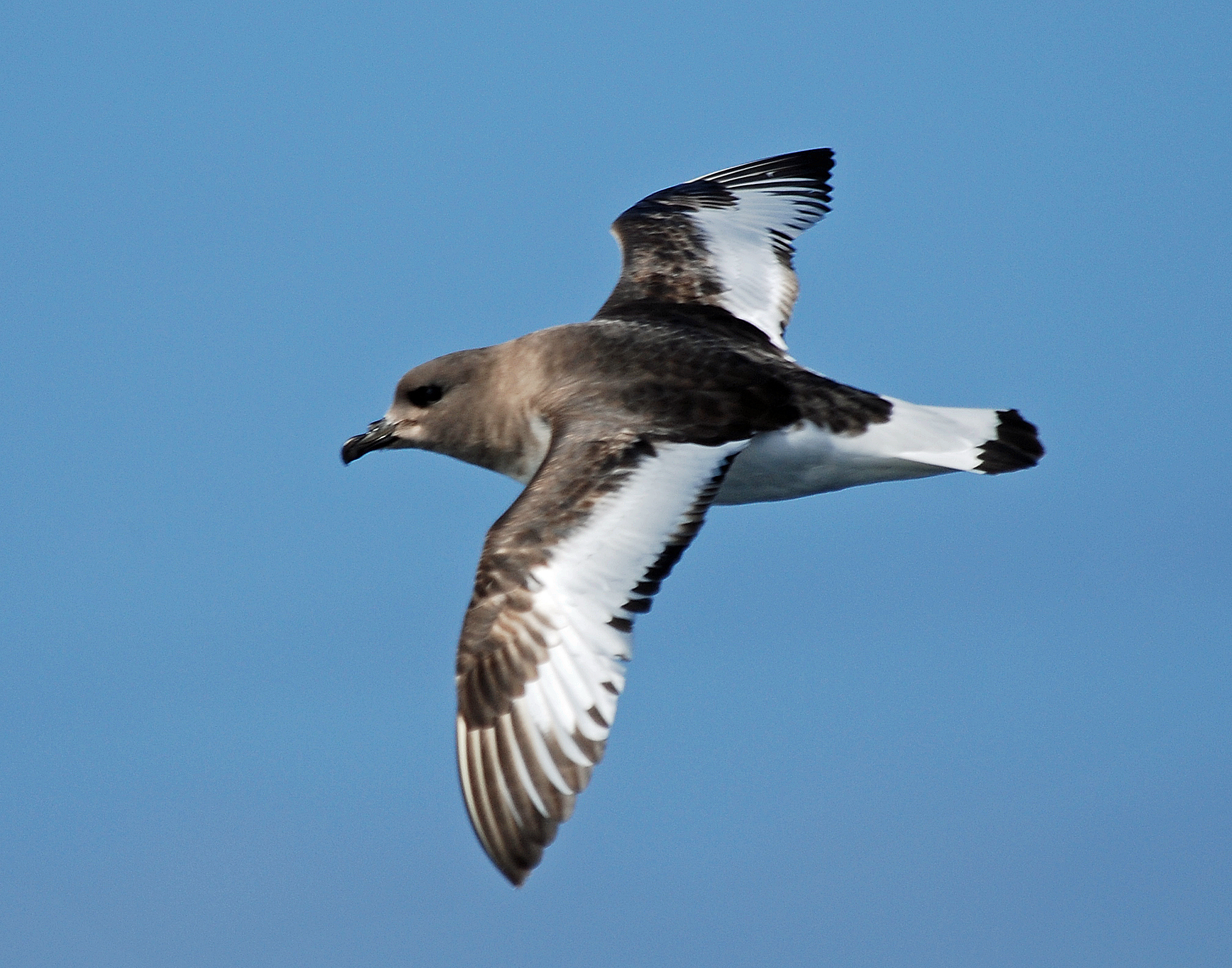
Antarctic petrels breed in the IBA

Stewart Buttress is a rock bluff, 1,005 m high, 3.7 km south of Maro Cliffs in the Theron Mountains. First mapped by Commonwealth Trans-Antarctic Expedition (1956–57) and named for Reginald H.A. Stewart, meteorologist with the advance party of the Commonwealth Trans-Antarctic Expedition in 1955–56.

== Important Bird Area ==
Stewart Buttress is part of the 665 ha Coalseam Cliffs and Mount Faraway Important Bird Area (IBA), designated as such by BirdLife International because it supports a colony of about 10,000 breeding pairs of Antarctic petrels. The birds nest in a scree-filled hollow between two 60 m high dolerite cliffs. Other birds recorded as breeding in the vicinity include snow petrels and south polar skuas.
