= Lenton Bluff =

Lenton Bluff (79°0′S 28°13′W) is a rock bluff on the north side of the mouth of Jeffries Glacier in the Theron Mountains of Antarctica. It was first mapped in 1956 and 1957 by the Commonwealth Trans-Antarctic Expedition and named for Ralph A. Lenton, deputy leader of the advance party of the expedition in 1955 and 1956 and carpenter and radio operator with the transpolar party from 1956 to 1958.
