= Ellerton Methodist Chapel =

Chapel in Ellerton, East Riding of Yorkshire, England

Coordinates: 53.8499°N 0.9284°W

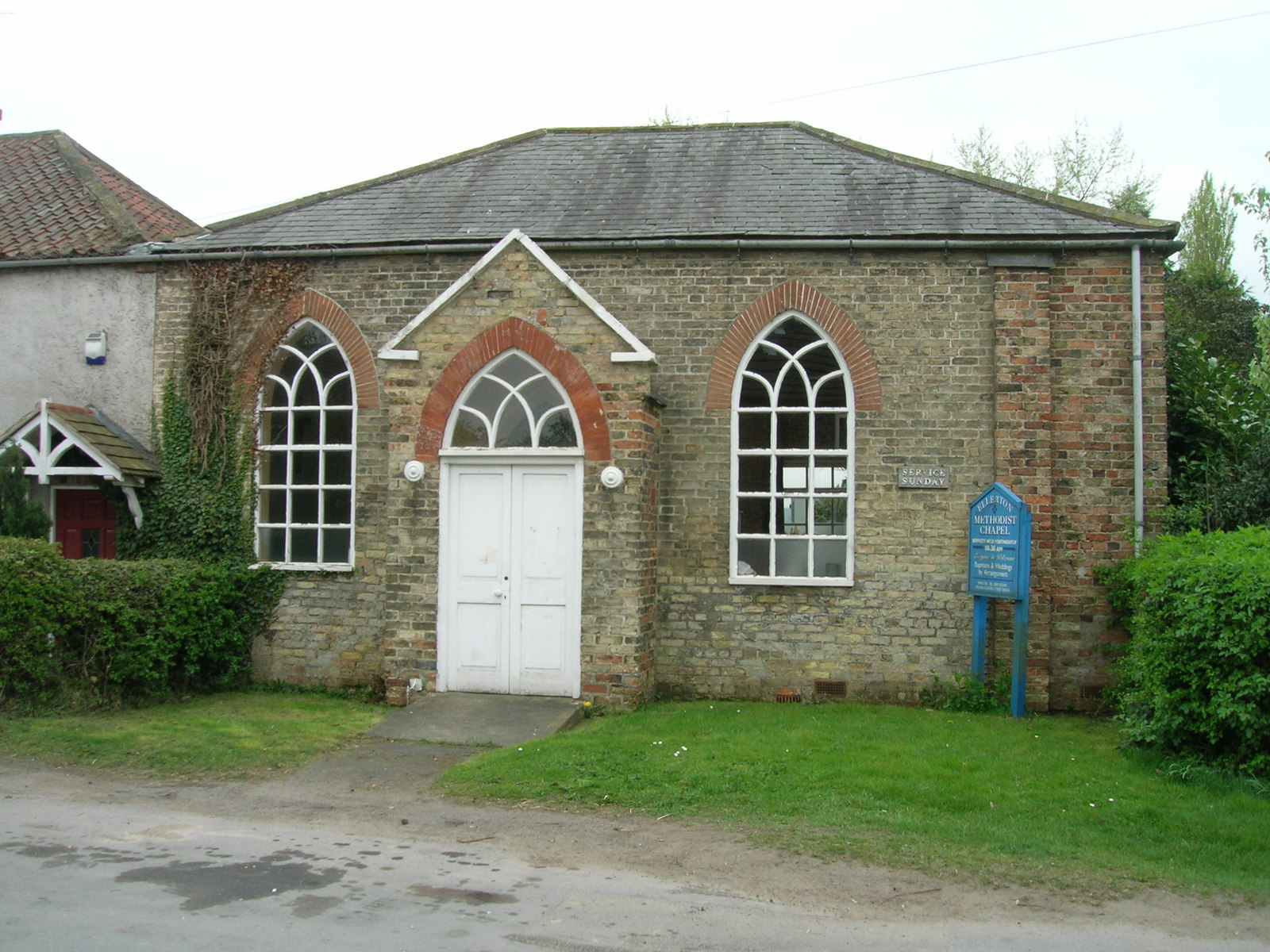
The chapel, in 2011

Ellerton Methodist Chapel is a historic building in Ellerton, East Riding of Yorkshire, a village in England.

The chapel was built in 1811, for the Wesleyan Methodist Church. Later in the century, the building was extended slightly to the west, an additional porch was constructed, and the interior was reordered. By 1851, it could seat 122 worshippers, and typically attracted around 90 across two services each Sunday. Most of the windows were replaced in the 20th century. The building was grade II listed in 1966, and closed for worship in 2017. In 2018, an application was made to upgrade it to grade II* listing in the hope this would compel future owners to preserve its interior; Historic England reappraised the building but did not upgrade it. In 2024, there was a proposal to convert it into a house with some internal features including most of the pews removed.

The chapel is built of yellow brick, with red brick arches and a hipped slate roof. On the front is a porch containing a doorway with a pointed fanlight and an open shouldered pediment. It is flanked by windows with pointed arches; the fanlight and windows contain Gothic tracery. Inside, the original pulpit, communion rail and cupboard survive, along with many of the original pews.

== See also ==
- Listed buildings in Ellerton, East Riding of Yorkshire
