= Albert Tafel =

German geographer, doctor and explorer (1876–1935)

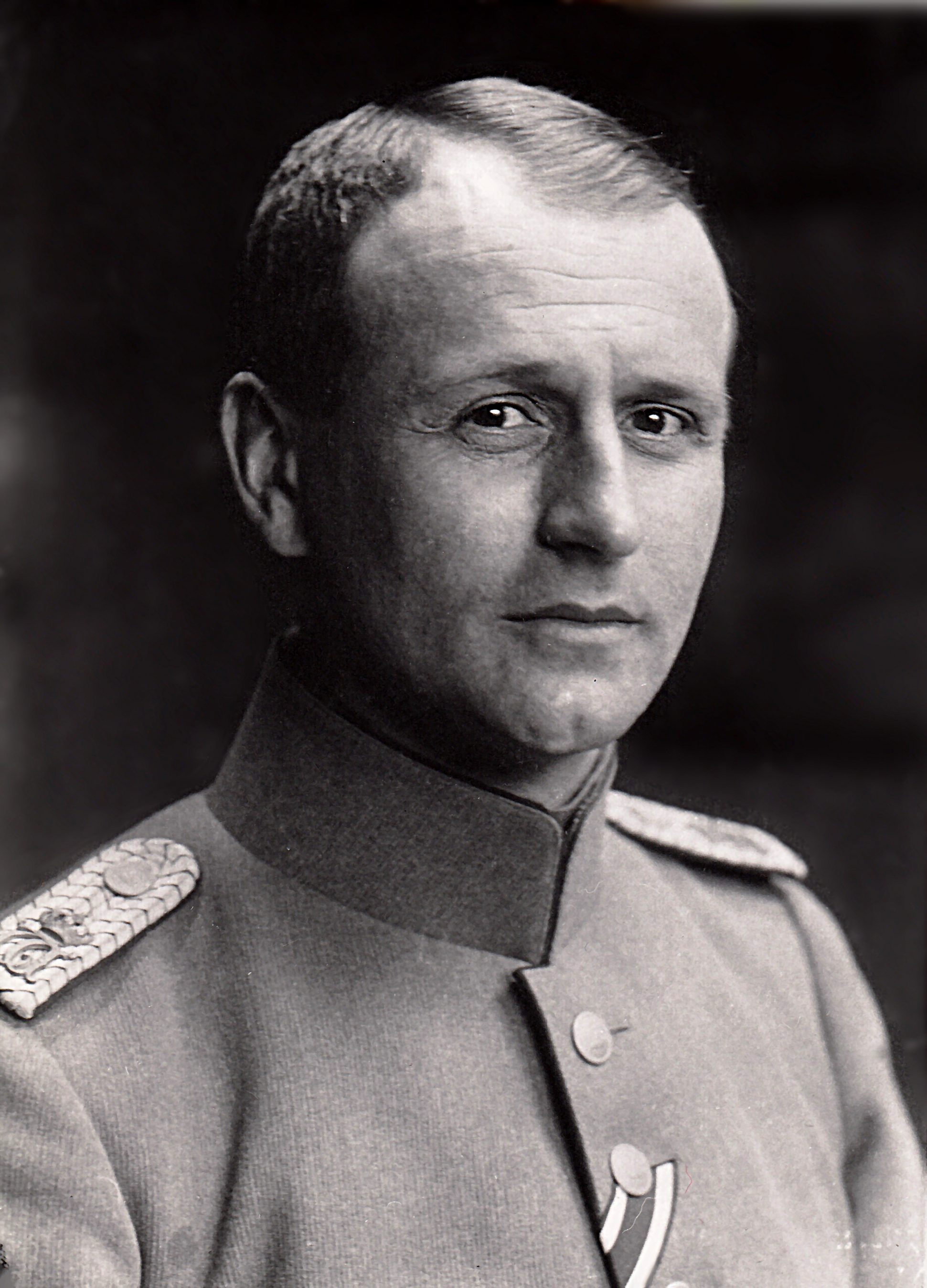
- Tafel in 1916
- Born: 6 November 1876; Stuttgart, Germany
- Died: 19 April 1935; Heidelberg, Germany
- Education: University of Tübingen
- Known for: Expeditions to Tibet
- Scientific career
- Fields: Geography
- Workplaces: University of Karlsruhe

Albert Tafel (6 November 1876 in Stuttgart – 19 April 1935 in Heidelberg) was a German geographer, medical doctor and explorer. Prof. Dr. med. Albert Tafel was the son of Emil Otto Tafel, architect (Oberbaurat) and Professor at the School of Architecture (Baugewerbeschule) in Stuttgart, and his wife Lina, née Reuchlin.

== Biography ==
Following graduation from Dillmann's Modern School he took a journey on foot through the Balkans to Constantinople and Troy. In 1896/7 he served a year in the 26th regiment of the 'yellow dragoons' (gelbe Dragoner) – so called because of their yellow collars and cuffs – in Ludwigsburg. The years 1898–1902 were spent studying medicine in Tübingen, Berlin and Freiburg im Breisgau. Arriving in Tübingen in autumn 1898 he applied to join the student Corps Rhenania and was enrolled the following February. In 1903 he graduated Dr. med. In the course of his studies he travelled to Crete, Albania and Persia, made numerous excursions to the mountains, skiing on the Zugspitze and in the Bernese Oberland on his own home-made skis.

After his final medical exams in 1903, Albert Tafel pursued further courses in geography under Profs. Penk and von Richthofen, subsequently joining Wilhelm Filchner's 1904 expedition to China and Tibet as the party's doctor. It was on this expedition that a severe disagreement arose between the two, which led to a lifelong antipathy, chronicled at length by Filchner in his Feststellungen (publ. 1985). After Filchner's return to Europe, Tafel made further journeys through north China and north-east Tibet, researching in particular the frequently uncertain course of the Yellow River. On his return to Stuttgart in January 1908, he brought back with him extensive geological and ethnological collections as well as his interpreter and Tibetan companion Brdyal Lango.

In August 1909 Albert Tafel married a Jew, Henriette Müller. They lived at first in his parents' house in the Hasenbergsteige in Stuttgart. Brdyal was engaged as a servant. In 1914 he was appointed to a professorship of geography in Karlsruhe, but was unable to take up the post as he was appointed to join the fourth German Turfan Expedition under Albert von Le Coq, the noted archaeologist and explorer of Central Asia in Berlin. His task would be to conduct excavations in the Gobi Desert on behalf of the Kaiser Friedrich Museum in Berlin.

The young couple had moved to Berlin-Charlottenburg where their children were born: Eleonore (Elinor) on 1 July 1910 and Albert Tobias (Toby) on 20 May 1913. Brdyal again moved with them. In Berlin Albert busied himself with drawing out his maps, cataloguing his collections and making preparations for his new journey to the far east, due to start in 1914. This was frustrated by the outbreak of the First World War, and instead he rejoined his regiment of dragoons as Lieutenant.

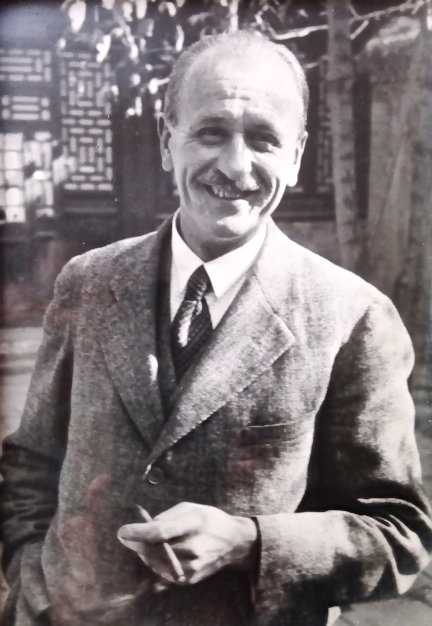
Albert Tafel ca.1930

He was initially deployed on the Western Front in France, then in Romania and subsequently in 1916 with von der Goltz's army in Mesopotamia. In spite of bouts of malaria and blood- poisoning he remained on active service with Arab and Persian auxiliaries against the British Expeditionary Force. After the war the retired cavalry captain, doctor and geographer saw no possibility of retaining the lifestyle to which he had been accustomed before it and so decided to move to the Netherlands Indies as a doctor, working in Batavia and Timor and subsequently as a doctor in the mines of Pulau Laut.

After the sudden death of his wife on 10 April 1928 Albert returned to Stuttgart. His home in Berlin had already been given up before the war. In 1931 he underwent an operation for stomach cancer – The obituary in the newsletter of his student fraternity the Corps Rhenania refers to an operation in Tübingen surgical hospital to remove a 'malignant tumour'. By 1933 however Albert felt well enough to make another trip to China (Tientsin/Tianjin) to prepare for further expeditions to augment his collections. This time he took his children with him: Eleonore (Elinor) and Albert Tobias (Toby) in order to shield them from Hitler's persecution of the Jews.

This occasion gave Albert the opportunity to revisit some of the locations of his earlier travels using more modern means. It was during this period in China that he once more fell ill with a tumour on the liver. At the beginning of 1935 he returned to Germany by ship. Any treatment came too late, and he died on 19 April 1935 in hospital in Heidelberg after a further operation.

== Expeditions ==
Between 1903 and 1908 Tafel undertook several journeys to Asia, particularly in the north of Tibet. He took part among others in Wilhelm Filchner's expedition through north China, and the eastern and north-eastern regions of Tibet, where his principal interest lay in ascertaining the hitherto uncertain course of the Yellow River. In January [1904?] he left the main expedition to seek out the course of several tributaries, as well as the upper reaches of the Yellow River. Thus he explored parts of Inner Mongolia, the province of Kokonor and the Qaidam Basin – a desert region in the north of the Tibetan Plateau in the Chinese province of Qinghai. He explored the Nanshan Mountains and visited the monastery of Kumbum Champa Ling, where he met the thirteenth Dalai Lama, Thubten Gyatsho. On his return in 1908 he brought back a considerable collection of geological and ethnological specimens. The mineral and animal collections are held by the University of Tübingen; the valuable Tibetan ethnological collection is in the care of the Linden Museum in Stuttgart.

== Honours ==
Albert Tafel was awarded the Iron Cross First Class in 1916, and in 1918 the Knight's Cross (Ritterkreuz) of the Military Merit Order (Württemberg)

== Works by Albert Tafel ==
- Meine Tibetreise. Eine Studienfahrt durch das nordwestliche China und durch die innere Mongolei in das östliche Tibet, Union Deutsche Verlagsgesellschaft Stuttgart/Berlin/Leipzig (in German)
- Meine Tibetreise. Eine Studienfahrt durch das nordwestliche China und durch die innere Mongolei in das östliche Tibet, 2nd edition in one volume, 499pp, illustrated, Union Deutsche Verlagsgesellschaft Stuttgart/Berlin/Leipzig (in German)
