= Lerchenfeld Glacier =

Glacier in Antarctica

- Location within Antarctica
- Location: Coats Land
- Coordinates: 77°55′S 34°15′W
- Thickness: unknown
- Terminus: Schweitzer Glacier
- Status: unknown

Lerchenfeld Glacier (German: Lerchenfeldgletscher, 77°55′S 34°15′W) is a glacier flowing in a west-northwesterly direction between Bertrab Nunatak and the Littlewood Nunataks in Antarctica. It coalesces with the southern flank of Schweitzer Glacier before the combined flow discharges into the head of Vahsel Bay.

The glacier was discovered by the Second German Antarctic Expedition, 1911–12, under Wilhelm Filchner, who named this feature for Count Hugo von und zu Lerchenfeld-Köfering, a supporter of the expedition.

== See also ==
- List of glaciers in the Antarctic
- Glaciology
