= Hayes Glacier =

Glacier in Antarctica

- Location within Antarctica
- Location: Coats Land
- Coordinates: 76°16′S 27°54′W
- Length: 17 nmi (31 km; 20 mi)
- Thickness: unknown
- Terminus: Weddell Sea
- Status: unknown

Hayes Glacier in Antarctica enters the southeast part of the Weddell Sea about 17 miles (27 km) west-southwest of Dawson-Lambton Glacier. It was discovered in the course of a U.S. Navy LC-130 plane flight over the Caird Coast on November 5, 1967, and was plotted by the United States Geological Survey from photographs obtained at that time. It was named by the Advisory Committee on Antarctic Names for Lieutenant Commander Winston R. Hayes, U.S. Navy Reserve, the pilot on that flight.

== See also ==
- List of glaciers in the Antarctic
- Glaciology
