= Ellerton Priory (Spalding Moor) =

Priory in Ellerton, East Riding of Yorkshire, England

Coordinates: 53°51′03.5″N 0°56′07.2″W

Ellerton Priory was a Gilbertine priory that was historically in the East Riding of Yorkshire, England. The ruins stand in the village of Ellerton, on Spalding Moor in the East Riding of Yorkshire. The priory was founded no later than 1207, during the reign of King John, by Peter de Goodmanham.

The priory was dissolved in December 1538.

The site of the priory is now a scheduled monument. St Mary's Church, Ellerton lies on the site.
