= Polarstern Canyon =

Undersea canyon off the coast of West Antarctica

Polarstern Canyon (71°30′S 21°0′W) is an undersea canyon named for the German research vessel Polarstern, which took part in 22 expeditions to the Arctic and Antarctic (1982–1995). Name proposed by Dr. Heinrich Hinze, Alfred Wegener Institute for Polar and Marine Research, Bremerhaven, Germany. Name approved 6/97 (ACUF 271).
