= Aughton, East Riding of Yorkshire =

Village in the East Riding of Yorkshire, England

Coordinates: 53.839136°N 0.928960°W

Aughton
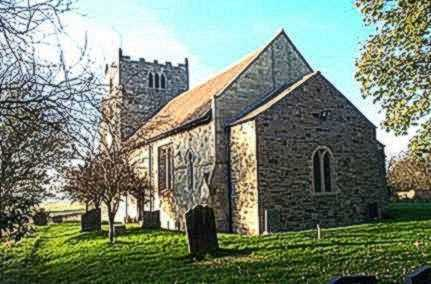
- All Saints Church, Aughton, 2004

- Location within the East Riding of Yorkshire
- OS grid reference: SE705386
  - London: 160 mi (260 km) S
- Civil parish: Ellerton
- Unitary authority: East Riding of Yorkshire
- Ceremonial county: East Riding of Yorkshire
- Region: Yorkshire and the Humber
- Country: England
- Sovereign state: United Kingdom
- Post town: YORK
- Postcode district: YO42
- Dialling code: 01757
- Police: Humberside
- Fire: Humberside
- Ambulance: Yorkshire
- UK Parliament: Goole and Pocklington

Aughton is a village and former civil parish, now in the parish of Ellerton, in the East Riding of Yorkshire, England. It is situated approximately 7 miles (11 km) north-west of the market town of Howden and 9 miles (14 km) south-west of the market town of Pocklington. In 1931 the parish had a population of 100. On 1 April 1935 the parish was abolished to form Ellerton.

It lies west of the B1228 road and east of the River Derwent.

The name Aughton derives from the Old English āctūn meaning the 'settlement at the oak'.

== All Saints Church ==
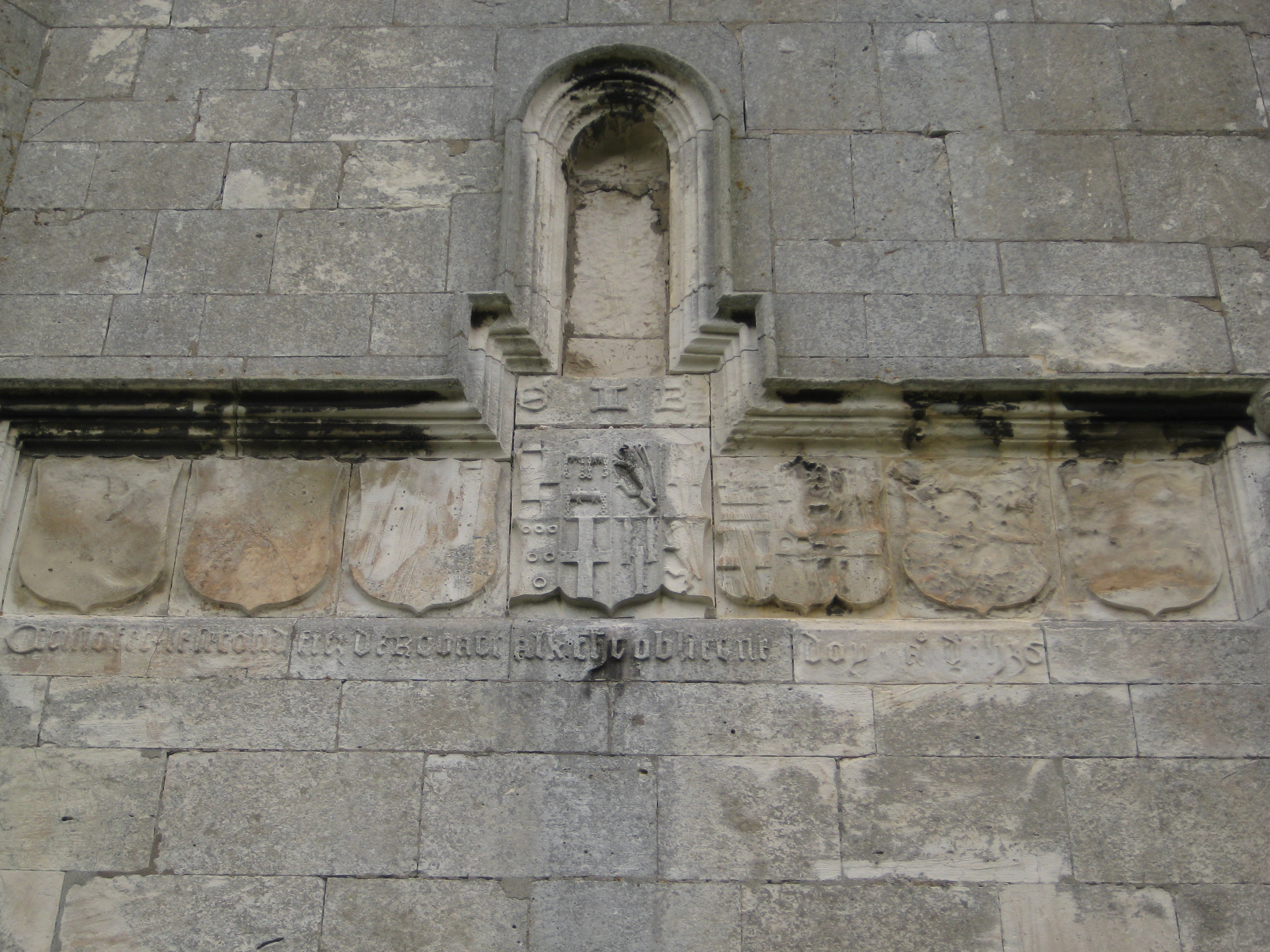
Church tower, 6 quarterlings, 2008

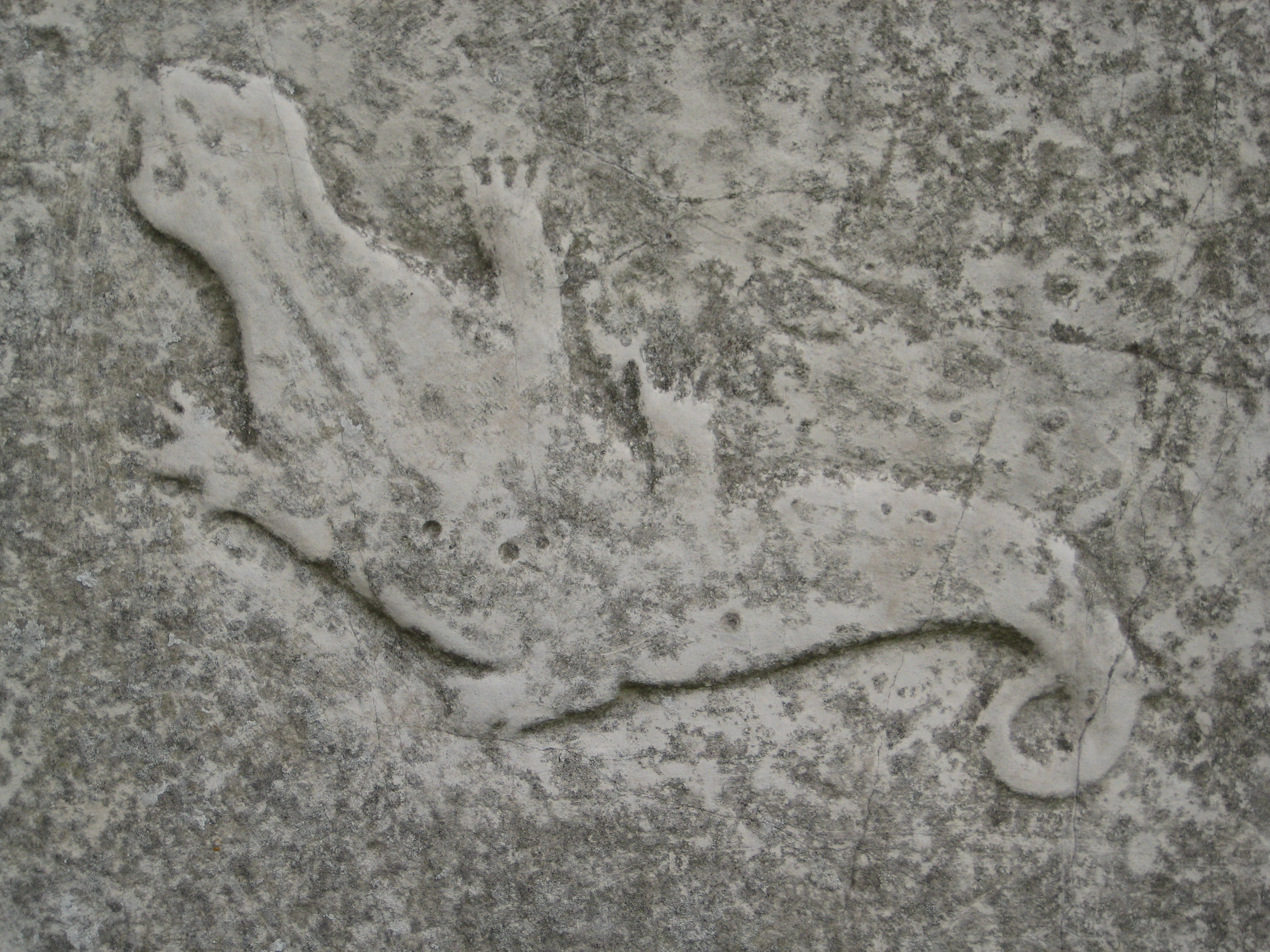
Newt carved in sunk relief, 2008

All Saints Church, Aughton is located at the far end of the village and overlooks vast expanses of the floodplains of the River Derwent. Tucked away in the village, it can only be accessed on foot through a small gate and field adjacent to Aughton Hall. An historic church, famous for its association with Robert Aske, leader of the insurgents in the Pilgrimage of Grace, October 1536. Aske was executed for treason on 12 July 1537. The church displays a mixture of architectural designs as it has been altered throughout the years, but is noted especially for its Norman arch between the chancel and nave. On the chancel floor a well-preserved ancient brass of a knight in 15th century plate armour and his lady can be found, although much of the lady is now missing. Standing in the churchyard and looking up at the tower, (which was rebuilt by Christopher Aske sometime after 1536), a shield with six quarterings can be seen engraved on the outside wall, now badly weathered but it offers the following inscription in old French text: "Christofer le second filz de Robert Ask chr oblier ne doy, Ao Di 1536." This is literally translated as: "Christopher, the second son of Robert Aske, chevalier, ought not to forget the year of our Lord 1536." Also on the tower is a benchmark of the time and carved, in sunk relief, a newt or salamander otherwise known in Old English as an Ask.

The church was designated in 1966 as a Grade I listed building and is now recorded in the National Heritage List for England, maintained by Historic England.

To the north of the church are the surviving earthworks, now restored, of a motte-and-bailey castle, that has been scheduled under the Ancient Monuments and Archaeological Areas Act 1979 as an ancient monument.

== See also ==
- Listed buildings in Ellerton, East Riding of Yorkshire
