= William Lenton =

Australian rugby league footballer

William Lenton was a professional rugby league footballer in the Australian competition the New South Wales Rugby League (NSWRL).

Lenton played for the Eastern Suburbs club in the 1909 season. A winger, Lenton was a try scorer in that year's semi-final loss against the Balmain Tigers.
