= Francis Lenton =

English poet (fl. 1629–1653)

Francis Lenton (fl. 1629–1653) was an English poet best known for his work in the court of Henrietta Maria. He was given the honorary title of Queen's Poet.

Lenton's life outside of his work is one of historical uncertainty. When and where he was born is debated, as is his death. It was once assumed that Lenton died on May 12, 1642, based upon a preserved obituary found at Staunton Hall, Leicestershire. However, a copy of his work "Queene Esters Haliluiahs and Hamans Madrigalls Expressed and Illustrated in a Sacred Poeme" from 1649 is signed "Your Excellencyes most reall and devoted Honouror: Francis Lenton" suggesting he lived beyond this date.

== Notable works ==
- The Young Gallants Whirligigg (1629)
- Characterismi, or, Lentons Leasures (1631)
- The Innes of Court Anagrammatist, or, The Masquers Masque in Anagrammes (1634)
- Queene Esters Haliluiahs and Hamans Madrigalls Expressed and Illustrated in a Sacred Poeme (1637)
- Great Britains Beauties, or, The Female Glory (1638)
- The Muses Oblation (1641)
