= Dawson-Lambton Glacier =

Glacier of Antarctica

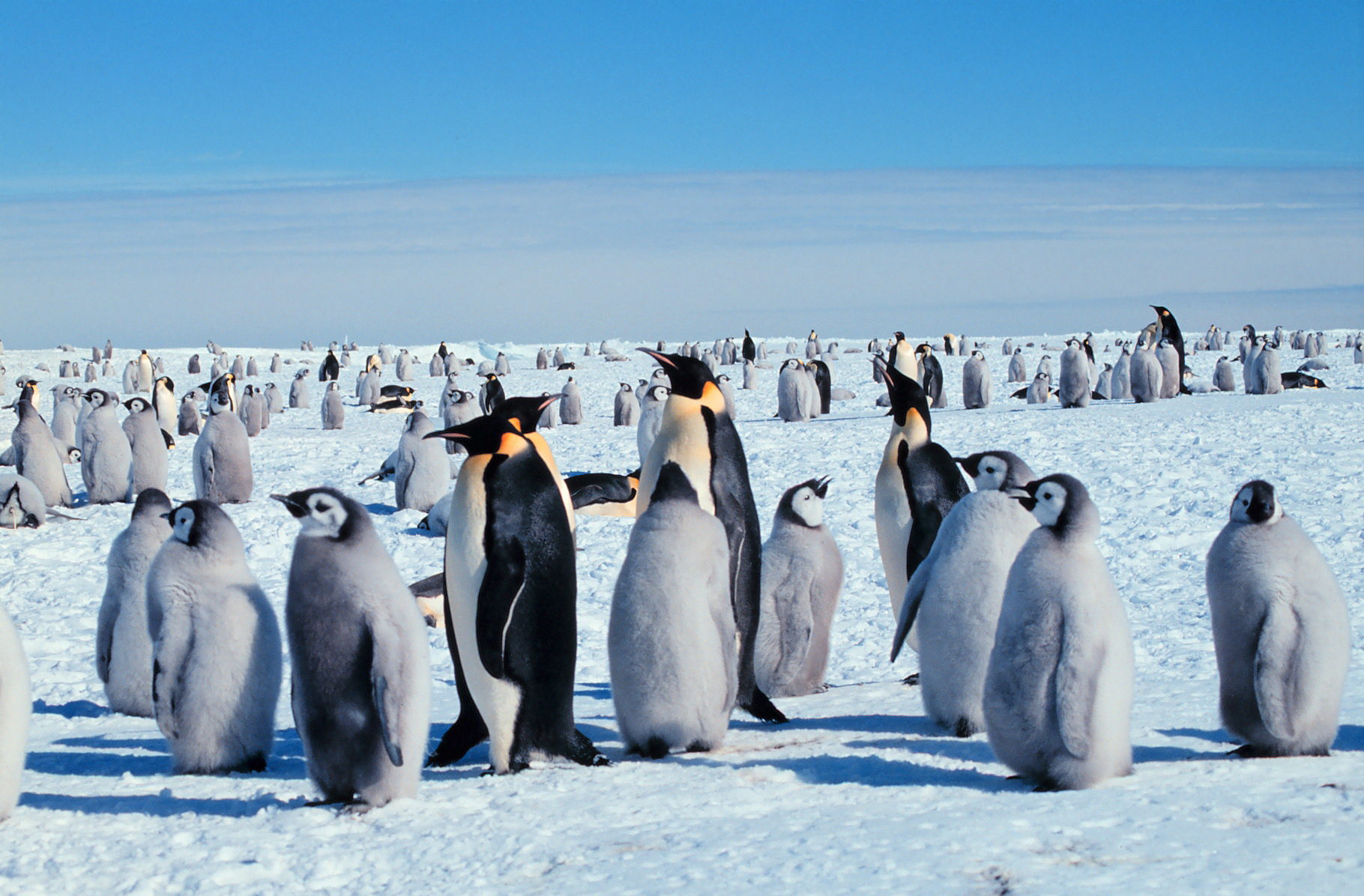
- Emperor penguins breed in the IBA

- Location within Antarctica
- Location: Coats Land
- Coordinates: 76°8′S 26°45′W
- Thickness: unknown
- Terminus: Weddell Sea
- Status: unknown

The Dawson-Lambton Glacier is a heavily crevassed glacier entering the south-eastern Weddell Sea immediately west of the Brunt Ice Shelf. It was discovered in January 1915 by a British expedition led by Ernest Shackleton. He named it for Elizabeth Dawson-Lambton, a benefactress of the Shackleton expeditions.

== Important Bird Area ==
A 500 ha site on fast ice that forms in the Weddell Sea near the Dawson-Lambton Glacier has been designated an Important Bird Area (IBA) by BirdLife International because it supports a breeding colony of emperor penguins, with an estimate of some 2,600 individuals based on 2009 satellite imagery.

=== Beak deformity issues ===
Along with the emperor penguin colony, it was discovered have multiple examples of beak deformity in the baby chicks that have been noted by FST (fixation index). The chicks that have been investigated with these deformations in their beaks have been proved to be in good health, since they could be still fed. However, this could be a problem when the chicks grow up and need to catch their own food in the ocean with their beaks.

Pütz & Plötz (1991) reviewed the beak deformities on the baby penguins, and note that it is common for domesticated birds to experience this, but it's uncommon to be noted in the wild. These deformities could be formed due to 'congenital defects, deficiency diseases, parasitic infections, injuries, or unusual feeding of the chick.'

Very few of the known Emperor penguin colonies have been visited by examiners, which is why the conclusion that has been brought up is that this may be a normal amount of deformations that are devolved by this species.

== See also ==
- List of glaciers in the Antarctic
- Dawson-Lambton Trough
- Glaciology
