= Ellenton =

Ellenton may refer to:

- Ellenton, Florida
- Ellenton, Georgia
- Ellenton, South Carolina
