= Luitpold Coast =

Coastal region of Antarctica

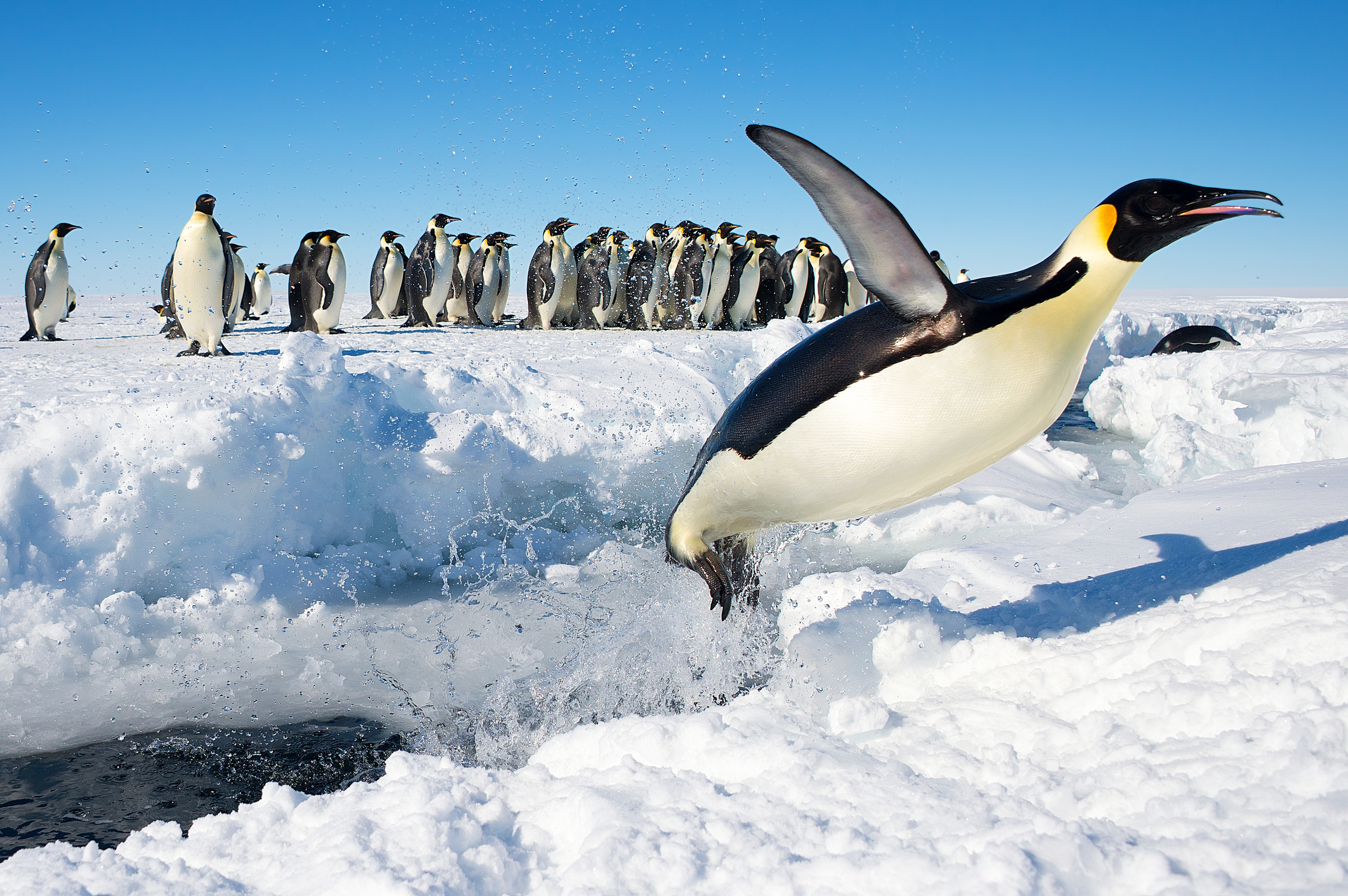
Emperor penguins breed in the IBA

Location of Luitpold Coast
Antarctica

Luitpold Coast (German: Prinzregent-Luitpold-Land) is the portion of the coast of Coats Land extending from the vicinity of Hayes Glacier, at 27°54′W, to 36°W, which is regarded as the eastern limit of the Filchner Ice Shelf. It was discovered by Wilhelm Filchner, leader of the Second German Antarctic Expedition, 1911–12, and named after Luitpold, Prince Regent of Bavaria.

== Important Bird Area ==
A 500 ha site on fast ice some 50 km north-east of the Filchner Ice Shelf, where icebergs regularly calve from the continental margin, has also been designated an Important Bird Area (IBA) by BirdLife International because it supports a breeding colony of about 6,500 emperor penguins, an estimate based on 2009 satellite imagery.

== Virgen de las Nieves Refuge ==
Virgen de las Nieves Refuge (79°10′00″S 38°53′00″W) is an Argentine Antarctic refuge located on the Filchner-Ronne Ice Shelf on the Luitpold Coast 150 kilometres south of the Belgrano I Base. The refuge is administered by the Argentine Army and was opened on 2 December 1958 and is under the base Belgrano II.

The refuge was built in the Argentine Antarctic campaign of 1958–1959 under the supervision of Lieutenant Colonel Jorge De Marzi and Major Pedro Arcondo. At the time, it was the southernmost Antarctic refuge of Argentina, more to the south of Refuge Santa Bárbara and the old Sobral Base. The name of the refuge refers to Our Lady of the Snows.

== See also ==
- List of Antarctic field camps
