= Ellerton, East Riding of Yorkshire =

Village in the East Riding of Yorkshire, England

Coordinates: 53°51′00″N 0°55′42″W

Ellerton
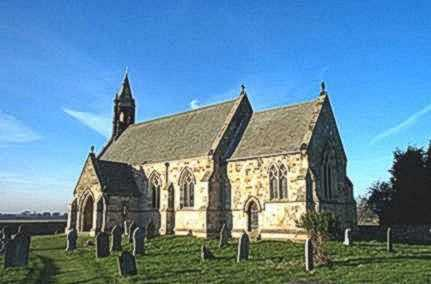
- St Mary's Church, Ellerton, 2004

- Location within the East Riding of Yorkshire
- Population: 388 (2011 census)
- OS grid reference: SE704398
  - London: 165 mi (266 km) S
- Civil parish: Ellerton
- Unitary authority: East Riding of Yorkshire
- Ceremonial county: East Riding of Yorkshire
- Region: Yorkshire and the Humber
- Country: England
- Sovereign state: United Kingdom
- Post town: YORK
- Postcode district: YO42
- Dialling code: 01757
- Police: Humberside
- Fire: Humberside
- Ambulance: Yorkshire
- UK Parliament: Goole and Pocklington

Ellerton is a village and civil parish in the East Riding of Yorkshire, England. It is situated approximately 8 miles (13 km) north-west of the market town of Howden and 8 miles south-west of the market town of Pocklington. It lies west of the B1228 road and east of the River Derwent. According to the 2011 UK census, the parish had a population of 388, an increase on the 2001 UK census figure of 355. and covers an area of 1,824.551 hectares (4,508.56 acres).

== Civil parish ==
The parish includes Aughton. In 1935 the civil parishes of Ellerton Priory and Aughton were abolished and merged into Ellerton. Although the civil parish is called "Ellerton" its parish council is called "Ellerton & Aughton Parish Council".

== History ==
The name Ellerton derives from the Old Norse elri meaning 'alder tree' and the Old English tūn meaning 'settlement'.

A priory of canons of the Gilbertine Order existed at Ellerton, which was known as Ellerton Priory. The priory was founded before 1212, and relinquished on 11 December 1536 under the suppression of the monasteries. The site of the priory is now a scheduled monument.

In 1823 Ellerton, was in the Wapentake of Harthill, and contained Ellerton Methodist Chapel and a chapel dedicated to St Mary. The village had a population of 318, with occupations including ten farmers, a corn miller, a tailor, and a shopkeeper. A shoemaker was also a licensed victualler of The Board public house. Also directory-listed was a school master, a gentleman and a vicar. Once a week a carrier operated between the village and York.

The deconsecrated St Mary's Church, Ellerton, by architect John Loughborough Pearson, was designated a Grade II listed building in December 1966 and is now recorded in the National Heritage List for England, maintained by Historic England.

== See also ==
- Listed buildings in Ellerton, East Riding of Yorkshire
