= Wilhelm Filchner =

German explorer (1877–1957)

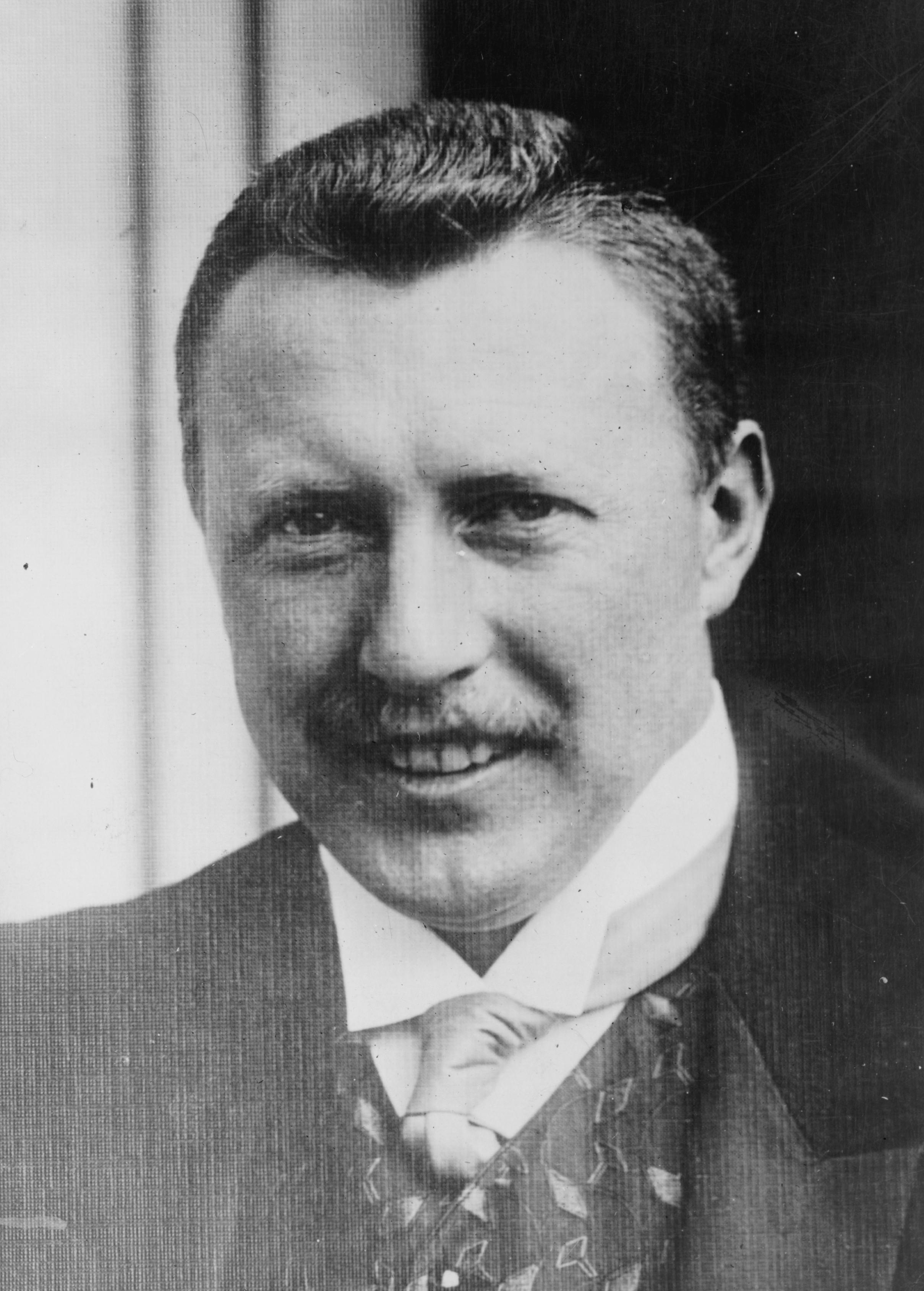
- Wilhelm Filchner in the early 1910s
- Born: 13 September 1877; Munich, Germany
- Died: 7 May 1957 (aged 79); Zürich
- Citizenship: Germany
- Education: Prussian Military Academy, Technical University of Munich
- Occupations: Army officer, scientist, explorer
- Parent(s): Eduard and Rosine Filchner

Wilhelm Filchner (13 September 1877 – 7 May 1957) was a German army officer, scientist and explorer. He conducted several surveys and scientific investigations in China, Tibet and surrounding regions, and led the Second German Antarctic Expedition, 1911–1913.

As a young military officer, Filchner gained an early reputation for dash and daring, following his travel exploits in Russia and the Pamir Mountains range. After further technical studies, he developed expertise in geography and geophysics, before leading a major scientific survey in Tibet and western China in 1903–1905. In 1909 he was appointed to organise and lead the forthcoming German expedition to the Antarctic, with both scientific and geographical objectives involving extensive exploration of the continent's interior. During the expedition his ship became trapped in the Weddell Sea ice, drifting for eight months and preventing Filchner from establishing a land base, thus failing in its main objective. Although important scientific results were obtained, the expedition was disrupted by serious interpersonal disagreements and lasting animosities, which harmed Filchner's reputation as a leader and ended his polar career.

After service in the First World War he resumed his travels in Asia. He conducted two lengthy single-handed magnetic surveys in China and Tibet, often in difficult and sometimes dangerous conditions, and was continuing this work when the Second World War began, leaving him stranded in India. After years of internment, he returned to Europe and retired to Zürich, where he died in 1957. During his lifetime he received numerous honours, including the German National Prize for Art and Science in 1937, and several honorary doctorates. He is also commemorated in the Antarctic, where a number of geographical features bear his name.

== Early life ==
Wilhelm Filchner was born on 13 September 1877, the son of Eduard and Rosine Filchner. Sources place his birth variously at Munich or Bayreuth; it appears that the family moved from Munich to Bayreuth shortly after Wilhelm's birth, but returned to Munich after his father's early death. As a boy, Wilhelm showed considerable artistic and musical talent, drawing inspiration from, amongst others, Franz von Lenbach, Franz Stuck, and Siegfried Wagner. He might have made his life in the arts, but family traditions drew him towards a military career, and at the age of 15 he was enrolled in the Prussian Military Academy.

== Traveller and explorer ==
=== Early travels in Asia ===
==== Russia and the Pamirs ====
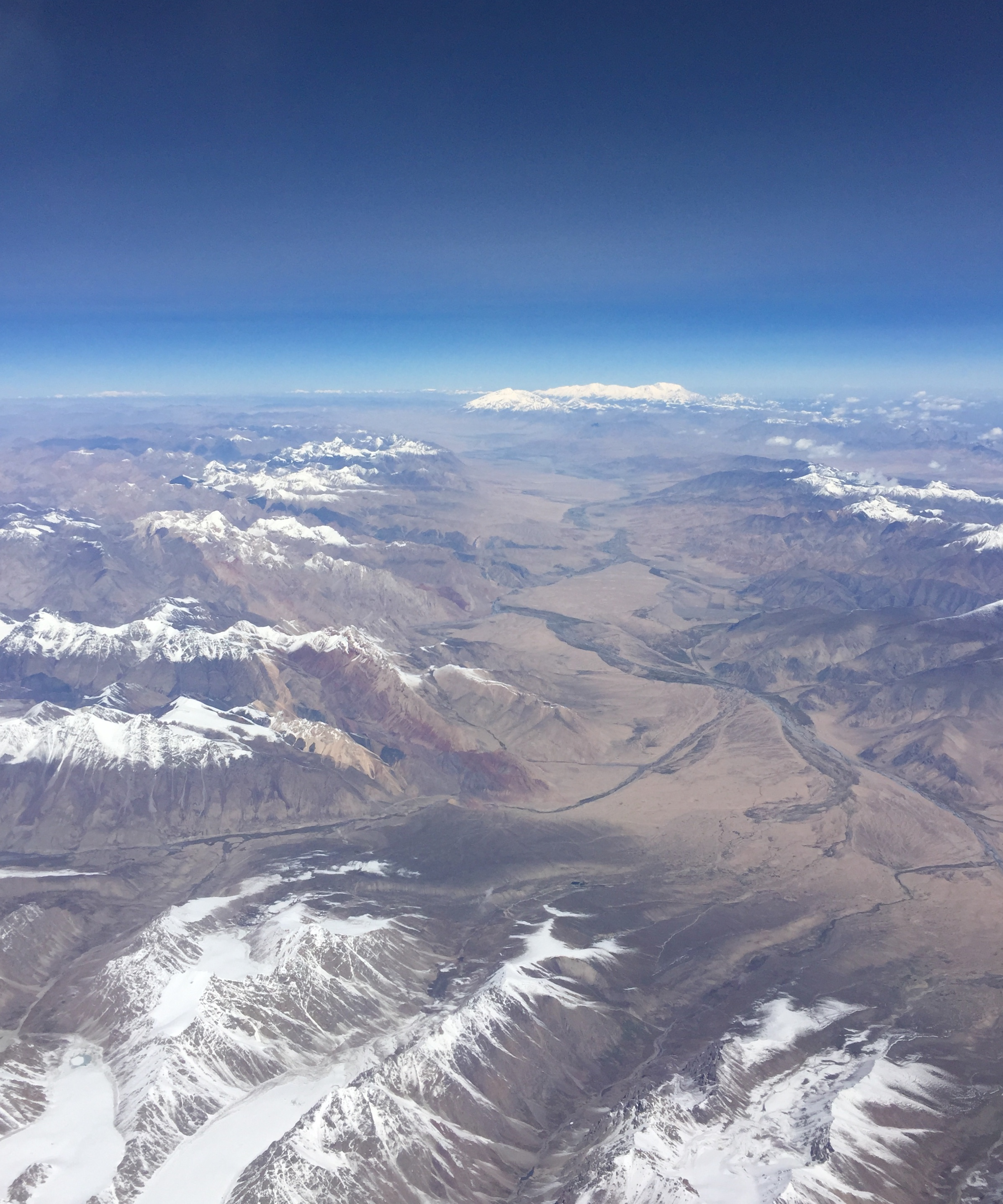
Aerial view of Pamir Mountains

As a young officer in 1898, Filchner was given leave from the army to undertake a seven-week journey in Russia, but had to leave that country when he was suspected of acting as a spy. Two years later he made an expedition to the Pamir Mountains, which included a well-publicised horseback ride, travelling from Osh in the Fergana Valley to Murghab in Tajikistan, and returning by way of Kashgar in Sinkiang. During these travels, Filchner observed much Russian activity and noted the differences between the Russians and the English in their interactions with the indigenous people: "The Russians manage, in their dealings with Asiatic peoples, to reach out to their hearts, whereas the English, in their relations with natives, make a show of their cultural superiority". Through these adventures, which he recounted in a popular book, Ein Ritt über den Pamir ("A Ride over the Pamirs"), Filchner gained an early reputation as a daring traveller.

==== China and Tibet, 1903–05 ====
Back in Germany, Filcher developed his knowledge of geography and geophysics through courses at the Technical University of Munich and other institutions. Between 1900 and 1903, he formed contacts with some of the leading travelling scientists of the day, including the Swede Sven Hedin, and Ferdinand von Richthofen from the University of Berlin. In 1903, with von Richthofen's recommendation, the army gave him leave to assume the leadership of a major scientific survey in Tibet and western China, extending to the upper reaches of the Hwang Ho river. This was a potentially dangerous enterprise, and Filchner found it necessary at times to conceal his activities by disguising himself as a Muslim priest.

Filchner's principal scientific assistant on this journey was the geographer Albert Tafel, with whom relations were difficult and often strained. After the journey, Tafel missed few opportunities for insulting Filchner and undermining his authority as a leader, accusing him of cowardice and questioning the accuracy of his maps. Filchner's military background and formal manner contributed to the problem; as Cornelia Lüdecke puts it in a biographical essay on Filchner, as an officer he was "trained to command and not to discuss". This was a trait that would also be apparent in Filchner's later expeditions.

=== Antarctic: Second German Antarctic Expedition, 1911–13 ===
==== Background, objectives and preparations ====
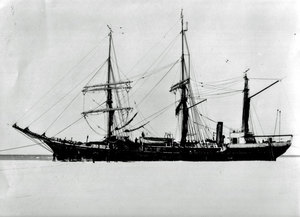
Expedition ship, Deutschland

Filchner's interest in the Antarctic was sparked by the theories of Albrecht Penck of the University of Berlin, who considered that the then largely unexplored Antarctic continent comprised two separate landmasses, East and West Antarctica, divided by a strait connecting the Weddell and Ross Seas. Filchner wished to investigate this question, and in 1909, with the support of the Berlin Geographical Society, began preparations for an Antarctic expedition. He would not only test Penck's theory, but would combine geographical discovery with scientific inquiry. Filchner's original plan envisaged two ships, with shore parties advancing inland respectively from Weddell and Ross Sea bases, to meet in the vicinity of the Pole. This proved too costly, so Filchner had to adopt a more modest, single-ship strategy, confining his operations to the Weddell Sea area.

A ship, the Norwegian whaler Bjorn was acquired, and her name changed to Deutschland. Her captain was to be a naval officer, Richard Vahsel, who had previous Antarctic experience, but was by reputation a somewhat difficult and truculent character, "greedy for power and an out-and-out schemer". Unwisely, Filchner agreed to sail under the German naval flag, placing Deutschland and himself under naval regulations that gave the captain supreme decision-making authority on the ship. This created a situation of divided command, with serious consequences for Filchner's authority on the expedition.

==== Expedition ====
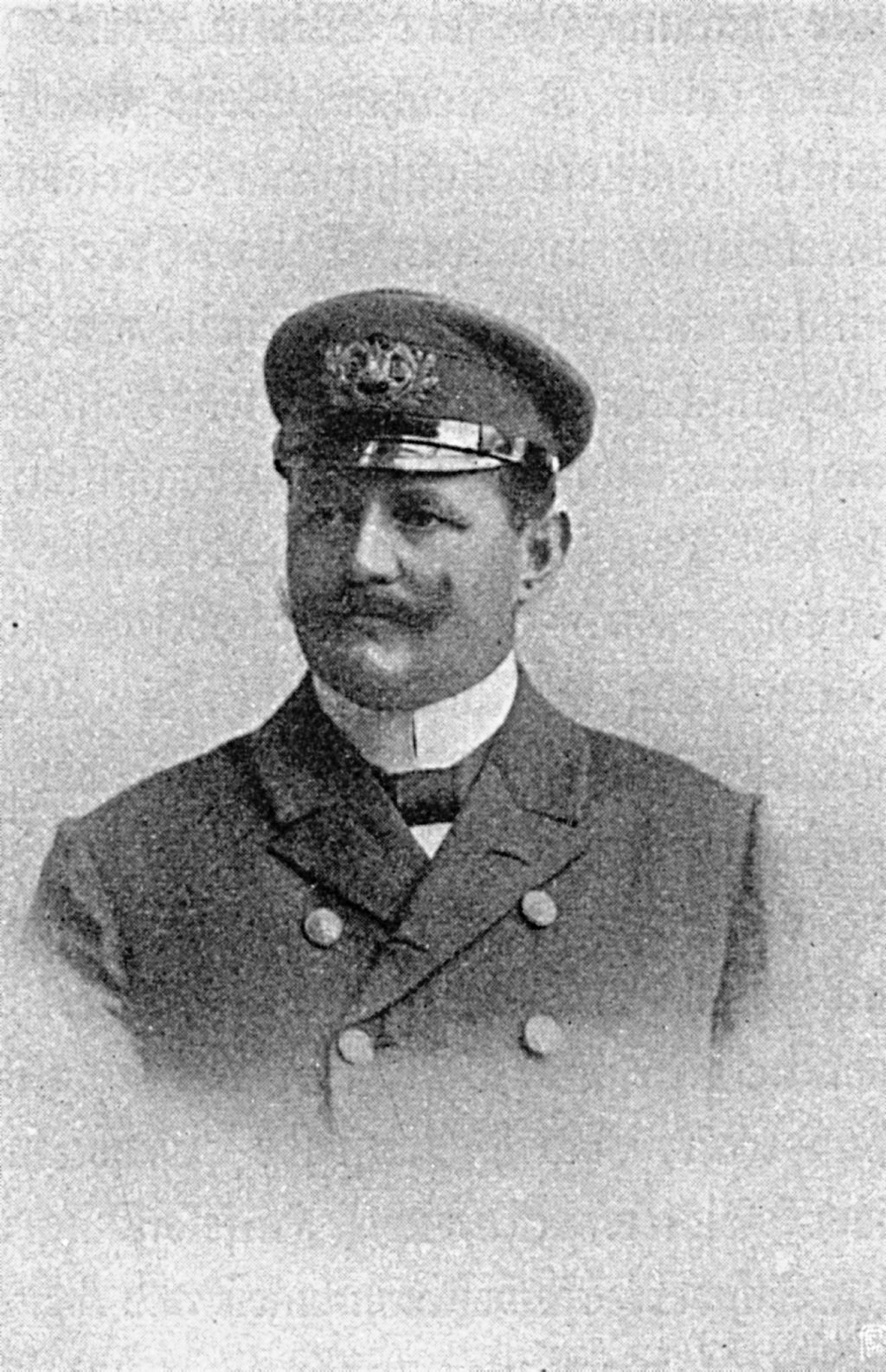
Captain Richard Vahsel of the Deutschland

Deutschland sailed from Bremerhaven in early May 1911. The first stage involved a comprehensive oceanographic study of the Atlantic, covering more than 10,000 nautical miles (12,000 mi; 19,000 km) and extending over four months. After a break in Buenos Aires, the expedition departed for South Georgia, arriving late in October. While the ship was reprovisioned, Filchner conducted a survey of the island's coasts. On 11 December 1911 the heavily laden Deutschland began its journey south, to the Weddell Sea.

From the outset, progress was slow and uncertain. Brief periods of clear water were interspersed with spells of thick ice that impeded and sometimes prevented movement. However, by 29 January Deutschland had penetrated the Weddell Sea beyond James Weddell's most southerly point, reached in 1823, and the next day observed an ice-covered coast to the east. Filcher named this "Prinzregent Luitpold Land" (or "Luitpold Coast"), after the expedition's principal patron. Following the coastline, on 31 January, at 77°48'S, Deutschland reached a vast ice barrier, marking the southernmost extent of the Weddell Sea.

After much prevarication from the captain, Filchner agreed to establish his shore base in a small inlet which he christened Vahsel Bay. The site chosen by the captain was a berg attached to the barrier edge; Filchner was dubious, but Vahsel assured him that his ice pilot, Paul Björvik, had approved the site; Björvik would later deny giving any such advice. By 18 February building was nearly complete, but that night a violent tidal surge detached the berg containing the base and it floated away. A desperate salvage exercise saved all the personnel and most of the equipment and provisions, though some items were lost. Thereafter, Filchner tried for several more days to re-establish the base, but these efforts proved unavailing.

==== Drift ====
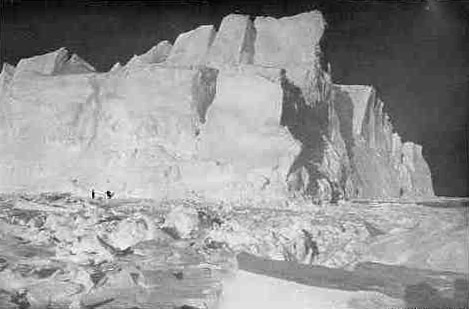
Weddell sea ice, 1916

Deutschland began its return journey, intending to try again the following season. By 15 March, the ship was firmly beset in the ice, drifting slowly northwards, and clearly trapped for the winter. By this time the expedition's morale had largely collapsed as a result of the Vahsel Bay fiasco; the party had broken into factions, and hostility, recrimination and drunkenness, with threats of violence, became the norms. Nevertheless, Filchner still sought to continue the scientific work, in stations set up on the ice. On 10 August Vahsel died (of heart failure likely aggravated by the effects of syphilis) but the poisonous atmosphere continued under his replacement, first officer Wilhelm Lorenzen. The ship was not freed until 26 November 1912, and when she finally arrived in South Georgia on 19 December, the expedition disintegrated. The opposing factions were kept apart before being transferred back to Germany separately. Filchner hoped that the expedition could be reconstituted for another attempt, but his backers in Germany summoned him home.

In Germany a Court of Honour largely exonerated Filchner from blame for the debacle, but the experience had wearied him of the Antarctic, and he never returned. Instead, he decided he would resume his original field of work, in Central and East Asia.

=== Post First World War ===
During the First World War, Filchner served in the German army, mainly in military intelligence; in 1916 he was director of the marine interrogation service in Bergen, Norway. In the years immediately following the war he devoted himself to writing. In 1922 he published his account of the Antarctic expedition, Zum sechsten Erdteil: Die zweite deutsche Südpolar-Expedition ("To the Sixth Continent: The Second German South Polar Expedition"). In this book Filchner barely mentions the interpersonal difficulties that marred and ultimately overwhelmed the expedition, instead producing a relatively straightforward account of its activities and achievements. In the absence of rebuttal, criticisms from his enemies citing his lack of leadership and deficient exploring ability would continue, unanswered, for decades. In 1924 Filchner published a book, Sturm über Asien: Erlebnisse eines diplomatischen Geheimagenten ("Storm over Asia: Experiences of a Secret Diplomatic Agent"), covering the history of Central Asia since the beginning of the 20th century. This is not an account of personal experiences; it is a semi-fictionalised life of Zerempil, a Buryat monk from Urga. Filchner reissued the book in revised form in 1928, under the title Wetterleuchten im Osten ("Weather Lights in the East").

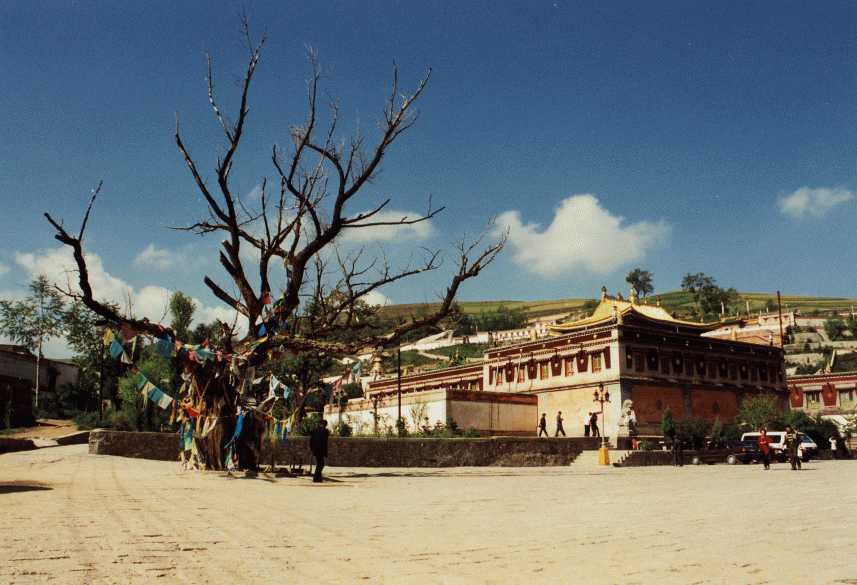
Kumbum Monastery

==== Central Asian survey, 1926–28 ====
In 1926, Filchner resumed his prewar survey and observational work in Central Asia. Assisted by a small grant from the German Foreign Office, he set out in January of that year. After many delays and obstructions, he reached the Kumbum Monastery on the China–Tibetan border, where he spent the winter of 1926–27 in conditions of ill-health and poverty, while awaiting further funds and permission to proceed. In April 1927 he received letters of commendation allowing him to travel into Tibet, and in June he set out, his destination being the Northern Indian town of Leh. Despite further privations and hold-ups, he reached Leh on 5 March 1928, before completing his journey at Dehradun. His programme of work for the journey included the first major contribution to the magnetic survey of northern Tibet. He made many topographical measurements and produced detailed maps which transformed geographical knowledge of this region. To this information he added what he termed "cultural-political observations". Much of his work was carried out in secret, to avoid the attention of suspicious authorities. The journey became the subject of a film, Mönche, Tänzer und Soldaten ("Monks, Dancers and Soldiers"), a valuable documentary of monastic and other life of that time.

==== Second Asian survey, 1934–37 ====
In the years 1934 to 1938, Filchner returned to the same region, this time following a route across northern Tibet from Lanzhou to Leh. Whereas on the earlier journey he had largely paid his own way, this time the costs of the expedition were met by the German government. Filchner was required to link his new measurements with those of the earlier journey. There may have been national and commercial dimensions to this second trip; the airline Deutsche Luft Hansa was planning to extend its services in the region. To navigate successfully, pilots would require accurate magnetic data in an area largely devoid of the natural geographical features that would enable navigation by sight. It is possible that Filchner was paid by the airline for this purpose.

In the course of his travels, Filchner crossed the Gobi and Taklamakan deserts, and arrived at Hotan in Xinjiang in December 1936. It was unsafe territory, with a civil war raging. Filcher did not possess the necessary papers; he was arrested and his passport confiscated. He was detained by the warlord Ma Hushan, in harsh conditions for seven months, before his passport was returned and he was allowed to proceed. He then had to navigate the so-called "route of death" over the Karakoram range. He arrived in Leh in September 1937, finishing his 3,500 km (2,175 miles) journey a month later in Srinigar. On his return, he learned that Adolf Hitler had awarded him the German National Prize for Art and Science. Filchner described this expedition in his book Bismillah (1938), translated into English as A Scientist in Tartary: From the Hoang-ho to the Indus (1939).

== Second World War, retirement, death ==
In 1939 he planned to travel to Afghanistan and Northern Iran, to carry out magnetic work there, but decided instead to go to Nepal. He conducted magnetic surveys in the western and south-eastern regions of the country, although the British in India were suspicious of his presence there. When the Second World War broke out in September 1939, Filchner decided to remain in Nepal, but in December 1940 his health failed, requiring him to seek medical treatment in India, where he was promptly interned. The circumstances of his confinement in India were not harsh, and he was allowed to continue working and to travel to a limited extent. When the war ended, he lived in Poona before returning to Europe in 1949, settling in the Swiss city of Zürich. In Zürich he maintained his academic interests through contacts at ETH Zürich and the German Geodetic Commission at Munich. In 1956 he broke his long silence concerning the events of the Antarctic expedition, and prepared an exposé, Feststellungen ("Findings"), a response to his long-time critics. This revealed for the first time details of the expedition's travails, but at Filchner's insistence, remained unpublished until 1985. Filchner continued to live in Zurich until his death, on 7 May 1957, at the age of 79.

== Assessment ==
Despite his outward formality of manner, Filchner demonstrated an imaginative and adventurous approach in the planning and execution of his various expeditions. In the course of his journeys he made important and lasting contributions to the cartography and magnetic measurements of Central Asia, and his Antarctic expedition, despite its circumstances, produced significant scientific and geographical results. Filchner's background and military training had instilled a somewhat inflexible attitude, not conducive to successful teamwork, and created difficulties with interpersonal relationships. These were exemplified by his falling-out with Tafel, and by his poor handling of the situation of divided command that arose on the Deutschland. Murphy describes Filchner as "a bit stiff, something of a cold fish", and lacking the sense of humour and common touch which marked leaders such as Shackleton. Lüdecke points out the marked successes of his later expeditions, which gained lavish praise from the Royal Geographical Society, when he worked alone without the constraint of maintaining a collegial approach.

Filchner's work was recognised in 1937 by his award of the German National Prize. He received honorary doctorates from the University of Königsberg (1911) and the Technical University of Munich (1938), and was appointed to an honorary professorship at the University of Berlin. He is commemorated in the various Antarctic features that bear his name: the Filchner Rocks in South Georgia; the Filchner Mountains in Queen Maud Land; Cape Filchner; the Filchner Trench in the Weddell Sea; and the Filchner–Ronne Ice Shelf. The Filchner Station operated as a German scientific base on Berkner Island between 1982 and 1999.

== Publications ==
As well as many volumes of scientific results and books of maps, derived from his various travels, Filchner published popular travel books and expedition accounts. These works included A Scientist in Tartary: from the Hoang Ho to the Indus (English translation 1939); a memoir, Ein Forscherleben ("A Researcher's Life") (1950); and, with Erich Przybyllok, Route-mapping and position-locating in unexplored regions (English translation 1957). An English translation by William Barr of Filchner's 1922 account of the 1911–1913 Antarctic expedition, To the Sixth Continent, together with the 1985 exposé, was published in 1994.

== See also ==
- Heroic Age of Antarctic Exploration
