= Coats Land =

Region of Antarctica

Coordinates: 77°00′S 27°30′W

Location of Coats Land in Antarctica

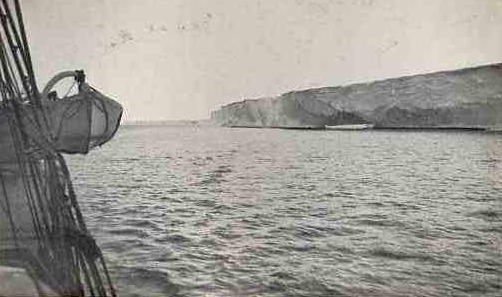
The sheer ice cliffs of the Caird Coast as seen by Shackleton's Expedition in January 1915

Coats Land is a region in Antarctica which lies westward of Queen Maud Land and forms the eastern shore of the Weddell Sea, extending in a general northeast–southwest direction between 20°00′W and 36°00′W. The northeast part was discovered from the Scotia by William Speirs Bruce, leader of the Scottish National Antarctic Expedition, 1902–1904. He gave the name Coats Land for James Coats, Jr., and Major Andrew Coats, the two chief supporters of the expedition.

== Research stations ==
Belgrano II Base (Argentina)

== Countries claiming Coats Land ==
The eastern part of Coats Land is claimed by Norway and is part of Queen Maud Land, the central part being claimed by the United Kingdom and is part of the British Antarctic Territory, and the western part is claimed by Argentina and is part of Argentine Antarctica.

== See also ==
- Luitpold Coast
- Polarstern Canyon
