= Theron Mountains =

Antarctic mountain range

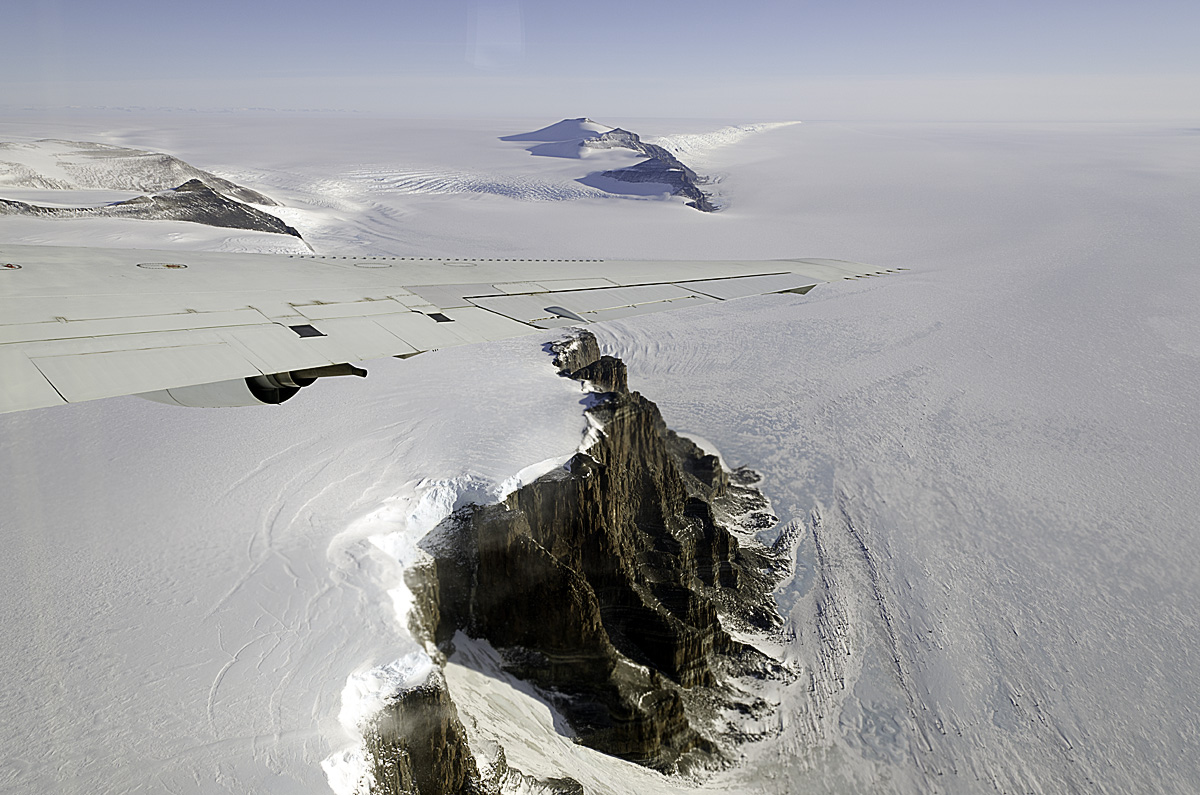
The tip of the NASA DC-8's wing cuts across a dramatic view of Antarctica's Theron Mountains on Oct. 21, 2011

The Theron Mountains (79°05′S 028°15′W) are a group of mountains, extending in a NE-SW direction for 45 kilometres (28 mi) and rising 1,175 metres (3,855 ft), on the eastern side of the Filchner Ice Shelf. They were first seen from the air in 1956 by the Commonwealth Trans-Antarctic Expedition (CTAE) and named for the Theron, the ship of the CTAE in 1955–56.
