= February 1979 =

Month of 1979

| << | February 1979 | | | | | >> |
| Su | Mo | Tu | We | Th | Fr | Sa |
| | | | | 1 | 2 | 3 |
| 4 | 5 | 6 | 7 | 8 | 9 | 10 |
| 11 | 12 | 13 | 14 | 15 | 16 | 17 |
| 18 | 19 | 20 | 21 | 22 | 23 | 24 |
| 25 | 26 | 27 | 28 |

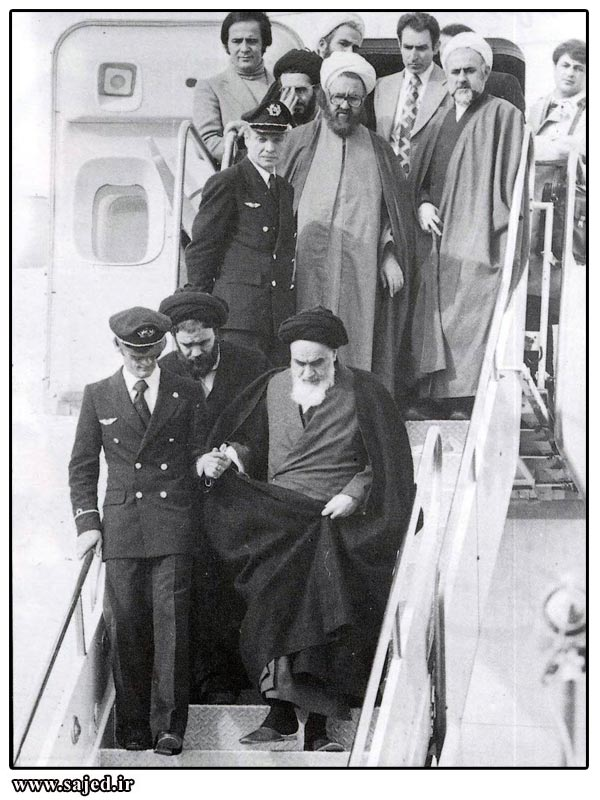
February 1, 1979: The Ayatollah Ruhollah Khomeini returns to Iran and creates the Islamic Republic

The following events occurred in February 1979:

== February 1, 1979 (Thursday) ==
- The Ayatollah Ruhollah Khomeini returned to Iran after nearly 15 years of exile. After a five and one-half hour flight from Paris on Air France Flight 4721 jumbo, a chartered 747, Khomeini stepped off of the plane at 9:30 in the morning local time at Mehrabad Airport. The arrival ceremonies were viewed by millions of Iranians on television, but the broadcast was abruptly shut down by angry Iranian Army officials and was replaced by a photo of Shah Mohammed Reza Pahlevi. Speaking to a crowd at the airport, Khomeini said "Our final victory will come when all foreigners are out of the country. I beg Allah to cut off the hands of all evil foreigners and all their helpers." Khomeini then got into a car and was driven in a motorcade on a 19 mi (31 km) tour of Tehran streets, lined by cheering supporters.
- Patty Hearst, who had been kidnapped from her apartment on February 4, 1974 and later joined her kidnappers in bank robberies, was released from federal prison after her sentence was commuted by U.S. President Jimmy Carter. At 7:30 in the morning, Ms. Hearst walked out of the women's Federal Correctional Institute in Pleasanton, California, and was driven to her mother's home in Hillsborough.
- Died: Abdi Ipekci, 49, Turkish journalist and editor of the daily newspaper Milliyet, was killed in a shooting at his home by the Grey Wolves ultranationalist group. One of his assassins, Mehmet Ali Agca, would later attempt to assassinate Pope John Paul II.
- Born: Clodoaldo Silva, Brazilian paralympic swimmer and 2004 winner of six gold medals in the Paralympics; in Natal, Rio Grande do Norte

== February 2, 1979 (Friday) ==
- The Ayatollah Khomeini created the Council of the Islamic Revolution.
- A 29-letter alphabet for the Dyula language of the African nation of Burkina Faso was given official status by the (then) government of Upper Volta.
- Mau Lear, who had been designated as the President of Fretilin (Frente Revolucionária de Timor-Leste Independente), seeking the liberation of East Timor from Indonesia, was tracked down and executed by Indonesian troops. Lear had taken office after his predecessor, Nicolau Lobato, was killed eight weeks earlier on December 13.
- Born: Fani Chalkia, Greek track athlete and gold medalist in the men's 400m hurdles at the 2004 Olympics; in Larissa
- Died:
  - Sid Vicious (stage name for John Simon Ritchie), 21, British musician for the punk rock group Sex Pistols, died of a drug overdose 13 hours after being released on bail while awaiting trial on the October 12 stabbing death of Nancy Spungen. Upon his release, Vicious celebrated at a party in his honor at his new girlfriend apartment in the Greenwich Village section of New York City and died of an overdose of heroin. Vicious had just completed a court-ordered 55-day detoxification program at the prison on Rikers Island.
  - Kenneth "Tug" Wilson, 82, American amateur sports administrator who served as President of the U.S. Olympic Committee from 1953 to 1965, and Commissioner of the Big Ten Conference from 1945 to 1961
  - Aaron Douglas, 79, African-American painter and illustrator

== February 3, 1979 (Saturday) ==
- Airship Industries of the UK flew the prototype of its new airship, the AD500, with increased speed and maneuverability. The lone ship did not fly again after being damaged in a storm on March 8.
- The Canadian sketch comedy TV series You Can't Do That on Television, which would later become the first successful TV series on the cable network Nickelodeon, premiered on CTV.
- Born: Epiphanius of Kyiv, leader of the Orthodox Church of Ukraine since 2019; as Serhii Petrovych Dumenko, in Vovkove, Ukrainian SSR, Soviet Union
- Died:
  - Charlemae Hill Rollins, 81, pioneering African-American librarian and author
  - Betty Danko, 74, American stuntwoman and stunt double on film

== February 4, 1979 (Sunday) ==
- The Interim Government of Iran was established by the Ayatollah Khomeini, with Mehdi Bazargan as Prime Minister of Iran
- The CBS television show Co-Ed Fever, the third of three college-themed programs inspired by the success of the film Animal House, premiered for its first and only episode. The show followed the premieres of Delta House on ABC on January 18 and Brothers and Sisters on NBC on January 21.
- Died: Claude "Jack" Massop, 29, Jamaican gangster and leader of the Phoenix Gang, was killed in a gun battle with police in Spanish Town.

== February 5, 1979 (Monday) ==
- Joachim Yhombi-Opango was forced to resign as President of the People's Republic of the Congo, by a vote of the Central Committee of the African nation's only political party, the Congolese Workers Party. Yhombi-Opango had taken office after the assassination of President Marien Ngouabi on March 18, 1977, was then arrested in Brazzaville by his successor, Denis Sassou Nguesso.
- Sara Jane Moore, convicted of firing a pistol at then-U.S. President Gerald R. Ford in 1975, escaped from a women's federal prison in Alderson, West Virginia, along with another inmate, by climbing a 12-foot (3.7 m) high fence. The two women hitchhiked and were given a ride to Lewisburg, 19 miles (31 km) from the prison, by a good samaritan who called police after realizing that Moore and her friend, Marlene Martino, were escaped prisoners. A taxicab driver in Lewisburg then drove the two to White Sulphur Springs, where a security guard recognized them and detained them until they could be arrested.
- Argentina established the Belgrano II Base in Antarctica, the third most southern of Antarctic bases
- Protesting the lack of help from the federal government in raising the amount of government farm price supports, hundreds of protesting U.S. farmers and their families jammed the streets of Washington, D.C. by coming in from multiple directions in what they billed as a "Tractorcade", a slow-moving motorcade of farm tractors, camper vans and pickup trucks. Other members of the group blocked the entrances to the U.S. Department of Agriculture by chaining together tractors. Traffic was cleared after three hours and 20 farmers were arrested by city police.
- Born:
  - Muhammad Ali, Prince of the Sa'id, son of the last monarch of Egypt, King Fuad II, and heir apparent to the abolished throne; in Cairo
  - Paulo Gonçalves (motorcyclist) Portuguese rally racing motorcycle rider. He won the FIM Cross-Country Rallies World Championship in 2013; in Gemeses (killed 2020)
  - Chhetan Gurung, Nepali film director, died of liver failure, 2020
- Died: Nikolay Sakharov, 24, Soviet serial killer known as "The Vologda Ripper", was executed by a firing squad.

== February 6, 1979 (Tuesday) ==
- Iran announced that it would withdraw from the Baghdad Pact of 1955 that had created an alliance between Iran, the United Kingdom, Iraq, Pakistan, and Turkey. Iraq had withdrawn after the overthrow of its monarchy in 1958, and the alliance had been renamed the Central Treaty Organization (CENTO). Iran's Foreign Minister Ahmad Mirfendereski, who had been appointed by the Shah of Iran in the final month of Iran's monarchy and had continued under the Ayatollah Khomeini, said that continued membership in CENTO would not be compatible with Iran's new foreign policy.
- Died: Mary Bell, 75, Australian aviator who helped establish the Women's Auxiliary Australian Air Force (WAAAF) during World War II after organizing the Women's Air Training Corps in 1939 as a volunteer paramilitary group

== February 7, 1979 (Wednesday) ==
- Supporters of the Ayatollah took over the Iranian law enforcement, courts and government administration. The Iranian National Consultative Assembly, adjourned and disbanded.
- Pluto moved inside Neptune's orbit for the first time since either planet was discovered.
- Dr. Josef Mengele, a Nazi German physician and SS officer known for carrying out medical experiments on prisoners in the Auschwitz concentration camp, drowned in South America, where he had been able to escape after World War II. Mengele, who was living in the São Paulo State of Brazil under the alias "Wolfgang Gerhard", was visiting friends in the resort town of Bertioga and was swimming in the ocean when he apparently suffered a stroke and was unable to surface. His remains were buried in a cemetery in Embu das Artes under the Gerhard name. In 1985, after the search for Dr. Mengele led police to the friends and the site of the grave, Mengele's body was exhumed and confirmed, on June 10, 1985, to be the cadaver of Dr. Mengele, confirmed further by DNA testing in 1992.
- The magazine Counterspy, which had identified active agents of the U.S. Central Intelligence Agency (CIA), revealed the identities of nine CIA agents stationed in Iran, and alleged that the CIA and the U.S. Department of Defense appeared to be preparing a military intervention in that country.
- The Panamanian-registered Skyluck, carrying 2,700 refugees who had fled Vietnam and the People's Republic of China, arrived in Hong Kong and was stopped by local police before it could make the unauthorized dispersion of potential immigrants. For almost five months, Skyluck refused to leave and the 2,700 refugees lived on board the ship. The stalemate would end on June 29 when some of the refugees cut the anchor chain, and the ship drifted away, struck rocks on Lamma Island and began to sink, forcing the evacuation— and arrest— of 2,000 refugees.
- Born: Tawakkol Karman, Yemeni human rights activist and 2011 Nobel Peace Prize laureate; in Taiz, Yemen Arab Republic
- Died:
  - General Su Zhenhua, 66, member of the Chinese Communist Party Politburo who worked at removing the "Gang of Four" from power in the 1970s after having been rehabilitated from disgrace during the Cultural Revolution
  - Charles Seeger, 92, American musicologist known for theorizing dissonant counterpoint; father of folk singer Pete Seeger

== February 8, 1979 (Thursday) ==
- Portugal, which had a colony off of the coast of mainland China, established diplomatic relations with the People's Republic of China, but Portuguese Prime Minister Carlos Mota Pinto told reporters that there would be no change in its administration of Macao. The island of Macao, a gambling resort with 300,000 people within its 32.9 square kilometres (12.7 sq mi), had been Portuguese territory since 1557, and was Portugal's only remaining overseas territory, as well as the oldest European colony in Asia.
- Born: Aleksey Mishin, Russian Greco-Roman Wrestler, 2004 Olympic gold medalist and 2007 world champion; in Ruzayevka, Mordovian ASSR, Soviet Union

== February 9, 1979 (Friday) ==
- Belgian biochemist Désiré Collen discovered that a specific tissue plasminogen activator protein (tPA) could be used in effectively dissolving blood clots. The finding that would lead to tPa therapy as a common, non-surgical treatment for most types of thrombosis, reducing the number of deaths from heart attacks and strokes caused by the blockage of blood vessels.
- The street gang adventure film The Warriors premiered nationwide in the United States from the Paramount Pictures studio and had the unexpected consequence of inspiring incidents of violence between rival gangs at American cinemas.
- Colonel Chadli Bendjedid took office as the third President of Algeria, two days after being overwhelmingly approved in a yes-or-no vote in which less than 50,000 out of 7.8 million voters reportedly opposed him.
- The 26th Mersenne prime number — specifically, a prime number that is one less than a power of two M_{n} (2^{n} − 1) — was discovered and proven with the use of a computer by an 18-year old American high school student, Landon Curt Noll. The number M_{n} (2^{23209} − 1) is 6,987 digits long.
- Born:
  - Zhang Ziyi, Chinese film actress; in Beijing
  - Irina Slutskaya, Russian figure skater and two-time world champion; in Moscow
- Died: Dennis Gabor, 78, Hungarian-born British physicist and winner of the 1971 Nobel Prize in Physics for his invention of holographic photography.

== February 10, 1979 (Saturday) ==
- At least 175 people were killed in street fighting in Tehran, as mobs defied a 4:30 p.m. curfew and orders to disperse. Imperial Guard Army troops, loyal to the Bakhtiar government were confronted by Iranian Air Force cadets and technicians from the Dahshan Tadeh Air Force Base, who wanted Bakhtiar to step down and to be replaced, and the rebellious cadets distributed weapons and ammunition to civilians. Government officials and prominent business leaders, who had fled to Mehrabad Airport in an attempt to get out of Iran before the Ayatollah's allies took control, found themselves trapped when the mob closed down the runways.

== February 11, 1979 (Sunday) ==
- Iran's military leaders, without consulting Prime Minister Shapour Bakhtiar, announced that they would remain "neutral" in the conflict between Islamic revolutionaries and the government put in power by the Shah. At 10:20 in the morning, the Supreme Council of the Iranian Army convened a meeting and, as stated in a radio announcement at 2:00, "in order to prevent further anarchy and bloodshed, decided to announce the army's neutrality in the present political crisis and ordered the troops to return to their garrisons." Guerrillas and rebel troops overwhelmed the remaining troops loyal to the Shah in armed street fighting, and the Ayatollah Khomeini took over rule of Iran.
- Thousands of prisoners incarcerated at the Gasre Prison in Tehran, including American employees of the Electronic Data Systems (EDS) firm run by H. Ross Perot, were freed after Perot financed a rescue operation led by retired U.S. Special Forces colonel Arthur D. Simons. In December, two engineers, William Gaylord and Paul Chiapparoni, had been arrested by the Shah's government on charges of bribery and the Imperial government had demanded a payment of $12,750,000 for their release.
- Elections were held for the parliament in Haiti Around 300 candidates contested the election, almost all of whom were supporters of President Jean-Claude Duvalier.
- A group of about 1,000 women political prisoners were released from Qasr Prison in Tehran.
- The Neil Simon play They're Playing Our Song began a successful run on Broadway for 1,082 performances, running until May 8, 1982
- The Australian version of 60 Minutes premiered on at 7:30 p.m. on the Nine Network and its affiliates, and would continue to be broadcast at that time more than 40 years later.
- A group of five men— Scott Moorman and four companions— departed from the port of Hana, Hawaii in a 17 feet (5.2 m) Boston Whaler, and were never seen alive again. Over the next nine years, the boat would drift in the North Pacific Ocean until being discovered in 1988 on the uninhabited Bokak Atoll, along with the remains of Moorman, 2,340 miles (3,770 km) away from their starting point.
- The Tanzanian military began its assault on the Simba Hills near the town of Kakuuto.
- Born: Brandy (stage name for Brandy Norwood), American singer and record producer; in McComb, Mississippi
- Died:
  - Lieutenant General Abdolali Badrei, the last commander of the Imperial Iranian Army and the Imperial Guard, was assassinated outside of army headquarters in Tehran.
  - Averil Deverell, 86, Irish barrister and one of the first two women (along with Frances Kyle) to be admitted to the practice of law in the United Kingdom. Both Deverell and Kyle were admitted to the Irish bar on November 1, 1921.

== February 12, 1979 (Monday) ==
- Air Rhodesia Flight 827 a scheduled flight between Kariba and Salisbury was shot down by Zimbabwe People's Revolutionary Army (ZIPRA) guerrillas using a Strela 2 missile. None of the 59 passengers or crew survived. Most of the passengers were returning home after vacation.
- Chad's Prime Minister Hissène Habré began the Battle of N'Djamena (1979), an attempt to overthrow his nation's President, Félix Malloum. After three days of street fighting in N'Djamena, Sudan mediated the conflict between the two parties. After three days of negotiations Malloum and Habre agreed to a ceasefire.
- The new government of Iran held a press conference, moderated by former professor of the Baylor University School of Medicine, Dr. Ebrahim Yazdi, to display the first prisoners of the new regime, former high officials of the imperial government. Chief among them was former Prime Minister Amir-Abbas Hoveyda, who had been jailed by the Shah in September, followed by the former commander of the Iranian Air Force, Lieutenant General Amir Hossein Rabii, and the former military governors of Tehran and Isfahan, Generals Amir Rahimi and Riza Nazih. Hoveyda had turned himself into the new authorities after being released from the Jamshidieh military complex, and told reporters that he expected a fair trial. Lt. General Rabii had traveled to Khomeini's headquarters in order to offer his resignation, and was arrested.
- Born: Jesse Spencer, Australian TV actor, in Melbourne

== February 13, 1979 (Tuesday) ==
- A powerful wind storm struck western Washington and sank half of the 6,471 feet (1,972 m) long Hood Canal Bridge, the longest floating bridge in the United States. At about 2:00 a.m., winds of 100 miles per hour (160 km/h) and powerful waves caused a pontoon in the center section of the bridge, which had operated since 1961, to give way. The 1.3 mi (2.1 km) span floated north and then capsized, sinking in 300 ft (91 m) deep water. The pressure of wind and wave on the Hood Canal Bridge stressed the structure enough to cause catastrophic failure. It was suspected that a severe list in the bridge exposed pontoon access hatches to the waves, which subsequently tore the covers loose and allowed water to enter the flotation devices, causing sections to sink. It would take nearly three years and over $140 million U.S. to rebuild the lost bridge.
- The Guardian Angels were formed in New York City as an unarmed organization of young crime fighters.
- Born:
  - Rafael Márquez, Mexican soccer football defender, with 147 appearances on the national team, 1997 to 2018; in Zamora, Michoacán
  - Anders Behring Breivik, Norwegian terrorist who killed 77 people on July 22, 2011; in Oslo
  - Rachel Reeves, British politician, Chancellor of the Exchequer (2024-2026), in Lewisham, London
  - Mena Suvari, American actress; in Newport, Rhode Island

== February 14, 1979 (Wednesday) ==
- In Kabul, Muslim extremists kidnapped the U.S. ambassador to Afghanistan, Adolph Dubs. Ambassador Dubs was killed during a gunfight between his kidnappers and police. At 8:45 in the morning, Dubs was being driven to the U.S. Embassy when his car was stopped by four gunmen wearing traffic policeman uniforms. Dubs was then taken to the Hotel Kabul where he was held hostage. Despite pleas from the Embassy for Afghan authorities to avoid attempting a rescue mission, Kabul policemen stormed the hotel room where Dubs was being held and shot everyone inside, including Dubs.
- The U.S. Embassy in Iran was overrun by Islamic militants from the Fadaiyan-e-Khalq, who took 21 people hostage— 18 civilian employees and three of the nineteen U.S. Marines who were guarding the embassy complex. After U.S. Ambassador William H. Sullivan ordered the surrender of the Embassy, the three Marines negotiated the release of the civilians and Iranian Foreign Minister Ebrahim Yazdi secured the end of the siege. USMC Kenneth Kraus, 22, who had been wounded was then taken to the Islamic Revolutionary Prison, and on February 20, subjected to a 10-minute trial, where he was convicted of murder and given a death sentence to be executed on February 22. Kraus was returned to the Embassy on February 21 and flown out of the country. On November 4, the U.S. Embassy would be taken over again and everyone inside would be taken hostage.
- The IBM 6670, the first American laser printer and scanner for businesses, was introduced by International Business Machines (IBM). Wang Laboratories had demonstrated a laser printer, the "Image Printer", in December, but the IBM 6670 had additional electronics that could transmit and receive data to and from other IBM computers, and could print 36 pages per minute.
- Born: Jocelyn Quivrin, French film actor, in Dijon; (killed in auto accident, 2009)
- Died: Reginald Maudling, 61, British MP who served as Chancellor of the Exchequer from 1962-1964, and as Home Secretary from 1970 to 1972

== February 15, 1979 (Thursday) ==
- An explosion in a Warsaw bank killed 49 people. The PKO Bank Polski, Poland's central savings bank, a three-story high building, had 200 people inside when the blast destroyed the structure at 12:37 in the afternoon. Although a natural gas explosion was suspected, there was no natural gas heating in the PKO building.
- Abu Dhabi, one of the United Arab Emirates, increased its price for oil by seven percent, triggering similar rises by other members of the Organization of the Petroleum Exporting Countries (OPEC). Qatar followed immediately, and Libya raised prices six days later.
- Dressed in his hospital gown, South Australia's premier Don Dunstan gave a televised speech and announced his resignation and retirement from politics. Dunstan had been state premier and chief executive of the government of the Australian state since 1970, and had made the decision to have the address televised directly from his room at the Calvary Hospital in North Adelaide.
- Born: Gordon Shedden, Scottish auto racer and three time British Touring Car Championship winner; in Edinburgh

== February 16, 1979 (Friday) ==
- The West African nation of Liberia publicly hanged the last seven people convicted of murder in the "Maryland ritual killings", so called because they occurred in Liberia's provincial county of Maryland. Between 1965 and 1977, over 100 Liberian citizens vanished in Maryland and their carefully mutilated bodies were found afterward. Among those convicted and hanged in the town of Harper after the final slaying, in 1977, of popular singer Moses Tweh, included the county's superintendent James Daniel Anderson and Allen Nathaniel Yancy, Maryland's delegate to the Liberian House of Representatives.
- The new government of Iran carried out its first executions of members of the Shah's regime. General Nematollah Nasiri, Director of Iran's secret police, SAVAK, was the first to be killed by a firing squad, followed by Paratroop Corps commander Manuchehr Khosrowdad and the former military provincial governors of Tehran and Isfahan, Generals Amir Rahimi and Riza Nazih, who had been put on display at a press conference four days earlier.
- Born: Valentino Rossi, Italian motorcycle racer and seven-time MotoGP world champion; in Urbino

== February 17, 1979 (Saturday) ==
- Troops from the People's Republic of China invaded Vietnam, launching the Sino-Vietnamese War. At 4:00 a.m. local time (2100 UTC), supported by aircraft and artillery, troops of China's People's Liberation Army from Yunnan Province and Guangxi Province swept across the 480 mi (770 km) border and crossed into the districts at Phong Thổ and Lai Châu in the Lai Châu Province and Móng Cái in the Quang Ninh Province, while China declared that Vietnam had "continually sent armed forces to encroach on Chinese territory and attack Chinese frontier guards and inhabitants", and that "Driven beyond forbearance, Chinese frontier troops have been forced to rise in counterattack." The initial invasion force was 85,000 troops who crossed on 26 points along the Chinese-Vietnamese border. Eventually, 200,000 PLA troops were in Vietnam and captured the province of Cao Bang and the provincial capital, Lang Son, on March 1. After declaring on March 5 that Vietnam had "learned its lesson", Chinese troops withdrew by March 16 without keeping any Vietnamese territory permanently.
- For the first time since 1972, high-ranking officials of North Korea and South Korea met in conference at the neutral border station at Panmunjom.
- China closed the last of its May 7 Cadre Schools that had been established during the Cultural Revolution on May 7, 1968, to "re-educate" intellectuals, government bureaucrats and members of the Chinese Communist Party.
- National Hockey League star goaltender Bernie Parent of the Philadelphia Flyers suffered a career-ending eye injury in a game against the New York Rangers.
- Born: Bear McCreary, American film composer, in Bellingham, Washington

== February 18, 1979 (Sunday) ==
- The Sahara Desert experienced its first snowfall in recorded history, and flakes fell for 30 minutes. The snow came down in and around the town of Aïn Séfra in Algeria, and snow would fall again almost 38 years later on December 19, 2016 followed by snows in 2017, 2018, 2021 and 2022, with as much as 30 centimetres (12 in) accumulating in 2018 in higher elevations.
- Multiparty parliamentary elections were held in Bangladesh for the first time since martial law had been declared in the South Asian nation in 1975. The Nationalist Party, led by Bangladesh President Ziaur Rahman, won 203 of the 300 seats, and the Awami League, led by Abdul Malek Ukil, won 40. The election was noted by a reporter to be "a surprisingly subdued contest with relatively few charges of fraud or vote-rigging."
- The 1979 Daytona 500 was televised on CBS, the first ever live airing of a 500-mile (800 km) race on U.S. television, bringing NASCAR stock car racing to a wider audience. In a dramatic finish, Richard Petty won the race after leaders Cale Yarborough and Donnie Allison collided on the final lap.
- The Khomeini government in Iran severed diplomatic relations with Israel. Twenty-two Israeli diplomats were expelled from Tehran, and employees of the Iranian legation in Ramat Gan, a suburb of Tel Aviv, were summoned home.
- Roots: The Next Generations, the sequel to the popular Roots miniseries of 1977, began airing as a miniseries over seven consecutive nights.

== February 19, 1979 (Monday) ==
- For the first time, the U.S. House of Representatives began televising its sessions live, initially on a closed-circuit network to TV sets in the offices of Congressional representatives, as a means of transmitting the broadcasts at any time, and at no charge, to U.S. television networks The system would begin transmission the next month on cable TV on the Cable-Satellite Public Affairs Network, or C-SPAN.
- Presidential elections were held in the South African bantustan of Transkei, whose status as an independent nation was recognized only by South Africa and Rhodesia, and Chief Minister Kaiser Matanzima was declared the winner.
- Born: Vitas (stage name for Vitaly Vladasovich Grachev), Ukrainian singer known for his falsetto voice; in Daugavpils, Latvian SSR, Soviet Union

== February 20, 1979 (Tuesday) ==
- Poisoning by a high concentration of carbon dioxide killed 175 people in the Indonesian village of Pucukan on Java in Indonesia, built on a plateau near the Mount Sinila crater of the Dieng Volcanic Complex. Rescuers evacuated 9,000 people in Pucukan and a neighboring village. A small eruption from Kawah Simla and neighboring Sigluduk released the gas that had been trapped underground.
- Iran's new government executed four former generals who had worked for the Shah, with a firing squad shooting the Imperial Guard commander, General Parviz Amin Afshan; General Hossein Hamadanian, commander of the SAVAK secret police in Kermanshah; General Nematollah Motamadi, the military governor of Qazvin; and Brigadier General Manuchehr Malek, who had commanded an infantry that had killed protesters against the Shah in Qazvin. After a perfunctory hearing, the four men were taken at 2:40 in the morning to "the roof of an old building within the Khomeini headquarters" and shot to death. A spokesman for the Revolutionary Committee said in a statement, "Sixty-five thousand people have been killed in this country in the past year... and these generals are responsible for it."
- Born: Song Chong-gug, South Korean soccer football midfielder and national team member; in Danyang

== February 21, 1979 (Wednesday) ==
- In the most deadly engagement of the Uganda–Tanzania War, the Battle of Gayaza Hills was fought in southern Uganda near the town of Gayaza, with 24 soldiers of the Tanzania People's Defence Force (TADF) 206th Brigade, and an undetermined number of Ugandan soldiers of the 2nd Paratrooper Battalion, being killed in the fighting. The Tanzanians routed the Ugandans from the hill country, and captured Mbarara on February 25.
- Japan's first x-ray astronomy satellite, CORSA-b (Cosmic Radiation Satellite), later called Hakucho, was successfully launched from the Kagoshima Space Center (now the Uchinoura Space Center) on the island of Kyushu It would re-enter the Earth's atmosphere after orbital decay on April 16, 1985.
- Deputy Premier Ugo La Malfa was asked to be the new Prime Minister of Italy by President Sandro Pertini, marking the first time since World War II that the leader of a party other than Democrazia Cristiana, the Christian Democrats, had been given the task of attempting to form a workable government in Italy. La Malfa, the 75-year-old leader of the Italian Republican Party, would be unable to put together a coalition and suffered a fatal heart attack five weeks later, dying on March 26.
- Born:
  - Jennifer Love Hewitt, American TV and film actress; in Waco, Texas
  - Jordan Peele, American comedian and filmmaker, Academy Award winner for Best Original Screenplay; in New York City.
  - Carly Colón Puerto Rican professional wrestler; in San Juan
- Died: Ray Whitley, 77, American songwriter and singer known for authoring "Back in the Saddle Again"

== February 22, 1979 (Thursday) ==
Saint Lucia flag

- Saint Lucia became independent from the United Kingdom. John Compton, who had been the colonial premier since 1967, continued as the first Prime Minister of Saint Lucia, and Sir Allen Montgomery Lewis, became the Caribbean island nation's first Governor-General after having been the colonial governor since 1974. Government workers went on strike the day before independence was granted at 12:01 a.m. with the lowering of the Union Jack at the capital, Castries, and the raising of the Saint Lucia flag.
- ESPN, the Entertainment and Sports Programming Network, fell under the primary (85%) ownership of Getty Oil, six months before ESPN began telecasting on cable systems on September 7.

== February 23, 1979 (Friday) ==
- Skirmishes broke out between the Yemen Arab Republic, commonly called "North Yemen", and the People's Democratic Republic of Yemen ("South Yemen") and North Yemeni soldiers crossed into the south at three points on the border, and the South Yemeni government shot down a North Yemen airplane.
- The Deer Hunter, a film about three Vietnam War veterans, was released across the United States days after receiving nine Academy Award nominations.

== February 24, 1979 (Saturday) ==
- The Tanzanian Army and Ugandan rebels captured Masaka, the 10th largest city in Uganda, after a two day battle and artillery bombardment. Capture of a major town, after having marched 45 miles (72 km) into Uganda from the border, placed the Tanzania People's Defence Force within 80 miles (130 km) of the Ugandan capital, Kampala, which would fall on April 11.
- The National Basketball League (NBL), Australia's first nationwide professional basketball association, opened its first season, playing 18 regular-season games from February to June with eight franchises in southern and eastern Australia in New South Wales, Queensland, South Australia, Victoria, and the ACT. In the first game, which started at 7:30 p.m., the visiting Canberra Cannons beat the Brisbane Bullets, 77 to 70, and in the other two games, the Glenelg Tigers (at Adelaide) won, 68 to 65, over the Sydney Astronauts; and the Nunawading Spectres (in Melbourne) defeated the Newcastle Falcons, 78 to 62. The other teams in the 9-team league were the Bankstown Bruins (in Sydney); the St Kilda Saints (in Melbourne) and the West Adelaide Bearcats.
- With the advent of the Islamic Revolutionary Court system in Iran, Sadegh Khalkhali was appointed as the chief Sharia law judge to interpret Islamic law concerning crime and punishment. In the first weeks of the Iranian revolution, Khalkhali meted out death sentence to hundreds of former government officials for violations of Sharia law.
- The Solwind satellite, part of the Orbiting Solar Observatory series of the U.S., was launched into orbit and would become the first satellite to discover a comet. On September 13, 1985, after the Solwind battery deteriorated, the orbiter would be the first satellite to be destroyed by a U.S. anti-satellite missile, the ASM-135 ASAT.
- In U.S. college basketball, a game that would eventually lead the alteration of the NCAA rules for introduction of a shot clock took place, as the North Carolina Tar Heels took only two shots in the game's first half, and the Duke Blue Devils led 7 to 0 at half time. In the second half, UNC abandoned its "four corners offense" and both teams scored 40 points for a 47 to 40 Duke win. Starting with the 1985-86 NCAA college basketball season, a 45-second shot clock would be required for every NCAA game.

== February 25, 1979 (Sunday) ==
- Soyuz 32 was launched from the Soviet Union with cosmonauts Vladimir Lyakhov and Valery Ryumin, who boarded the Salyut 6 space station and would remain there, alone, for almost six months. Originally, Lyahkov and Ryumin were scheduled to return to Earth after a little more than six weeks. On April 10, however, a replacement crew was unable to dock Soyuz 33 to the space station and the two cosmonauts were not able to return until August 21, setting a new record of 175 days in space.

Voyager 1's approach to Jupiter

- The closest examination from Earth, up to that time, of the "Great Red Spot" of the planet Jupiter, took place as the U.S. Voyager 1 spacecraft came within 5.7 million miles (9.2 million kilometers) of the planet, yielding details of the speed and movement of a Jovian storm that has been observed from Earth since September 5, 1831.
- Born: László Bodnár, Hungarian soccer football star; in Mátészalka
- Died: Henrich Focke, 88, German aviation engineer who designed (in 1936) the Fw 61, Germany's first successful helicopter, the Focke-Wulf Fw 61

== February 26, 1979 (Monday) ==
- The last total solar eclipse visible in North America during the 20th Century took place.
- Operation Vanity was launched by the Rhodesian Air Force as a bombing mission over neighboring Angola to destroy a training camp near the Angolan town of Luso, housing 3,000 guerrillas of the Zimbabwe People's Revolutionary Army (ZIPRA) in retaliation for the shootdown of Air Rhodesia Flight 827. The Luso camp was bombed, killing 160 ZIPRA soldiers and wounding 530.
- The first double decker trains in the U.S., the Superliner railcars entered revenue service with Amtrak, with the initial testing taking place on Amtrak's run between Chicago and Milwaukee.
- Born: Corinne Bailey Rae, British R&B singer and songwriter, Grammy Award winner; in Leeds, West Yorkshire

== February 27, 1979 (Tuesday) ==
- Jane Byrne scored "the most stunning political upset in Chicago history", defeating incumbent mayor Michael Bilandic in the Democratic Party primary and breaking the political dynasty created by Mayor Richard Daley.
- The annual Mardi Gras celebration in New Orleans was canceled due to a strike called by the New Orleans Police Department. The first parades, scheduled to start on February 17, 18 and 19, were canceled on February 16, and the parades' sponsors announced cancellation of all events on February 20.

== February 28, 1979 (Wednesday) ==
- The United States Embassy in Taipei closed after 29 years, following the U.S. termination of diplomatic recognition of the Republic of China at the end of 1978 and the move of embassy staff and records to Beijing in the People's Republic of China. The building is now occupied by the Taipei Film House, a movie theater.
- Born:
  - Sébastien Bourdais, French professional auto racer, winner of four consecutive Champ Car World Series titles from 2004 to 2007; in Le Mans
  - Michael Bisping, English UFC Middleweight Champion ultimate fighter; at a British military base in Nicosia, Cyprus
