= April 1979 =

Month of 1979

<<	April 1979					>>
Su	Mo	Tu	We	Th	Fr	Sa
1	2	3	4	5	6	7
8	9	10	11	12	13	14
15	16	17	18	19	20	21
22	23	24	25	26	27	28
29	30

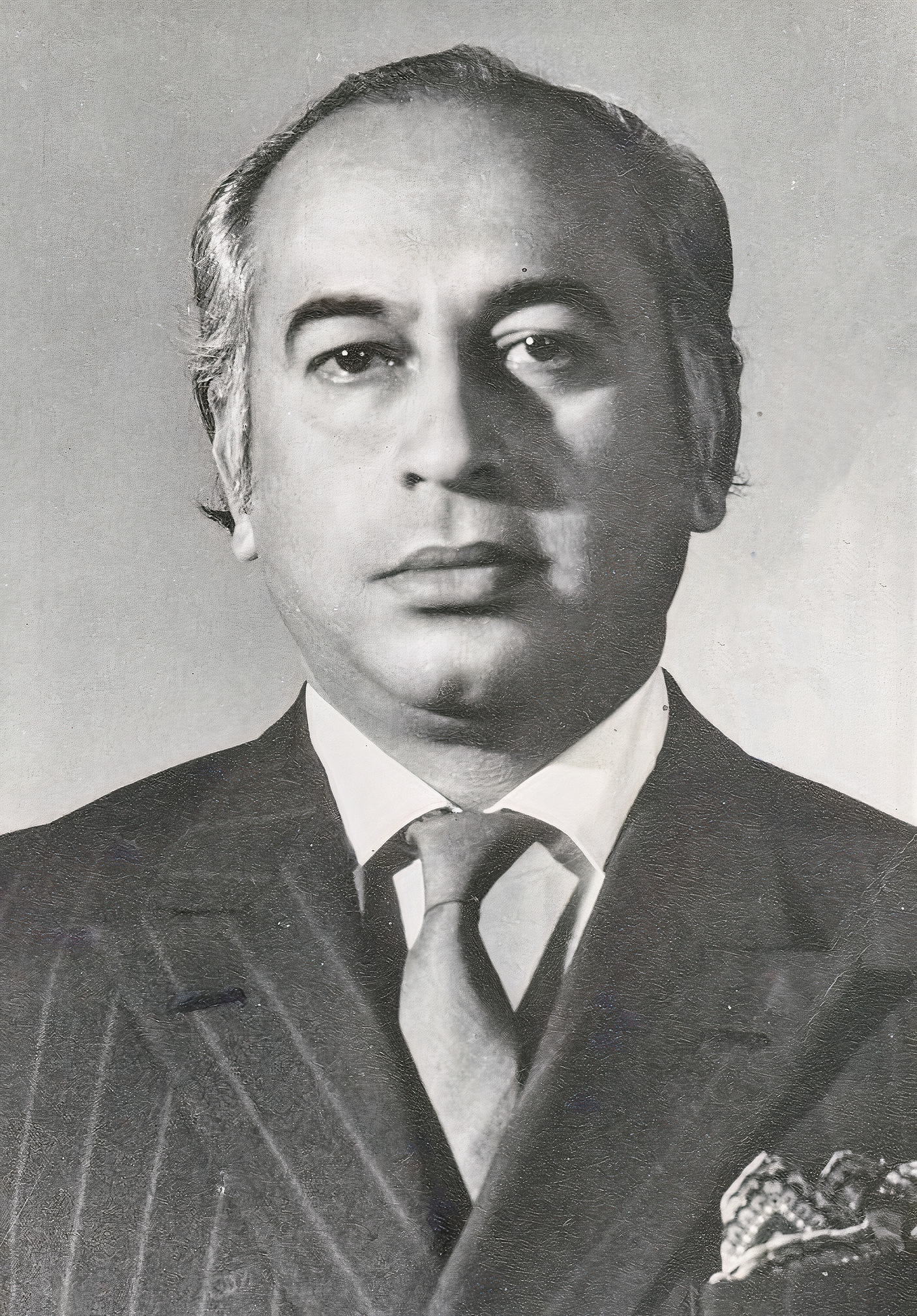
April 4, 1979: Former Pakistan President Bhutto hanged

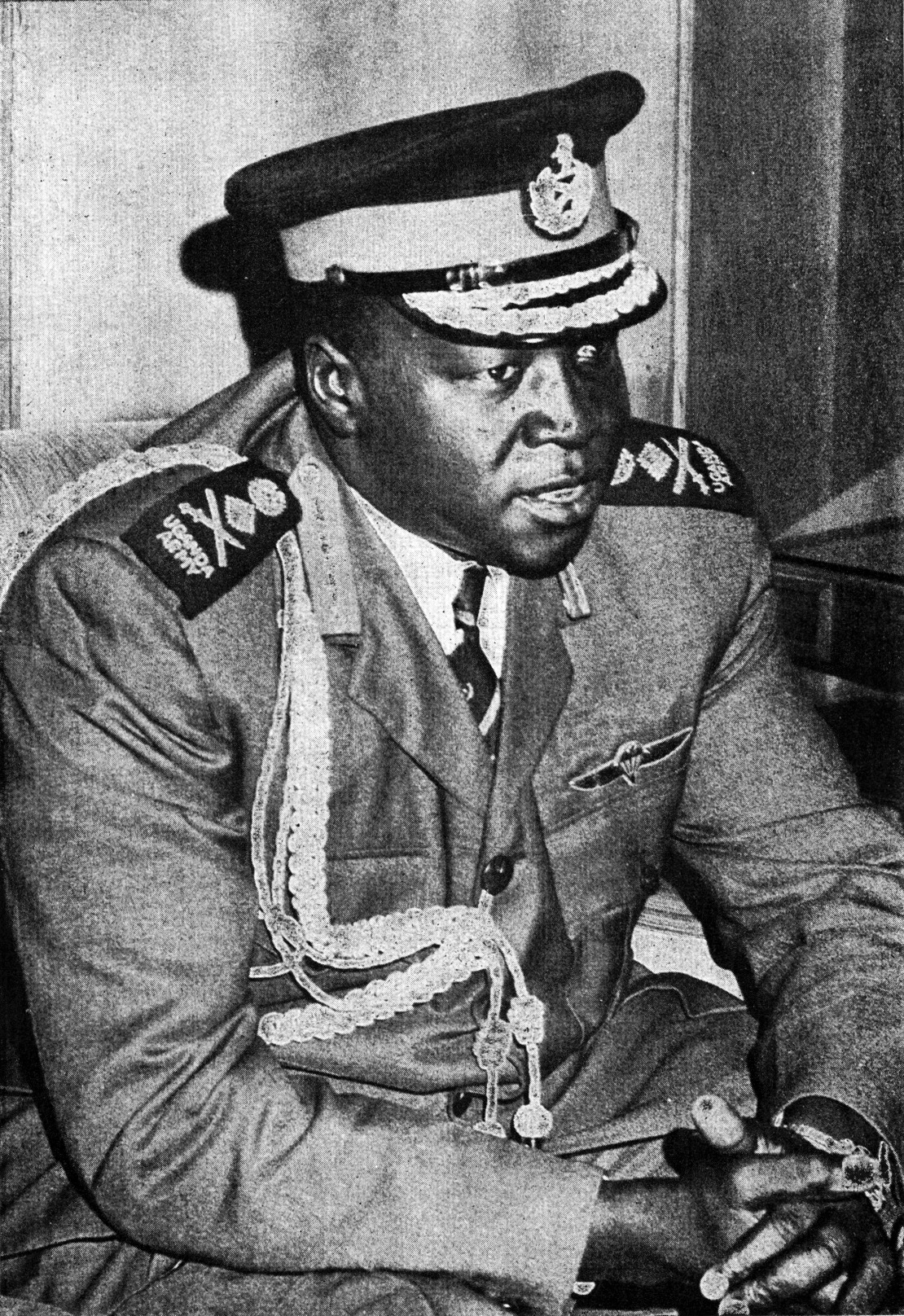
April 11, 1979: Ugandan despot Idi Amin Dada driven from power by neighboring Army of Tanzania

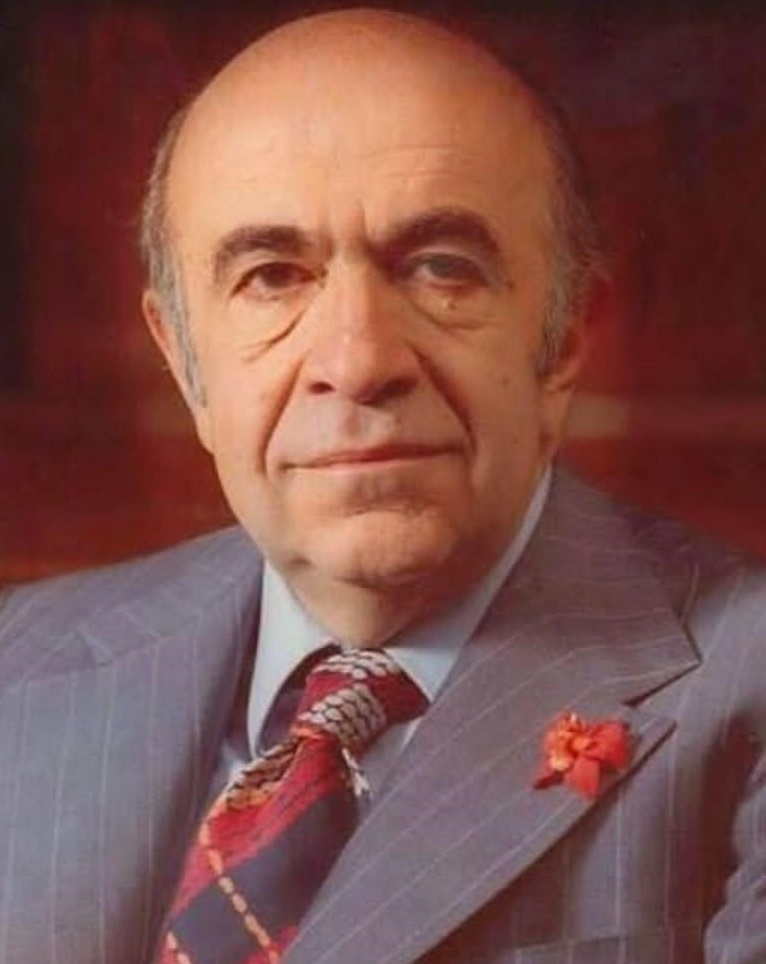
April 7, 1979: Former Iranian Premier Hoveyda executed by firing squad

The following events occurred in April 1979:

== April 1, 1979 (Sunday) ==
- The People's Republic of China reversed its policy of allowing its citizens to post "big character posters" as an expression of free speech. Beijing city workers were ordered to remove those that had been put up for the past month. Chinese authorities allowed posters to be placed in one approved location, Democracy Wall, a brick edifice around a bus station on Chang An Boulevard. Four people were arrested a few days later, as they tried to test the new policy.
- Iran's government became an Islamic Republic, after approval of the abolition of the monarchy by 98 percent of voters.
- Police in Austria locked Andreas Mihavecz in a holding cell in the basement of a jail in Bregenz, and then forgot him. He was not noticed and released until April 18, surviving for nearly three weeks without food or drink. The three jail officials responsible for Mihavecz's confinement were later sentenced to jail terms, albeit with food and drink provided during their confinement.
- The extreme sport of bungee jumping was first performed by two Oxford University students, David Kirke and Simon Keeling. The sport was inspired by the "vine jumping" practiced as part of the culture of the Ni-Vanuatu people in the South Pacific. Kirke and Keeling jumped off the 250-foot (76 m) high Clifton Suspension Bridge in the English city of Bristol. Kirke and Keeling would bring the sport (and the term "bungee jumpers") to the United States on October 8, when they jumped off the Golden Gate Bridge in San Francisco with three other people. They were arrested by the California Highway Patrol.
- The cable TV network Nickelodeon debuted on Warner Cable TV systems throughout the United States. The network was formerly called "C-3". It was originally limited to the QUBE system in Columbus, Ohio since December 1, 1977.
- Dale Earnhardt won his first career NASCAR race at the 1979 Southeastern 500 at Bristol Motor Speedway. He would go on to win 76 races and 7 championships during his career.
- Born: Ruth Beitia, Spanish Olympic champion high jumper; in Santander

== April 2, 1979 (Monday) ==
- Spores of anthrax bacterium Bacillus anthracis were accidentally released from a Soviet biowarfare laboratory and killed 66 people in Sverdlovsk (now Yekaterinburg in Russia).
- Born:
  - Jesse Carmichael, American keyboardist for Maroon 5; in Boulder, Colorado
  - Moise Poida, Vanuatuan footballer and manager

== April 3, 1979 (Tuesday) ==
- Jane Byrne was elected as Mayor of Chicago, becoming the first woman to serve in that job and the first mayor in 46 years to come from somewhere other than the neighborhood of Bridgeport on Chicago's South Side. In February, Byrne had defeated incumbent Mayor Michael A. Bilandic in the Democratic primary election.
- Born: Gregoire Boissenot, French pop singer billed as "Gregoire"; in Senlis, Oise

== April 4, 1979 (Wednesday) ==
- Zulfiqar Ali Bhutto, 51, who had served as President of Pakistan from 1971 to 1973, and Prime Minister from 1973 to 1977, was executed by hanging at the Rawalpindi District Jail, after President Mohammed Zia ul-Haq rejected international pleas for a last minute reprieve of Bhutto's death sentence. The hanging took place at 4:00 in the morning. Bhutto had been convicted, along with four officials of his secret police, of having conspired in 1974 to assassinate a political opponent, Ahmed Raza Kasuri. Bhutto and the co-conspirators were hanged on the same day. Bhutto's body was then taken to the city of Larkana for a burial ceremony.
- The pilot and co-pilot of TWA Flight 841 were able to regain control of a sudden spiral dive that had sent the Boeing 727 plummeting to earth at more than 600 miles per hour (970 km/h) or Mach 1 and that placed them only seconds away from a crash that would have killed all 82 passengers and seven crew. The TWA jet dropped from an altitude of 39,000 feet (12,000 m) to 5,000 feet (1,500 m) in 63 seconds, doing a complete roll twice on the way down. Pilot Harvey S. Gibson was able to save the plane by lowering the landing gear, which produced enough drag to slow the descent and allowed him to level the aircraft. The jet was flying from New York to Minneapolis when, at 8:48 p.m. local time, it suddenly went into the dive while 39,000 feet above Midland, Michigan.
- A direct telephone link was activated between the offices of the Prime Minister of Israel, Menahem Begin, and the President of Egypt, Anwar Sadat.
- Born:
  - Heath Ledger, Australian film actor; in Perth, Western Australia (died of overdose, 2008)
  - Roberto Luongo, Canadian NHL hockey goaltender; in Montreal
  - Maksim Opalev, Russian canoeist and Olympic gold medalist; in Volgograd, Russian SFSR, Soviet Union
- Died: Edgar Buchanan, 76, American TV and film actor known for Petticoat Junction

== April 5, 1979 (Thursday) ==
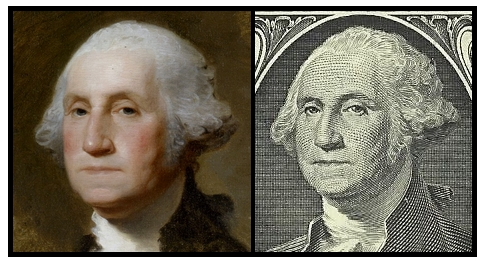
The "Athenaeum Portrait" and a $1 reproduction

- The National Portrait Gallery of the Smithsonian Institution purchased the most reproduced painting in United States history, the Athenaeum Portrait of George Washington, painted by Gilbert Stuart in 1796, paying five million dollars for Stuart's pair of paintings of George Washington and Martha Washington. For more than 100 years, the painting had been displayed in the Boston Museum of Fine Arts where it was on loan from the Athenaeum. Although the painting was unfinished, the iconic image of the first president of the United States is engraved on the U.S. one-dollar bill and reproductions were displayed in school classrooms throughout the U.S.
- The government of East Germany issued a regulation prohibiting foreign currency, including West Germany's Deutsche Mark, from being used as legal tender. Since 1974, East Germany had permitted people to use foreign money to purchase Western-made goods at its Intershop chain of retail stores, as a means of taking the West German mark out of circulation. The new rule, published in newspapers nationwide, set a deadline of April 16 to exchange their holdings of foreign money for Intershop coupons.

== April 6, 1979 (Friday) ==
- After having helped defend the regime of Uganda's ruler Idi Amin Dada during the Uganda–Tanzania War, Libya removed its support and airlifted all of its troops. With more than 1,000 soldiers and as many as 2,000 in total, the entire Libyan force was transported from Kampala to the airbase at Nakasongola and loaded onto C-130s and Boeing 727s for the return to Tripoli.
- President Mustafa Ould Salek of Mauritania announced the dissolution of the West African nation's parliament, the National Assembly, and its replacement by a Supreme Military Council chaired by Colonel Ahmed Ould Bouceif, who declared himself the Prime Minister. Although Salek retained the title of president as a ceremonial head of state, Colonel Bouceif had engineered the coup to install military rule and Salek would be ousted two months later.
- Died: Norman Tokar, 59, U.S. film and TV director

== April 7, 1979 (Saturday) ==
- The Battle of Entebbe, a turning point in the Uganda–Tanzania War, began as the Tanzania People's Defence Force (TPDF) 208th brigade reached the airfield serving the capital of Uganda and captured or destroyed most of the aircraft of the Uganda Army Air Force and forced the withdrawal of Libyan troops who had been defending the regime of Uganda's President Idi Amin. Tanzanian forces killed 300 Libyan soldiers, including 39 who had been attempting to evacuate on a C-130 troop transport that was shot down as it was taking off, and forced the rest to flee by motor vehicle or on foot. Within hours after the pre-dawn attack, Entebbe was captured, placing the Tanzanian forces only 13 miles (21 km) from the outskirts of Kampala and 20 miles (32 km) from the city center.
- USS Ohio, described by the U.S. Navy as "the most formidable strategic weapons system ever devised", was launched from the General Dynamics shipyard at Groton, Connecticut. It, and the 17 subsequently-built Ohio-class submarines, remain the largest U.S. submarines ever built, with capacity to carry 24 Trident II thermonuclear missiles, and displacing 18,750 tons submerged.
- Died: Amir-Abbas Hoveyda, 60, Prime Minister of Iran from 1965 to 1977 during the reign of the Shah, was executed by a firing squad at Qasr Prison in Tehran. The execution was carried out at 6:00 in the evening, about 15 minutes after he had been tried, convicted of corruption in office, and sentenced to death.

== April 8, 1979 (Sunday) ==
- English comedian Rowan Atkinson appeared on a television special program on ITV, Canned Laughter, in which he introduced a character, "Robert Box", whose silly behavior and nerdish appearance would be a prototype of his iconic act, Mr. Bean, in 1990.
- Using a Cray supercomputer, U.S. mathematicians David Slowinski and Harry L. Nelson discovered the 27th Mersenne prime number — specifically a prime number that is one less than a power of two M_{n} (2^{n} − 1). The number M_{n} (2^{44497} − 1) is 13,395 digits long.
- Roger Sydnor, a 30-year-old book salesman from Manhattan Beach, California, fell 250 feet (76 m) to his death from the South Rim of the Grand Canyon while taking photographs of the sunrise. He had apparently slipped in snow and his camera was found at the edge of the cliff from which he fell.
- Born:
  - Mohamed Kader Toure, Togolese soccer football forward; in Sokode
  - Alexi Laiho, Finnish rock guitarist; in Espoo (d. 2020)

== April 9, 1979 (Monday) ==
- After more than 25 years of service, the world's first nuclear-powered submarine, USS Nautilus, departed on its final voyage, receiving a sendoff from Groton, Connecticut for a 47-day journey via the Panama Canal to the Mare Island Naval Shipyard in California, where its nuclear power would be deactivated on May 26.
- Born:
  - Keshia Knight Pulliam, American TV actress known for The Cosby Show as a child, and for Tyler Perry's House of Payne as an adult; in Newark, New Jersey
  - Mario Matt, Austrian skier and Olympic gold medalist; in Zams
  - Sebastian Silva, Chilean film director; in Santiago
- Died:
  - Pak Machjar (Raden Machjar Angga Koesoemadinata), 76, Sundanese Indonesian composer and musicologist who created the solfège system of music notation and the 17-tone model for Sundanese music
  - General Amir Hossein Rabii, 48, the last commander of the Imperial Iranian Air Force was executed at the Qasr prison along with nine other military and civilian prisoners

== April 10, 1979 (Tuesday) ==
- A series of 26 tornadoes swept across Texas, killing 58 people in four communities, with 44 dead in the city of Wichita Falls. The other casualties were 11 in the towns of Vernon and Harrold, and three in Lawton, Oklahoma.
- Born:
  - Tsuyoshi Domoto, best-selling Japanese pop singer; in Nara, Nara Prefecture
  - Sophie Ellis-Bextor, best-selling British pop singer; in Hounslow, London
  - Ryan Agoncillo, Filipino TV actor and singer; in Manila
  - Rachel Corrie, American activist killed in the Palestinian intifadeh (d. 2003)
- Died: Nino Rota, 67, Italian film score composer

== April 11, 1979 (Wednesday) ==
- At least 36 people were killed in Rawalpindi in Pakistan, and 43 injured, by the explosion of gunpowder stored in an underground room that was below shops that sold fireworks to the general public. Reportedly, the two-story building (which was leveled) above the storage area "housed 15 families and three licensed fireworks shops".
- The new government of the Islamic Republic of Iran executed 11 former government officials by firing squad, including the SAVAK secret police director Hassan Pakravan, 67; Minister of Foreign Affairs Abbas Ali Khalatbari, 66; and mayor of Tehran Gholamreza Nikpey, 57.
- At 3:59 in the afternoon local time (1259 UTC), the commander of the Tanzanian Army made the first broadcast from the captured Radio Uganda studio in the capital, Kampala, and announced, "Idi Amin is no longer in power." Lieutenant Colonel Awaiti Ojok added, "The Uganda liberation forces have captured Kampala today. The lying, racist, fascist regime is no longer in power." Kampala was largely undefended at dawn when hundreds of Tanzanian troops swarmed into the capital from the west and the south and, as one officer was quoted as saying, "We had it under our control before anyone knew about it." Tanzanian Army troops marched into Kampala, the capital of Uganda, accomplishing the objective of the Uganda–Tanzania War to drive out Ugandan President Idi Amin. Amin fled eastward to Uganda's second largest city, Jinja and made phone calls to various Arab nations in an unsuccessful attempt to have foreign troops make a counterattack.
- Baseball's short-lived Inter-American League, one of the highest level minor leagues, with an AAA classification, made its debut as a six-team circuit with franchises in four nations, with the Miami Amigos and the Puerto Rico Boricuas of the U.S., the Caracas Metropolitanos and Petroleros de Zulia of Venezuela, the Santo Domingo Azucareros (Dominican Republic) and the Panama Banqueros. In the inaugural game in Panama City, Panama defeated Miami, 6 to 5. The IAL would last for only two months before disbanding.
- Born: Josh Server, American TV actor; in Highland Park, Illinois

== April 12, 1979 (Thursday) ==
- The Australian film Mad Max, which would inspire a host of post-apocalyptic sci-fi action films, as well as propelling U.S.-born and Australian-raised actor Mel Gibson to international fame, was first released, premiering in cinemas in Australia.
- U.S. Coast Guard Lieutenant (junior grade) Beverly Kelley became the first woman to command a United States military vessel of any branch of the service, taking command of the 95-foot (29 m) Coast Guard patrol boat USCGC Cape Newagen. She would retire in 2006 with the rank of captain.
- Born:
  - Claire Danes, American TV and film actress, multiple Emmy Award and Golden Globe winner; in New York City
  - Jennifer Morrison, American TV and film actress and director; in Chicago

== April 13, 1979 (Friday) ==
- Broadcast television made its debut in the nation of Sri Lanka (formerly Ceylon) as the TN Channel went on the air.
- Commandos sent by Rhodesia killed 10 people and injured 12 others in a raid on the capital of neighboring Zambia, destroying several buildings in the city of Lusaka in an attempt to kill Joshua Nkomo, the leader of the Zimbabwe African People's Union (ZAPU) guerrilla organization.
- Yusuf Kironed Lule was sworn in as the 4th President of Uganda after being transported by the government of Tanzania from Dar es Salaam to Kampala, succeeding Idi Amin, who had fled the capital before it was captured by Tanzanian troops in the Uganda–Tanzania War. Lule would serve only 68 days before being deposed by vote of the 30-members National Consultative Committee on June 20.
- The National Museum of Cambodia reopened for the first time in four years, under the authority of the Vietnamese-sponsored Cambodia in the aftermath of the overthrow of the Khmer Rouge government. After the fall of Phnom Penh in 1975, the museum was closed by the revolutionary government, and although its collection was not destroyed, most of its staff at the time was killed as part of the Khmer Rouge purge of intellectuals.
- The La Soufrière volcano erupted on the island of Saint Vincent in St. Vincent and the Grenadines. Although its 1902 eruption had killed 1,680 people on Saint Vincent, there were no casualties from the 1979 eruption because of an advance warning of the likelihood of eruption and an evacuation of people in the area.
- The Voyager 1 space probe, launched from the U.S. by NASA in 1977, concluded its observations of the planet Jupiter, and its course was realigned by ground controllers at the Johnson Space Center in Houston to send the probe onward toward the planet Saturn, where it would arrive in 1980.

== April 14, 1979 (Saturday) ==
- What started in Liberia as a peaceful protest march in Monrovia, over an 18% increase in the price of rice, became what is now known in Liberian history as the "Rice Riots". A group of 2,000 activists of the Progressive Alliance of Liberia marched toward the Executive Mansion, residence of Liberia's President William Tolbert, and were joined by more than 10,000 other people along the way, who turned the event into a 12-hour riot in which 40 civilians were killed and more than 500 injured, and US$40,000,000 of private property was destroyed. President Tolbert was granted emergency power for twelve months and, in the wake of the governmental repression that followed the riots, would be assassinated in the overthrow of his government on April 12, 1980, almost exactly a year after the riots.
- Twenty-eight coal miners were killed in an accident in Jeongseon, South Korea, and 40 others injured in that nation's worst coal mining disaster. Explosives being carried down into an underground mine shaft ignited while being transported by a work crew, causing a roof collapse that trapped 120 other miners who were rescued alive.
- The government of Nigeria announced that the first democratic elections in 15 years in the west African nation would take place in July, with voting for the 95-member Senate on July 7 and for the 449-member House of Representatives on July 14.
- Born: Pierre Roland, Indonesian TV actor; in Jakarta

== April 15, 1979 (Sunday) ==
- A 7.2 magnitude earthquake struck the Montenegro socialist republic in Yugoslavia as well as parts of Albania along the Adriatic Sea and killed at least 200 people in Yugoslavia and 35 in Albania. The tremor, strongest recorded in Yugoslavia's 60-year history, struck at 7:20 in the morning local time. More than 80% of the buildings were damaged and destroyed in villages around the Bay of Kotor, including Herceg Novi and Ulcinj. Many of the victims were killed in the collapse of the Hotel Agava in the Montenegrin resort city of Bar.
- Born: Luke Evans, Welsh singer and actor, in Pontypool

== April 16, 1979 (Monday) ==
- Robbers armed with M-16 rifles made a commando style raid on the Purolator Security Company in Waterbury, Connecticut, killing three guards and taking over $1.2 million in cash, but passed up $15 million of negotiable securities.
- Trustees of the United States Social Security Administration submitted a report to the U.S. Congress saying that there was sufficient money collected and expected to be collected to keep payment of retirement benefits and disability benefits until at least the year 2029. Stanford G. Ross, the Social Security Commissioner, said at a press conference that "The system is financially sound for well past the turn of the century" for at least 50 years, but added, "However, there is a long-term financing problem."
- Jane Byrne became the first woman to serve as mayor of a major American city, taking the oath of office as the 41st Mayor of Chicago.

== April 17, 1979 (Tuesday) ==
- The Oakland A's had one of the smallest home crowds in a major league baseball game in the 20th century when only 653 people came to the nearly 50,000-seat Oakland–Alameda County Coliseum on a cold and windy evening to see them beat the Seattle Mariners, 6 to 5. The smallest of record happened on September 22, 1966, at New York's Yankee Stadium, when only 413 people came to the 65,000-seat venue to see the last-place New York Yankees lose to the Chicago White Sox, 4 to 1.
- Born: Sung Si-kyung, South Korean singer and actress

== April 18, 1979 (Wednesday) ==
- As many as 100 schoolchildren between the ages of 8 and 16 years old were murdered after being arrested in four different areas of the city of Bangui, capital of the Central African Empire, on orders of Jean-Bédel Bokassa, who had declared himself Emperor Bokassa the First. The investigating human rights group Amnesty International revealed the massacre on May 14, and reported that the students had been charged with throwing stones at government cars, including Bokassa's limousine, in the course of protests against being required since January to purchase school uniforms from the CAE government at high prices. Hundreds of children identified as offenders were incarcerated at the national prison at Ngarangba in the Haute-Kotto prefecture, and 100 died, before Bokassa announced the next day that the survivors were to be released. The CAE's Ambassador to France confirmed reports on May 22 and, in his resignation speech in Paris, said, "I cannot give exact figures, but 100 would not be an exaggeration."
- Leonid Brezhnev, already the de facto leader of the Soviet Union as General Secretary of the Soviet Communist Party, was formally elected to a five-year term in his other position as the de jure head of state as Chairman of the Presidium of the Supreme Soviet, by a unanimous vote of the 1,500 deputies of the Supreme Soviet. Brezhnev, who in 1977 had filled the remainder of the term of Nikolai Podgorny after Podgorny's removal from office, would not live to complete his new term of office, dying three and a half years into his term on November 10, 1982.
- Major Saad Haddad, commander of the South Lebanon Army during the Lebanese Civil War and a Maronite Christian leader, proclaimed the "Free Lebanon State" in the area controlled by his Army, with a capital in the city of Marjayoun. The territory, nicknamed "Haddadland" by his detractors, was not recognized as a legitimate state by any nation, but did serve for Israel as the Lebanese side of the South Lebanon Security Belt during Israel's involvement in the war, patrolled jointly by Israeli troops and Haddad's troops. After Haddad's death in 1984, the area would come back under control of Lebanon.
- The crash of a New York Airways helicopter shuttle permanently ended operations for the 25-year-old company, which had carried passengers from New York's LaGuardia Airport to and from other airports, including the John F. Kennedy International Airport (JFK) airport and the Newark Airport. One of the service's Sikorsky S-61L helicopters lost a tail rotor blade shortly after Flight 972 took off from Newark to JFK, plunging 150 feet (46 m) and killing three people, while seriously injuring 13 others.
- Born: Kourtney Kardashian, American TV personality and model; in Los Angeles

== April 19, 1979 (Thursday) ==
- What was, at the time, the world's largest cinema, opened as the Toronto Cineplex, an 18-screen complex and the first of the new Cineplex company.
- Voters in Egypt overwhelmingly approved the creation of a bicameral parliament, multi-party elections, and the new peace treaty with Israel.
- Born:
  - Kate Hudson, American film actress; in Los Angeles
  - Antoaneta Stefanova, Bulgarian chess grandmaster and Women's World Champion 2004 to 2006; in Sofia
- Died:
  - Fred Ruiz Castro, 64, Chief Justice of the Supreme Court of the Philippines since 1976, died while on an official trip in India
  - Vladimir Khatuntsev, 62, Soviet journalist and general director of the Soviet news agency TASS
  - Esengül (stage name for Esen Agan), 24, popular Turkish singer and actress, died in a traffic accident in the Istanbul suburb of Ataköy
  - Wilhelm Bittrich, 85, convicted Nazi war criminal and Waffen-SS commander who had carried out the execution of 17 members of the French Resistance during the German occupation of France in World War II

== April 20, 1979 (Friday) ==
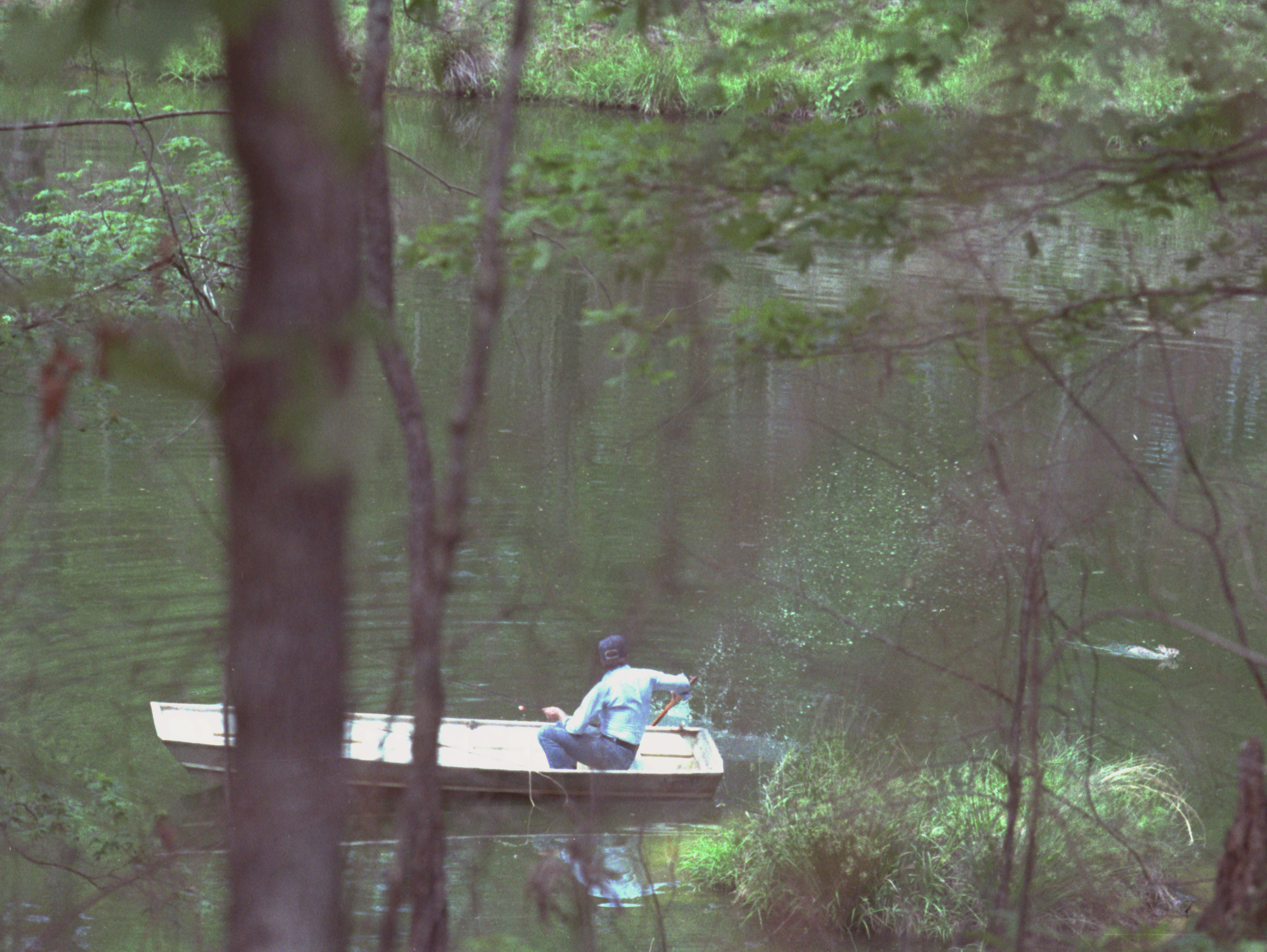
April 20, 1979: Carter (in boat) and the rabbit

- The legend of a "killer rabbit" trying to attack Jimmy Carter, then the President of the United States, began when Carter was fishing from a boat and a swamp rabbit swam toward him during a weekend in Georgia, causing him to react. The incident, a picture of which was taken by the White House photographer, went unnoticed by the press until four months later, when U.S. Press Secretary Jody Powell mentioned it to Associated Press reporter Brooks Jackson, who then publicized it, to the amusement of comedians worldwide. Powell would write in his memoir that while it was unclear whether the rabbit was berserk, it was "obvious... that this large, wet animal, making strange hissing noises and gnashing its teeth, was intent upon climbing into the Presidential boat."

== April 21, 1979 (Saturday) ==
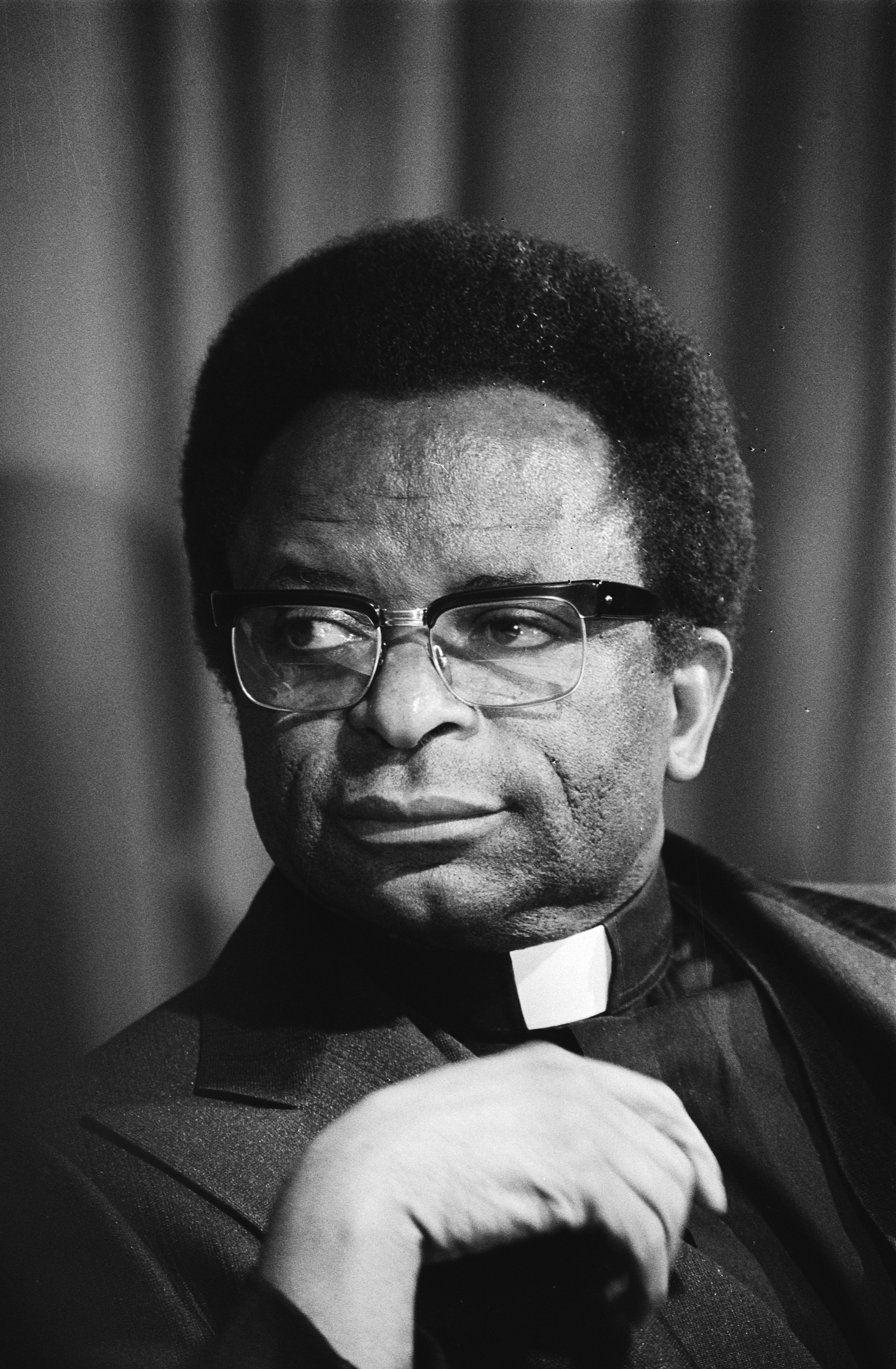
Muzorewa

- Voting was completed in Zimbabwe Rhodesia for the 72 seats reserved for black African candidates in the 100-member biracial House of Assembly. The United African National Council (UANC), led by Methodist bishop Abel Muzorewa, won 51 of the 72 seats, giving the UANC an absolute majority in the House of Assembly and making Murzorewa the first black Prime Minister of Zimbabwe. Voting for the 20 seats for white Rhodesians had taken place on April 10.
- Born: James McAvoy, Scottish film actor; in Glasgow

== April 22, 1979 (Sunday) ==
- Elections were held in Thailand for the 301 seats of the unicameral Ratthasapha, the national parliament. With opposition parties failing to win sufficient seats to challenge the Prime Minister, General Kriangsak Chamanan, there was no change in the government, which had briefly suspended martial law during the election campaign. The Social Action Party, led by former Prime Minister Kukrit Pramoj, won 83 seats, more than any other party, but Pramoj said that he had no plans to attempt to form a coalition.
- All universities were ordered closed in the Asian kingdom of Nepal after student rioting that had spread nationwide after beginning on April 5 as a demonstration in front of the Pakistani embassy in Kathmandu. Dissatisfaction with the high cost of education and the restrictive rules for students led to demands by students for reforms. Some demands were granted, including the abolition of college entrance examinations and permission to form student government unions independent of college administration. After more than four weeks, and the dismissal of the controversial Minister of Education, the government would permit the reopening of schools on May 22.
- Forty-four passengers were killed on a stalled train in Pakistan, and 37 others injured, when a locomotive crashed into the back of the rear cars.
- Tanzanian Army troops captured Jinja, the second-largest city in Uganda, 11 days after having captured the Ugandan capital of Kampala.
- The Albert Einstein Memorial was unveiled at The National Academy of Sciences in Washington, D.C., with a 12-foot (3.7 m) high statue of the famous physicist. Created by sculptor Robert Berks at a total cost of $1.6 million, the statue was unveiled 39 days after the centennial of the March 14, 1879 birth of Einstein, and featured the physicist sitting down and holding a plaque "etched with the equations of his three most important theories." Sculptor Burks told reporters that the concept was "You are inside his head. What is inside? The whole universe."
- Born: Daniel Johns, Australian singer-songwriter and guitarist (Silverchair), in Newcastle, New South Wales)

== April 23, 1979 (Monday) ==
- In Ecuador, SAETA Airlines Flight 011 departed from Quito and flew south on what was expected to be a 50-minute flight to Cuenca, and disappeared along with its 52 passengers and five crew. The plane was the third Ecuadorian airline flight, in less than three years, to vanish on a flight over the Andes; on August 15, 1976, another SAETA Flight 011 on the same route had disappeared. The wreckage of the Vickers Viscount turboprop would be found almost five years later, on February 24, 1984, in the Andes Mountains in the Pastaza Province, where it had impacted a hillside at 18,000 feet (5,500 m) after being almost 30 miles (48 km) off course.
- The government of Argentina arrested 20 labor union leaders who had called for a one-day strike in protest against the military government's economic policies after the group had gathered at the Labor Ministry building in Buenos Aires. The leaders "were seized by armed plainclothesmen... and driven away in unmarked cars" in advance of the planned April 27 strike.
- Died: General Mohammad-Vali Gharani, 66, the first Chief of Staff of the Iranian Army to be appointed by the Ayatollah Khomeini, was assassinated by three gunmen in Tehran. General Gharani, a friend of Khomeini, had resigned on March 27 after being accused of oppression against Kurdish nationalists in Iran and was the victim of a home invasion.

== April 24, 1979 (Tuesday) ==
- A proposal by U.S. President Jimmy Carter, to give the federal government the authority to bar the sale of gasoline on Saturdays and Sundays, was overwhelmingly rejected at the committee level by the bipartisan U.S. House of Representatives Commerce Committee, with only 15 members in favor and 26 against. Congressman John Dingell of Michigan, who sponsored the legislation, commented that "The signs do not augur well for approval of gasoline rationing," which the Commerce Committee would reject the next day.
- Died: Volodymyr Ivasyuk, 30, Soviet Ukrainian poet and songwriter, disappeared in Lvov. His body was found more than three weeks later, hanging from a tree limb in a forest on the outskirts of the Ukrainian city.

== April 25, 1979 (Wednesday) ==
- The Egypt–Israel peace treaty went into legal effect at 5:27 in the afternoon local time (1527 UTC) as the instruments of ratification were exchanged between Israeli delegate Eliyahu Ben-Elissar and Egypt's Undersecretary of State, Saad Afra, at a ceremony at the American border station at Um Khashiba in the Sinai peninsula. The exchange officially implemented the countdown to Israel's complete withdrawal from the Sinai by April 25, 1982.
- Born: Andreas Küttel, Swiss ski jumper, 2008 world champion; in Einsiedeln

== April 26, 1979 (Thursday) ==
- The government of India's Prime Minister Morarji Desai announced that the nation's constitution would be amended for a nationwide ban against the slaughter of cattle, after 84-year-old Hindu religious leader Vinoba Bhave had started a hunger strike five days earlier. Among Hindus, who comprised 80 percent of India's population, the consumption of beef from cows or bulls is unacceptable and cattle are limited to breeding and providing dairy products. At the time, the laws on beef production were left to the then 22 states of India and the nine union territories; and only the states of Kerala and West Bengal — permitted the slaughter of cattle, and even the two states limited beef production to cows at least 14 years old and no longer productive. The proposed amendment for a nationwide ban did not pass, and Bhave died in 1982.

== April 27, 1979 (Friday) ==
- The Soviet Union released five prominent dissidents from imprisonment in exchange for two convicted Soviet spies who had been captured in the United States. Aleksandr Ginzburg, Eduard Kuznetsov, Mark Dymshitz, Georgi Vins and Valentyn Moroz were all deprived of their Soviet citizenship and taken to Moscow where they were sent on a flight to New York. Upon the arrival of the five dissidents in New York, the U.S. allowed the two Soviet spies— Valdik A. Enger and Rudolf P. Chernyayev—
- The Vietnam Veterans Memorial Fund was created as a non-profit organization with the goal of raising funds for the construction of what would become the Vietnam Veterans Memorial in Washington, D.C.
- A sniper shot 40 people who were watching a parade in San Antonio, Texas, including five police officers, and fatally wounded two civilians before killing himself as police closed in on him. Ira Atterbury, a 64-year-old Texan, parked a motor home at the southeast intersection of Broadway and East Grayson Street, where the annual Fiesta Parade was to begin, and began shooting at random bystanders about 30 minutes before the event was scheduled to start. An autopsy concluded that Atterbury had been under the influence of the narcotic PCP (phencyclidine piperidine, known also as "angel dust").
- John Michael "Ozzy" Osbourne was fired from the heavy metal band Black Sabbath for his unreliability related to substance abuse, and would go on to greater success in a solo career.
- Died:
  - Phan Huy Quat, 71, Prime Minister of the State of Vietnam (1954) and later Prime Minister of South Vietnam (1965), died of liver failure in the Chí Hòa Prison in Ho Chi Minh City, where he had been held captive since shortly after the 1975 Fall of Saigon
  - Brian Field, 42, co-conspirator in Britain's "Great Train Robbery" of 1963, was killed in a car collision on the M4 motorway along with five other people.

== April 28, 1979 (Saturday) ==
- The Indian state of Goa, at the time the union territory of Goa, Daman and Diu, was placed under President's rule.
- In the U.S. state of Indiana, mass murderer Steven Judy kidnapped and murdered Terry Lee Chasteen and her three young children, all preschoolers. On March 9, 1981, he would be put to death in the electric chair, becoming the first person since 1961 to be executed by the state of Indiana.
- Born: Bahram Radan, Iranian film actor; in Tehran

== April 29, 1979 (Sunday) ==
- Piloted by designer Larry Mauro, the Solar Riser made the first flight by a crewed solar-powered aircraft when it took off from Rubidoux, California, reaching an altitude of 40 feet (12 m) and flying about half a mile (0.8 km).
- Jaime Roldós Aguilera was elected President of Ecuador in a runoff election held between the two candidates receiving the most votes in the presidential primary of July 16, 1978. Roldós, who had defeated Sixto Durán Ballén by a little more than 50,000 votes in the primary, had a more than 500,000 vote defeat of Durán, winning by a 2-to-1 margin. The election also selected the members of the new, 69-seat unicameral Congress.
- Lol Mahamat Choua took office as the fourth President of Chad, as chairman of the Transitional Government of National Unity (GUNT or Gouvernement d'Union Nationale de Transition), a coalition of the leaders of the various factions in the civil war in the northern African republic. Choua, leader of the Rally for Democracy and Progress party, would serve a little more than four months before being overthrown.
- The Times, London's oldest daily newspaper, was blocked from resuming publication for the first time in five months, after coming to an agreement with printers in Frankfurt, West Germany, to publish "a series of weekly overseas editions" that would be distributed in the United Kingdom. The National Graphical Association, the British labor union for printers and leaders of the 1978 strike against The Times, had made its own agreement with its West German counterpart, the IG Druck and Papier union, which sent demonstrators to occupy the building where printing was to have taken place.

== April 30, 1979 (Monday) ==
- An Israeli freighter, the Ashdod, became the first-ever ship from Israel to traverse Egypt's Suez Canal, the 100 mi (160 km) link between the Mediterranean Sea and the Red Sea (and by extension, the Indian Ocean). The canal had been closed to ships from Palestine since the founding of Israel in 1948, until April 25, when the treaty between the two nations took effect and guaranteed that Israeli ships "shall enjoy the right of free passage" through the canal. For more than 30 years, Israeli vessels were required to sail around Africa in order to reach Israel from the Indian Ocean. The Ashdod entered the canal from the Red Sea at 8:25 a.m. local time (0625 UTC) as part of a convoy of 32 ships from various nations and reached the Mediterranean 14 hours later.
