= March 1979 =

Month of 1979

<<	March 1979					>>
Su	Mo	Tu	We	Th	Fr	Sa
				1	2	3
4	5	6	7	8	9	10
11	12	13	14	15	16	17
18	19	20	21	22	23	24
25	26	27	28	29	30	31

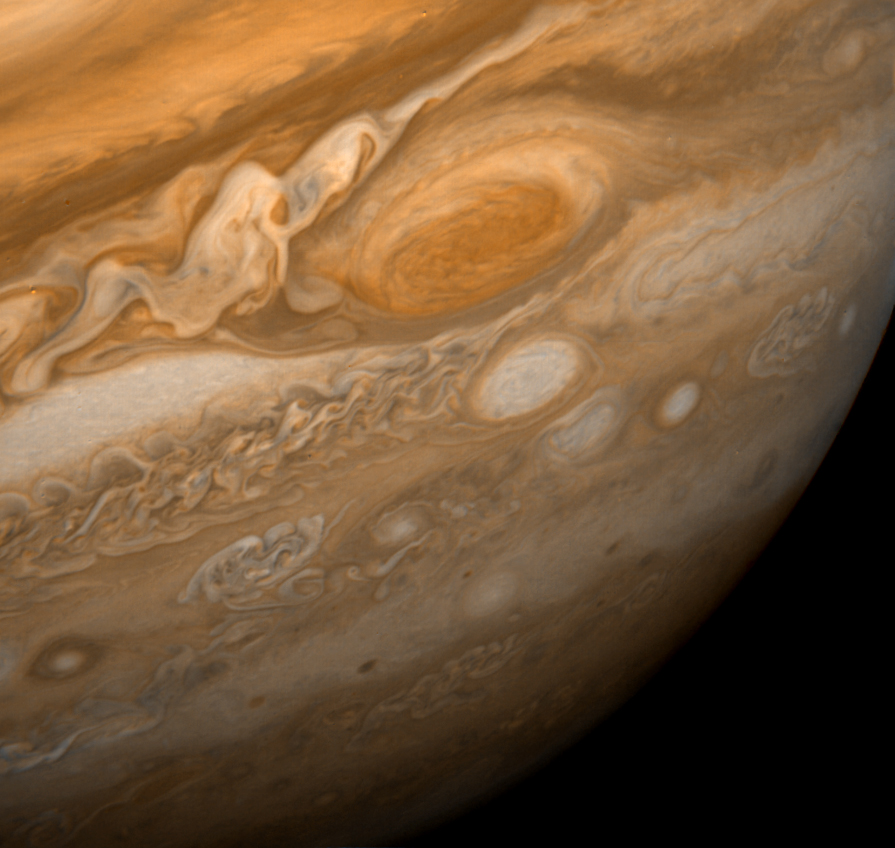
March 26, 1979: Voyager 1 makes humanity's closest approach to Jupiter

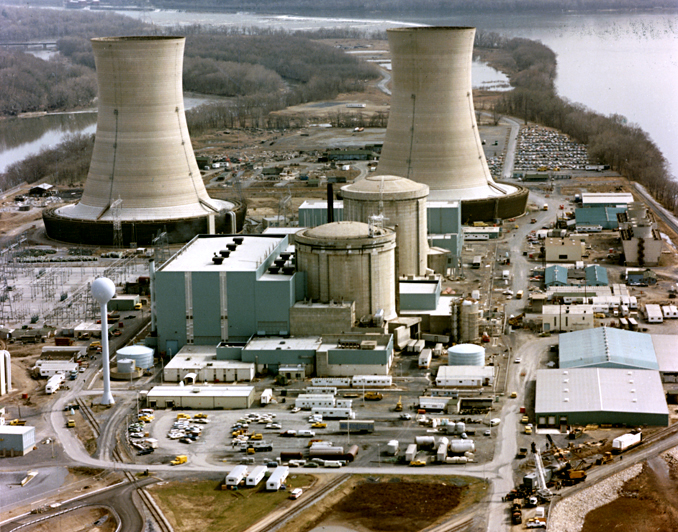
March 28, 1979: Three Mile Island nuclear reactor meltdown happens in U.S. state of Pennsylvania

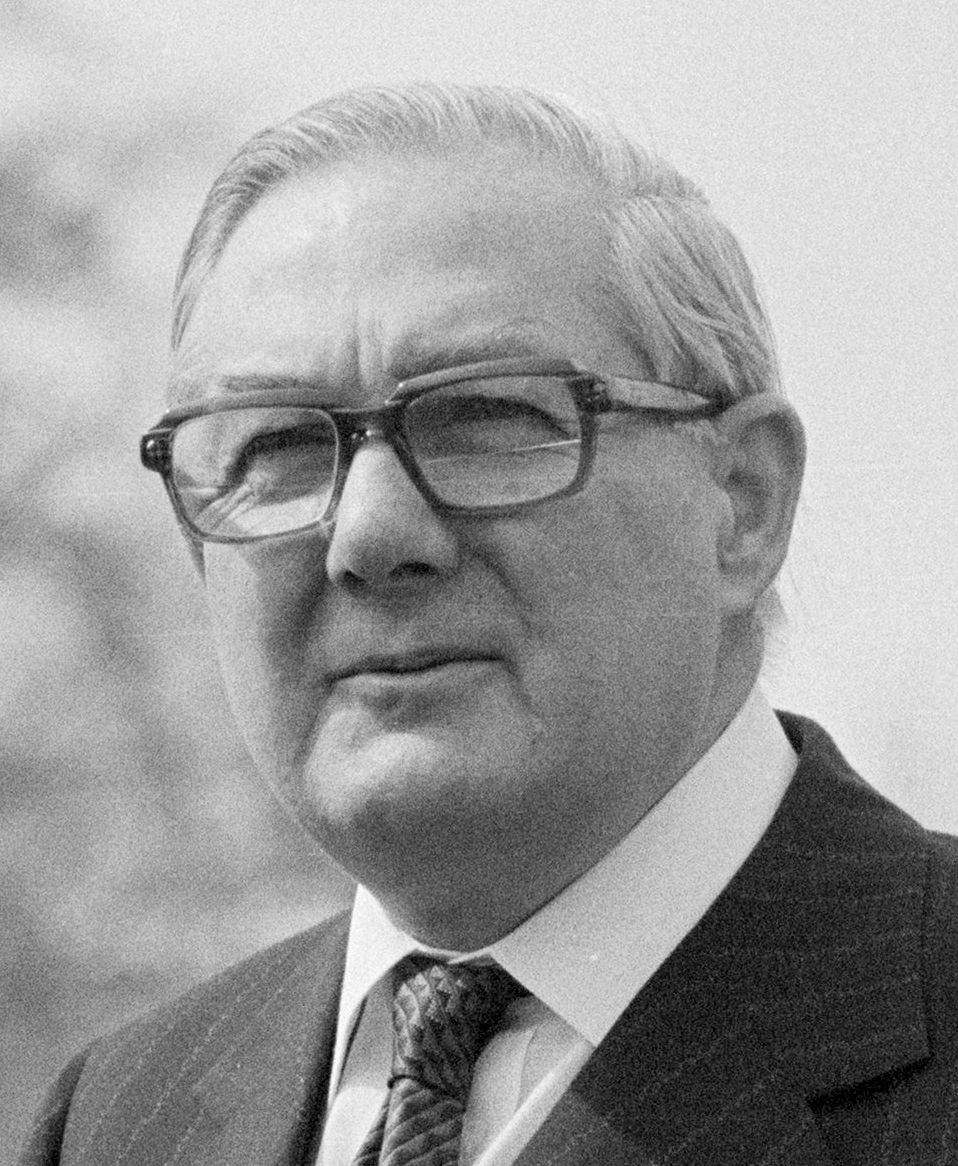
March 28, 1979: British Prime Minister Callaghan loses "no confidence" motion by one vote, 311 to 310

The following events occurred in March 1979:

== March 1, 1979 (Thursday) ==
- Voters in Scotland and in Wales considered the question of whether either constituent part of the United Kingdom should have a greater level of self-government. Voters in Wales rejected the proposal for devolution outright, 20% to 80%, and although more voters in Scotland favored rather than opposed the measure, there was insufficient turnout for at least 40% of eligible voters to support the resolution. The result was that 51.6% supported the proposal, but with a turnout of 64%, this represented only 32.9% of the registered electorate. The Scotland Act 1978 did not have sufficient support among the Scottish electorate. This was an act to create a devolved deliberative assembly for Scotland. An amendment to the Act stipulated that it would be repealed if less than 40% of the total electorate voted "Yes" in the referendum.
- Voting was held in Spain for the two houses of the national parliament, the Cortes. The Unión de Centro Democrático party of Prime Minister Adolfo Suárez won 168 of the seats in the 350-member Chamber of Deputies (seven short of a majority) and an absolute majority of 119 seats in the 208-member Senate.
- Sweeney Todd: The Demon Barber of Fleet Street, a macabre Broadway musical about murderous barber Sweeney Todd, with music and lyrics by Stephen Sondheim, made its debut with a first performance at the Uris Theatre.

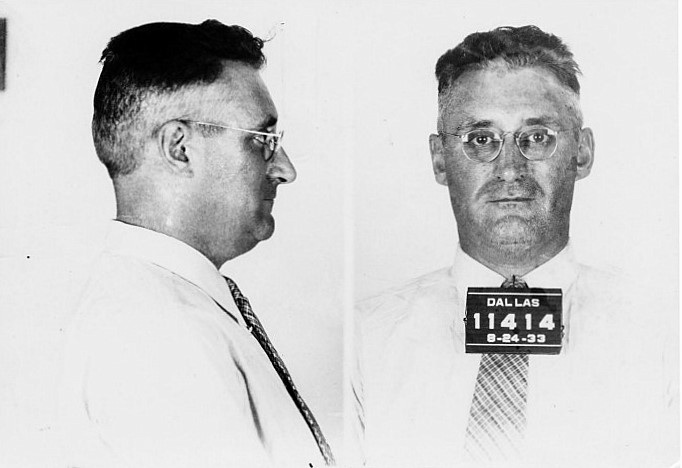
Harvey Bailey

- Died:
  - Harvey Bailey, 91, American bank robber who stole more than one million dollars between 1921 and 1933, then stayed in federal prison until 1964; he later wrote an autobiography titled Robbing Banks Was My Business.
  - Dewey F. Bartlett, 59, former Governor of Oklahoma and U.S. Senator, died of lung cancer.
  - Mustafa Barzani, 75, Kurdish leader who led armed fighting against both Iran and Iraq for a self-governing Kurdish homeland, died of lung cancer in an American hospital.
  - Dolores Costello, 75, American film actress known for The Sea Beast and The Magnificent Ambersons, grandmother of Drew Barrymore
  - Stefan Frenkel, 76, Polish-born violinist, academic and composer, died of a heart attack.

== March 2, 1979 (Friday) ==
- The film Norma Rae, a drama based on a true story about labor union activist Crystal Lee Sutton, had its premiere, released nationwide in the U.S. by 20th Century Fox and starring Sally Field in the title role.
- Born: Aleksandar Obradović, Serbian whistleblower who revealed corruption and fraud within the Serbian government-owned defense contractor Krušik corporation; in Valjevo, SR Serbia, Yugoslavia

== March 3, 1979 (Saturday) ==
- Italian downhill skier Leonardo David was fatally injured during an FIS Alpine SKI World Cup race at Lake Placid, New York. David, an 18-year-old rookie, had won his first World Cup race less than a month earlier on February 7 at Oslo, and was less than 100 metres (330 ft) from the end of the 3,028 m (9,934 ft) course when he lost control, fell, and "spun several times and slid through the finish line". He got back up, walked over to his team coach and collapsed while bending down to take off his skis. He never regained consciousness and would remain in a coma until his death on February 26, 1985.
- Died: Harry P. Cain, 73, controversial U.S. Senator for Washington from 1946 to 1953, died of complications from emphysema.

== March 4, 1979 (Sunday) ==
- Previously unknown to astronomers, rings were discovered around the planet Jupiter by Voyager 1, the U.S. space probe.
- Pope John Paul II issued his first encyclical, Redemptor hominis (The Redeemer of Man), setting out the goals for his pontificate and proposed solutions for contemporary human problems. In the first paragraph, titled "At the close of the second Millennium", the Pope wrote that "this time...is already very close to the year 2000. At this moment it is difficult to say what mark that year will leave on the face of human history," but added that "it will be the year of a great Jubilee" that "will recall and reawaken in us in a special way our awareness of the key truth of faith which Saint John expressed at the beginning of his Gospel."
- Yes-or-no elections were held in the Soviet Union for the Communist Party nominees in each electoral district for the official parliament, the Supreme Soviet of the USSR. Voting was mandatory for all eligible citizens, who were each presented with the name of the Communist candidate for the 750-member Soviet of Nationalities and the 750-member Soviet of the Union.
- Died:
  - Jamil Baroody, 73, Saudi Arabian delegate to the United Nations, died of cancer.
  - Willi Unsoeld, 52, American mountain climber and member of the first U.S. team to scale Mount Everest, was killed in an avalanche along with a member of a 12-student expedition from Evergreen State College while descending Mount Rainier in the U.S. state of Washington.

== March 5, 1979 (Monday) ==
- The New York Times and the Los Angeles Times adopted the Pinyin system of spelling Chinese names that had been implemented on January 1 by the government of the People's Republic of China for English-language press releases. Since the start of the century, the Times had used the Wade–Giles system. Among the updates revisions were "Beijing" for "Peking" and "Deng Xiaoping" for "Teng Hsiao-ping", as well as China's Xinhua News Agency itself, formerly "Hsinhua".
- MetrôRio, the first underground subway in Brazil's largest city, Rio de Janeiro, was opened with the inauguration of a 3.2 mi (5.1 km) segment linking the neighborhoods of Gloria and Cidade Nova.
- Voyager 1 made its closest approach to Jupiter, coming within 172,000 miles (277,000 km) of the largest planet in the Solar System.
- SGR 0525−66, the first astronomical object to be detected from Earth as a "soft gamma repeater" — a neutron star that emits large bursts of gamma-ray and X-ray radiation at irregular intervals— was observed by two Soviet space probes and, 11 seconds later, by a U.S. probe, Helios 2 as all Earth-launched instruments were hit by a large blast of gamma radiation at approximately at 1551 UTC. The radiation was believed to be a magnetar giant flare, the first identified, from near LMC N49, a remnant of the supernova of a star in another galaxy, the Large Magellanic Cloud, an estimated 163,000 light-years from Earth.
- Died: Alan Crofoot, 49, Canadian operatic tenor, jumped to his death from the fifth floor of a hotel in Dayton, Ohio.

== March 6, 1979 (Tuesday) ==
- The People's Republic of China announced that it had started withdrawing troops from Vietnam after 17 days of war. The cost of the three-week Sino-Vietnamese War to Vietnam was the destruction of bridges, roads, provincial hospitals and the electrical power grid in the Lao Cai, Lang Son and Cao Bang provinces.
- Voters in the U.S. Virgin Islands overwhelmingly rejected a proposed constitution that would have provided limited self-government for the U.S. territory. Out of a little more than 10,000 voters, less than 44 percent approved the proposal for an elected governor and territorial legislature.
- Died: Charles Wagenheim, 83, American actor, was beaten to death by his caregiver, Stephanie Boone, after a confrontation with her for forging checks.

== March 7, 1979 (Wednesday) ==
- Operation Rekstok, a series of South African raids in Angola against bases of the South-West Africa People's Organization (SWAPO) as part of the South African Border War, took place in coordination with a simultaneous raid by the South African Defence Force into Zambia against the People's Liberation Army of Namibia (PLAN), Operation Saffraan.
- World Team Tennis (WTT), which had operated for five seasons, suspended further operations after one of its two remaining teams folded. During summer of 1978 season, WTT had competed with 10 franchises that each played a 44-game schedule. During the off-season, however, teams dropped out of the league, one by one, and after January, only the Phoenix Racquets and the Golden Gaters of San Francisco were still operating. Citing economic problems, Phoenix announced that it would go out of business. The Golden Gaters, the only team left in the WTT, announced later in the day that, since "they had been left with no opposition", they "were forced to conclude that there would not be a season" in 1979. WTT would return in 1981 with a shorter schedule.
- Died:
  - Andres Figueroa Cordero, 54, one of four Puerto Rican terrorists who entered the U.S. Capitol on March 1, 1954, and shot five U.S. Representatives during a session of Congress, died of cancer in his hometown of Aguada, Puerto Rico, a little more than six months after his release from federal prison.
  - Lei Chen, 81, former government minister of the Kuomintang Party government in mainland China and later in Taiwan, who later became an opposition leader and was jailed for 13 years for sedition.
  - Guiomar Novaes, 84, Brazilian concert pianist, died after a heart attack.

== March 8, 1979 (Thursday) ==
- Britain's Aerospace Developments AD500 airship, the prototype for the Skyline 500, was damaged in a storm after heavy winds prevented it from being taken into its hangar. The AD500 had made its maiden flight only 33 days earlier, on February 3.
- The office of Prime Minister of Algeria was re-established after having been disbanded in 1963. Interior Minister Mohamed Ben Ahmed Abdelghani was named by President Chadli Bendjedid to the position.
- Thousands of women participated in the International Women's Day Protests in Tehran, 1979, against the introduction of mandatory veiling during the Iranian revolution.
- Died: Richard C. Meredith, 41, American science fiction author, died of a cerebral hemorrhage, three months before the publication of his last novel, The Awakening.

== March 9, 1979 (Friday) ==
- The Dutch electronics corporation Philips publicly demonstrated a prototype of what would become known as "a 'CD'", a compact disc that stored digital audio, at a press conference in Eindhoven.
- Using data from the Voyager space probe, astronomer Linda A. Morabito discovered evidence of volcanic activity on Io, one of the moons of Jupiter.
- Died:
  - Barbara Mullen, 64, American-born actress active in the United Kingdom, died of a heart attack.
  - Jean-Marie Villot, 73, French Roman Catholic Cardinal and Secretary of State for the Vatican since 1970, died of bronchial pneumonia.

== March 10, 1979 (Saturday) ==
- An estimated 15,000 women and girls walked off their jobs and left schools to march in protest against the restriction of rights and privileges under the new Shi'ite Islamic regime, defying calls by the Ayatollah Khomeini that they should wear the chador to comply with Shia beliefs regarding female modesty. Although women continued in professional work, by 1981, restrictions on female wardrobe would be put into place and continue until the death of Khomeini in 1989.
- Born:
  - Danny Pudi, American comedian and TV actor known for the series Community; in Chicago
  - Masato Kobayashi, Japanese professional kickboxer; in Kashiwa, Chiba

== March 11, 1979 (Sunday) ==
- The Battle of Lukaya, a turning point in the ongoing Uganda–Tanzania War, occurred at Lukaya, when the Ugandan Army was decisively defeated by Tanzanian troops and had its war making ability crippled. The victory gave Tanzanian troops and Ugandan rebels a key bridge across the Katonga River, and removed the chief geographic obstacle standing in the way of the capital, Kampala, 60 miles (97 km) away.
- The first competition of the new Championship Auto Racing Teams (CART) organization, which had been founded by racing team owners dissatisfied with the United States Auto Club, was held as the first of 12 races in its 1979 series. Conducted at Phoenix International Raceway at Avondale, Arizona, the "Arizona Republic/Jimmy Bryan 150" was won by Gordon Johncock.
- Iran formally withdrew from the CENTO (the Central Treaty Organisation), its alliance with the United Kingdom, Pakistan and Turkey. Pakistan followed the next day and CENTO, reduced to an alliance between two members of NATO, disbanded by the end of the month.
- Died:
  - Victor Kilian, 88, American film and TV actor, was beaten to death by burglars at his home in Hollywood. Kilian and his fellow actor, Charles Wagenheim (who had been murdered five days earlier), had recently acted in an episode of the TV show All in the Family. The episode was aired on March 20, 1979, nine days after Kilian's death.
  - Charlie Wiggins, 81, African-American auto racer during the 1920s and 1930s, from injuries sustained more than 40 years earlier in 1936.
  - Rallapalli Ananta Krishna Sharma, 86, Indian scholar and noted composer of Carnatic music

== March 12, 1979 (Monday) ==
- Mello Yello was introduced by The Coca-Cola Company as a caffeinated, citrus-flavored soft drink to compete with PepsiCo's Mountain Dew.
- Luis Herrera Campins was inaugurated to a five-year term as President of Venezuela, after winning the presidential election held on December 3.
- Stig Bergling, an officer of Sweden's national investigative agency RPS/Säk (now SÄPO), was arrested at the Tel Aviv airport by Israel's spy agency, the Shin Bet, after being identified by his superiors as a spy for the Soviet GRU. After being turned over to Sweden, Bergling was sentenced to life imprisonment, but would escape in 1987.
- Three brothers — Linwood, James and Anthony Briley — began a series of random home invasions and murders that terrorized the city of Richmond, Virginia, and its suburbs over a period of more than seven months, starting with their attempt to burn a married couple to death. On March 21, they would kill the first of 11 victims, a vending machine salesman.
- Died:
  - Ralph Emerson, 66, American botanist
  - Mashiur Rahman, 54, Bangladeshi Minister of Railways, Roads and Highways, died suddenly after being appointed Prime Minister of Bangladesh by President Ziaur Rahman to the newly recreated post.
  - Angus G. Wynne, 65, American businessman and theme park developer, died of a heart attack.

== March 13, 1979 (Tuesday) ==
- Maurice Bishop led a successful coup in the South American island nation of Grenada while Prime Minister Eric Gairy was out of the country at the United Nations. After Gairy had flown to New York, Bishop led an attack on the police barracks and the broadcast studios of Radio Grenada, and Deputy Prime Minister Herbert Preudhomme persuaded the police to surrender by 4:00 in the afternoon. After ruling for more than three years as leader of Grenada's People's Revolutionary Government, Bishop would be deposed by his deputy prime minister, Bernard Coard, then executed by a firing squad, after which the United States would invade the island to remove Coard from office.
- The new European Currency Unit (ECU) came into use after France agreed to link the value of its monetary currency, the franc, to the currencies of West Germany, Belgium, Luxembourg, the Netherlands, Ireland and Denmark. It replaced the European Unit of Account (EUA) at parity in 1979, and would later be replaced by the euro on January 1, 1999.
- Alia Royal Jordanian Flight 600 crashed, killing 45 of the 64 people on board, when it flew into a thunderstorm while attempting a landing in Qatar and a downdraft caused the aircraft to drop 750 feet (230 m).
- Michael Prokes, a survivor of the Jonestown Massacre in Guyana, committed suicide during a press conference in Modesto, California. Prokes called a press conference in a Modesto motel room. Eight reporters attended. After reading a statement, Prokes excused himself, went into the bathroom, and shot himself in the head with a .38 revolver. His suicide note ended with the words, "If my death doesn't prompt another look at what brought about the end of Jonestown, then life wasn't worth living anyway."
- Born:
  - Ben Faulks, Welsh actor, the host and title character in children's television show Mr Bloom's Nursery; in Truro
  - Johan Santana, Venezuelan baseball pitcher and two-time Cy Young Award winner; in Tovar Municipality, Mérida
- Died:
  - Per Hækkerup, 63, Danish politician and diplomat
  - Mahmoud Jafarian, 50, Iranian broadcaster and former director of the Pars News Agency for the Shah of Iran, was executed by firing squad after a brief hearing by the Islamic Revolutionary Court, along with the former news director for Iran's national television and radio network, Parviz Nikkhwah.

== March 14, 1979 (Wednesday) ==
- A CAAC Trident airplane crashed into a factory near Beijing, killing 32 people on the ground and all 11 people on the airplane.
- Thirty people were burned to death and 22 others seriously injured in Greece, in a collision between a Greek bus and a Yugoslavian tanker hauling gasoline. The disaster took place north of Evzonoi in central Macedonian Greece, near the border crossing to Bogorodica in the SR Macedonia of Yugoslavia.
- At the Geneva Airport in Switzerland, a prisoner exchange took place between the nation of Israel and the Popular Front for the Liberation of Palestine (PFLP), with Israel releasing 76 Palestinians from multiple organizations in exchange for Israeli Army private Abraham Amram, who had been held captive in Lebanon for almost a year. In an arrangement made by the Swiss-based International Committee of the Red Cross, Private Amram (who had been captured on April 5, 1978) was flown from Damascus, Syria, to Geneva on a Balkan Bulgarian Airlines Tu-154, and 60 Palestinian men and six women were flown to Geneva on an El Al Boeing 707. Ten other Palestinians elected to stay in the occupied West Bank.
- Born: Ellie Greenwood, Scottish distance runner who held the record for fastest 100 km run for a woman; in Dundee.
- Died:
  - Frank McEncroe, 70, Australian food manufacturer, credited with inventing the Chiko Roll in 1951
  - Charles Stevenson, 70, American analytic philosopher

== March 15, 1979 (Thursday) ==
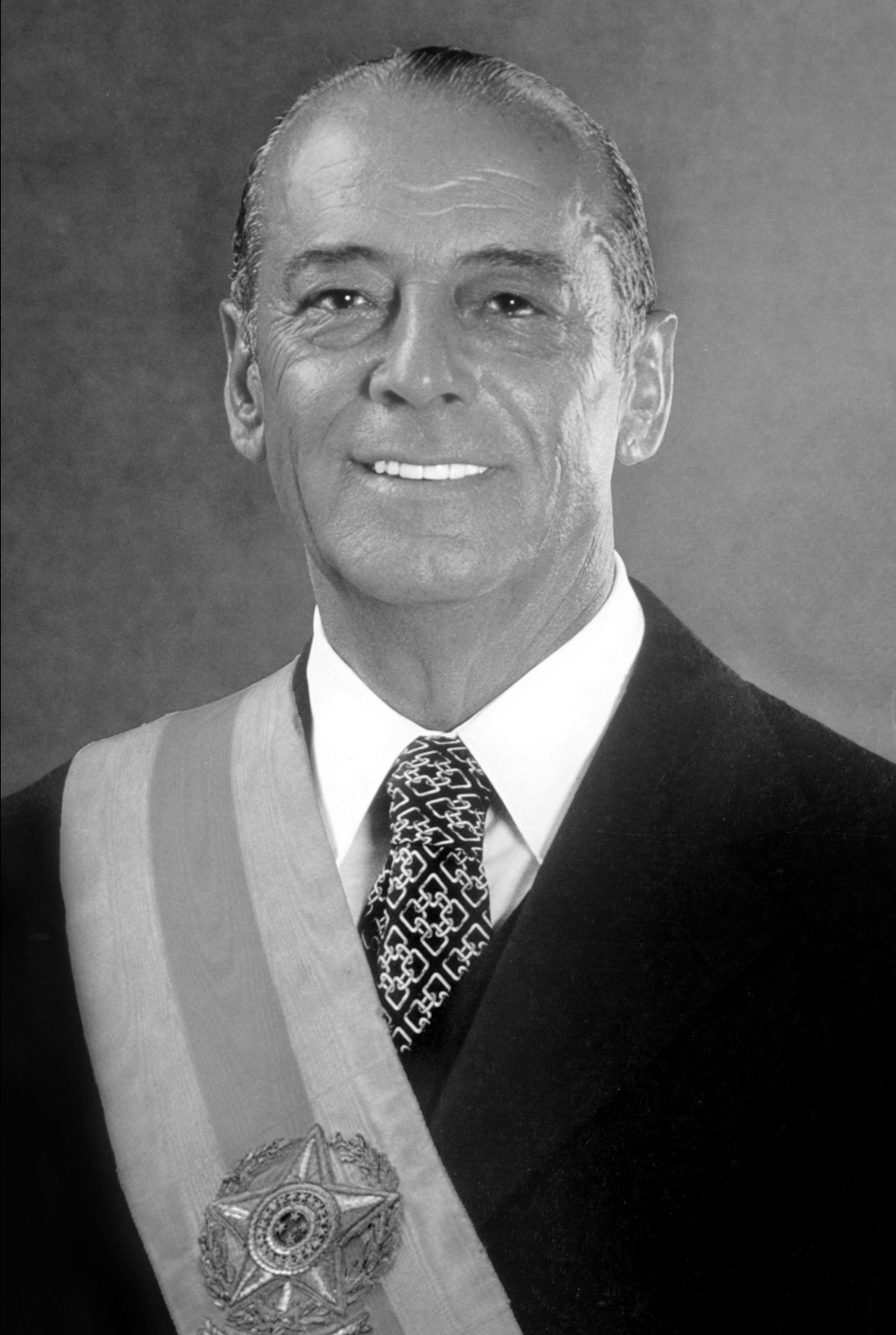
Figueiredo

- General João Figueiredo was inaugurated to a six-year term as the 30th President of Brazil and would serve until 1985 during which the South American nation would make the transition to having civilian government after more than 20 years of military rule.
- An insurrection of Muslim extremists in Afghanistan began in the city of Herat after the preaching by mullahs to thousands who wanted a revolution similar to that which had happened in Iran.
- At the Iranian city of Qom, two thousand members of the Iran Scout Organization were addressed by the Ayatollah Khomeini at the Feizieh School, who told them "You dear ones, must keep up your enthusiasm. You must guard your movement."
- The oil tanker MV Kurdistan broke in two after striking an ice field off the coast of the Canadian province of Nova Scotia and spilled 6,000 tons of oil. The tanks in its stern section remained intact and the remaining 16,000 tons of oil were offloaded after the wreckage was towed to Sept-Iles, Quebec.
- The U.S. x-ray telescope satellite High Energy Astronomy Observatory 1 (HEAO-1), launched on August 12, 1977, fell from orbit and burned up on re-entry into Earth's atmosphere. During its operation, it scanned electromagnetic radiation above all areas on Earth three times.
- Born:
  - Jason Crow, American politician, U.S. representative for Colorado's 6th congressional district, in Madison, Wisconsin
  - Kevin Youkilis, American baseball player, winner of the 2008 Hank Aaron Award in the American League; in Cincinnati

== March 16, 1979 (Friday) ==
- Major hostilities between China and Vietnam in the Sino-Vietnamese War came to an end as Chinese troops withdrew.
- The Central Treaty Organisation (CENTO) disbanded after only two members, the United Kingdom and Pakistan, remained.
- Habib Elghanian, a Tehran businessman and the most prominent member of Iran's Jewish community, was arrested by the new government and charged with espionage for Israel. On May 8, he was found guilty of multiple crimes after a 20-minute hearing, sentenced to death, and executed by a firing squad the next day. Elghanian was the first of 17 Jewish leaders to be executed on accusations of espionage. Of more than 80,000 Jews living in Iran at the time of the Islamic Revolution, the vast majority would emigrate from the country to the U.S. and Israel, and less than 10,000 would remain forty years later.
- The film The China Syndrome, about an accident at a nuclear reactor and a subsequent cover-up, was released in U.S. theaters nationwide. Produced by and starring Michael Douglas, along with Jane Fonda and Jack Lemmon, the film came out only 12 days before the most significant nuclear power plant accident in U.S. history
- Died:
  - Jean Monnet, 90, French diplomat and proponent of a European Union as co-founder (in 1952) and first president of the European Coal and Steel Community
  - Minerva Pious, 75, Russian-born American film, television and radio actress known for the role of Mrs. Nussbaum on The Fred Allen Show

== March 17, 1979 (Saturday) ==
- Fifty-seven passengers and a stewardess were killed, out of 119 people on board Aeroflot Flight 1691, which crashed shortly after its takeoff from Moscow's Vnukovo Airport on a flight to Odessa. While the Soviet Union's government-owned press acknowledged that the Tupolev Tu-104 airliner had crashed on takeoff and that there were "some casualties", it provided no details.
- Nottingham Forest, the defending Football League champion, defeated Southampton, 3 to 2, to win the Football League Cup.
- Born: Stormy Daniels (stage name for Stephanie Clifford), American pornographic actress involved in a legal dispute with U.S. president Donald Trump in 2018; in Baton Rouge, Louisiana
- Died:
  - Jerome G. Ambro, 81, American lawyer and politician, former member of the New York State Assembly
  - Walter D. Binger, 91, American civil engineer and historical preservationist
  - Giacomo Lauri-Volpi, 86, Italian operatic tenor, died of a cerebral blood clot.

== March 18, 1979 (Sunday) ==
- Parliamentary elections concluded in Finland for the 200 seats in the Eduskunta, bringing an end to the minority coalition government led by Prime Minister Kalevi Sorsa of the Social Democratic Party (SDP). With the SDP losing two seats and the National Coalition Party (the Kokoomus) of Harri Holkeri gaining 12, Sorsa would be unable to form a new government and would be replaced in May by Holkeri.
- Ten miners died in a methane gas explosion at Golborne Colliery near Wigan, in England.
- American driver Buddy Baker won the Atlanta 500 Grand National stock car race at Atlanta International Raceway. During the race, driver Dave Watson's car spun out of control on pit road, striking and killing 18-year-old crewman Dennis Wade. Watson withdrew from the race.
- Died:
  - Max Hayward, 54, British translator and expert on Russian literature, died of cancer.
  - Gardner Murphy, 83, American psychologist and parapsychologist

== March 19, 1979 (Monday) ==
- C-SPAN, the Cable-Satellite Public Affairs Network, an American cable channel focusing on government and public affairs, went on the air with a live broadcast of a session of the U.S. House of Representatives, starting with a speech by then-Congressman Al Gore of Tennessee.
- Born: Hidayet "Hedo" Türkoğlu, Turkish professional basketball player with 15 seasons in the NBA and one in the EuroLeague; in Istanbul
- Died:
  - Al Hodge, 66, American radio and TV actor known for playing the title role in the science fiction TV program Captain Video and in the radio program The Green Hornet, died of heart failure due to chronic bronchitis and emphysema.
  - Ida Rolf, 82, American biochemist, creator of the pseudoscientific alternative medicine practice of "Rolfing"
  - Richard Beckinsale, 31, English television actor and comedian known for being the co-star of the BBC programmes Porridge and its sequel, Going Straight, died of a heart attack. At the time, Beckinsdale had filmed five episodes as the star of an upcoming BBC television programme, Bloomers.

== March 20, 1979 (Tuesday) ==
- In a sign of the rapid growth in China of privately owned vehicles, the capital at Beijing activated the first automatic traffic lights in the Communist nation, setting up nine timer-controlled traffic signals at intersections on the busiest road in the city. While the time between signals was relatively long— "2 minutes and 10 seconds during rush hour"— the upgrade was an improvement over the manually operated signals that had been "controlled by policemen who sometimes waited 10 minutes to change them."
- Afghanistan's leader Nur Muhammad Taraki met with Soviet premier Alexei Kosygin to request Soviet Army ground troops to protect his government's security.
- Lutz Eigendorf, midfielder for the East German soccer football team BFC Dynamo, defected to West Germany while his team was in Giessen following a friendly match (an exhibition game) against 1. FC Kaiserslautern.
- Died:
  - Carmine Pecorelli, 51, Italian investigative journalist, was shot to death in Rome, a crime for which Prime Minister Giulio Andreotti was tried and acquitted.
  - Ruth Finney, 81, American journalist
  - Winton C. Hoch, 73, American chemist and cinematographer who contributed to the development of the Technicolor process in film

== March 21, 1979 (Wednesday) ==
- Anthropologist Mary Leakey announced the earliest known evidence, up to that time, of bipedalism in hominids, the evolutionary ancestral line of homo sapiens, based on the discovery of two pairs of footprints left in hardened volcanic ash. Presenting her findings at a press conference at the National Geographic Society headquarters in Washington D.C., Dr. Leakey said that the new findings showed that hominids walked, upright, 500,000 years earlier than previously believed and the development in hominids made it possible for the hands to be freed for tool-making and other activities, commenting "All modern technology stems from this single development." The find of the footprints "was the first in the history of science to provide direct evidence of physical activity by humankind's apelike ancestors, changing previously held assumptions about primates."
- Born: Melissa Gorga, American TV personality on The Real Housewives of New Jersey; as Melissa Ann Marco in Toms River, New Jersey

== March 22, 1979 (Thursday) ==
- Two gunmen shot and killed the UK Ambassador to the Netherlands, Sir Richard Sykes, 58, as he was preparing to enter a car to be driven from his home in The Hague to the British Embassy. The assassins also killed Karel Straub, an embassy employee who was holding the car door open for Sykes. The Irish Republican Army would later claim responsibility for the attack and gave as its motive that Sykes "had been engaged in intelligence operations against our organisation", apparently for authoring a report on the 1976 assassination of the British Ambassador to Ireland, Christopher Ewart-Biggs.
- National Hockey League (NHL) owners voted, 14 to 3, to approve a partial merger with the rival World Hockey Association (WHA), bringing an end to the WHA and absorbing four of its six franchises (the Edmonton Oilers, Winnipeg Jets, Quebec Nordiques and New England Whalers). The other two WHA teams, the Cincinnati Stingers and the Birmingham Bulls, folded at the end of the season. An earlier vote of 12 to 5, taken on March 8, failed because it lacked the 75% majority by a single vote.
- Israel's parliament, the Knesset, voted 95 to 18 to authorize Prime Minister Menahem Begin to sign the negotiated peace treaty with Egypt.
- Died: Manuel Colom Argueta, 44, Guatemalan leftist politician and Mayor of Guatemala City, was shot to death, along with two of his bodyguards, as he was being driven to his office. Colom, leader of the Front of Revolutionary Unity (Frente Unido de la Revolución, or FUR) and a foe of Guatemala's right-wing military government, had registered his organization as a political party.

== March 23, 1979 (Friday) ==
- Chad's President Felix Malloum resigned six weeks after a civil war broke out between his supporters and those of Prime Minister Hissene Habre. Malloum was replaced by an eight-member governing counsel chaired by Goukouni Oueddei.
- In a professional basketball game that took 135 days to complete, the Philadelphia 76ers defeated the visiting New Jersey Nets, 123 to 117, after NBA Commissioner Larry O'Brien had ordered a replay of the last 17 minutes and 50 seconds of a game that had started on November 8, 1978. The Nets had protested a referee's call of three technical fouls (and the free throw attempts that followed) on player Bernard King and head coach Kevin Loughery, in a game that the 76ers had won, 137 to 133, based on scores that should not have been allowed (the rule being that only two technical fouls can be called on a person, the second of which results in ejection from the game). The replayed game resumed with the score 84 to 81 in favor of the 76ers and 5:50 remaining in the third quarter. Because of a player trade between November and March, three players— Eric Money, Ralph Simpson and Harvey Catchings— played for both teams. Money is the only NBA player to score for both sides in the same game, having 23 points for the Nets in November and 4 for the 76ers in March.
- Born: Mark Buehrle, American baseball pitcher known for pitching a perfect game in 2009; in St. Charles, Missouri
- Died: Philip Bourneuf, 71, American character actor on stage, film, and TV

== March 24, 1979 (Saturday) ==
- Murray MacLehose, the British Governor of Hong Kong, made the first official visit to the People's Republic of China by a governor of the British colony, after being invited by Chinese Vice Premier Deng Xiaoping. At the time, the United Kingdom had a little more than 18 years left on its lease of the 400 sq mi (1,000 km^{2}) territory, expiring on June 30, 1997. Governor MacLehose would return to Hong Kong 11 days later as one of the first passengers on the reopened Kowloon–Canton Railway.
- The first fully functional Space Shuttle orbiter, Columbia, was delivered to the Kennedy Space Center, arriving on the Shuttle Carrier Aircraft, to be prepared for its first launch.
- Died:
  - Sir Jack Cohen, 80, English grocer who founded the Tesco chain of supermarkets in 1919.
  - Chic Anderson, 47, American horse racing sportscaster, died of a heart attack.

== March 25, 1979 (Sunday) ==
- Blackrock, located in Ireland's County Cork, became the first hurling team to win three Gaelic Athletic Association championships, defeating Ballyhale Shamrocks of County Kilkenny by two points, each team scoring five goals (worth three points each), with extra points determined by a shot going above the goal crossbar and between the goal posts. The final score of the title match was 5–7 to 5–5 (22 to 20).
- The single recording "King Tim III (Personality Jock)" was released on the Spring Records label by the Fatback Band and is cited by some sources as the first recorded hip hop music song on a 45 rpm single, although "King Tim III" did not chart on Billboard magazine's Top 40 bestsellers.

== March 26, 1979 (Monday) ==
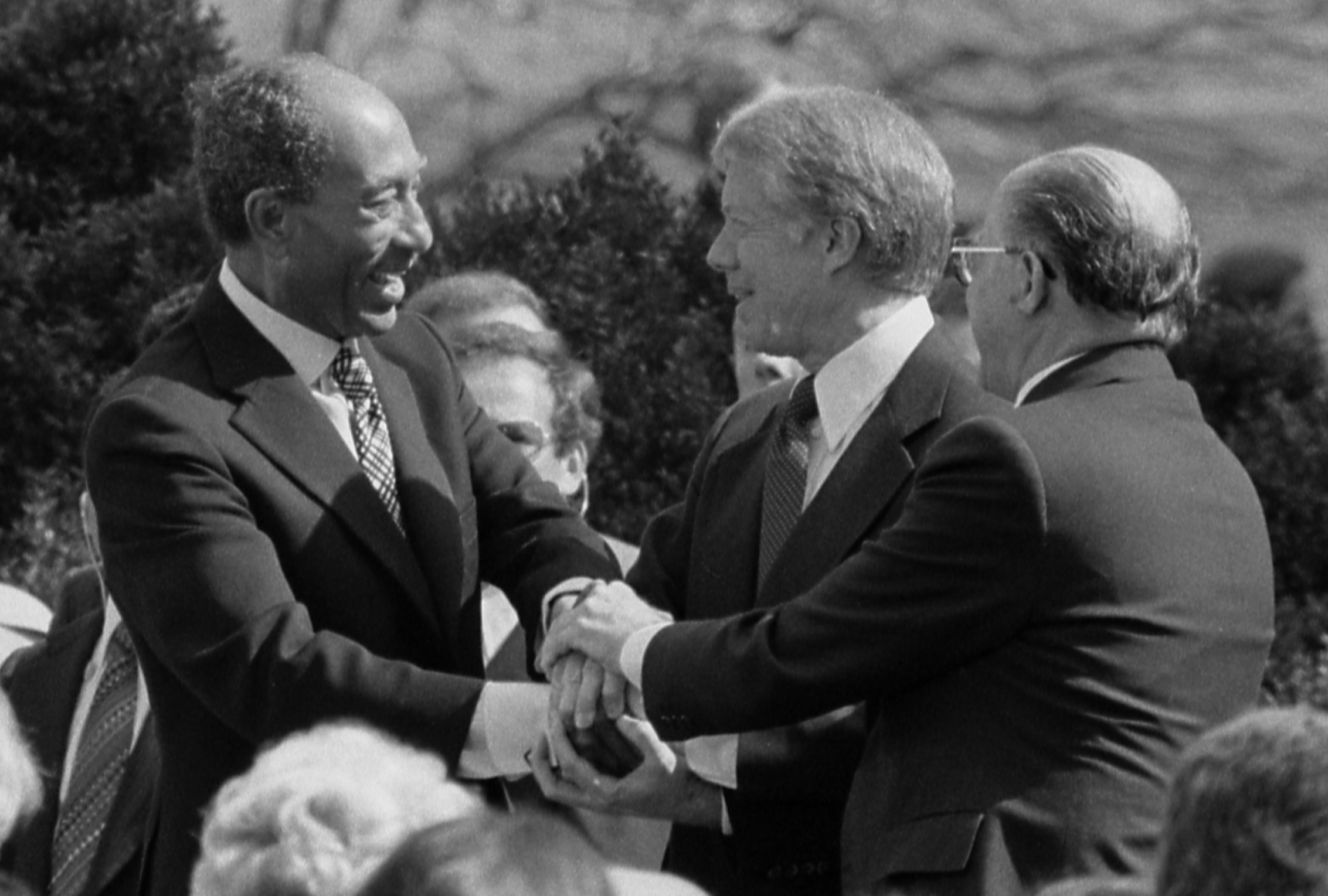
Sadat, Carter and Begin at the treaty signing

- Following negotiations moderated by U.S. President Jimmy Carter, Egypt's President Anwar Sadat and Prime Minister Menachem Begin of Israel signed the Egypt–Israel peace treaty at the White House, with Israel agreeing to withdraw its forces from the Sinai Peninsula over a period of three years, and Egypt giving diplomatic recognition to the State of Israel.
- Michigan State University, led by Earvin "Magic" Johnson, defeated Indiana State, led by Larry Bird, 75–64, to win the NCAA basketball championship.
- Canada's Prime Minister Pierre Trudeau dissolved the House of Commons and called for nationwide elections to be held on May 22.

== March 27, 1979 (Tuesday) ==
- Hafizullah Amin was named as the new Prime Minister of Afghanistan, after the nation's ruling Communist organization, the People's Democratic Party of Afghanistan (PDPA), took away the powers of PDPA general secretary Noor Mohammad Taraki, who was relieved of running the government but retained as the ceremonial President.

== March 28, 1979 (Wednesday) ==
- America's most serious nuclear power plant accident occurred, at Three Mile Island, adjacent to Middletown, Pennsylvania, near the state capital at Harrisburg, with a partial meltdown and destruction of the TMI-2, one of the nuclear reactors at the plant. At about 4:00 in the morning local time, a relief valve in the coolant system on the pressurizer in TMI-2 opened and got stuck, causing reactor coolant to leak out for the next two hours. Control room operators misinterpreted the readings and turned off the automated emergency cooling system, and by the time an emergency was declared at 6:48 a.m., (1148 UTC), two-thirds of the 12 foot (3.7 m) reactor core had been exposed and high radiation levels existed in several areas of the plant. Although later studies concluded that there had been no increase in incidents of cancer among two million people living in the central Pennsylvania area, it would take more than 14 years and over one billion dollars to complete the cleanup of the contamination. By 1990, radioactive waste from the wreckage of the reactor had been transported to Idaho for storage at the National Engineering Laboratory of the U.S. Department of Energy, and the removal of the 2.23 million gallons of tritium-contaminated radioactive water inside TMI-2 had required the use of an electric evaporation system to convert the liquid into steam to be gradually released".
- British Prime Minister James Callaghan and his coalition Labour Party government lost a vote of no confidence by one vote, as the resolution "that this House has no confidence in Her Majesty's Government" passed, 311 to 310. Margaret Thatcher, the Leader of the Opposition and of the Conservative Party, made the motion. One Labour MP, Sir Alfred Broughton, was hospitalized with a terminal illness and unable to vote in Callaghan's favor, and an offer by Conservative MP Bernard Weatherill to abstain in light of Broughton's absence was declined by the Labour MP who had asked for an abstention as part of a tradition of "pairing". Broughton died five days later. Parliament was dissolved the next day and Callaghan announced the setting of a general election to be held on May 3.
- An unidentified Russian man, with a hand grenade strapped to his body, entered the United States Embassy in Moscow at 2:30 in the afternoon after being escorted inside by an embassy official, Robert W. Pringle, whom he had met outside. Once in the waiting room, the man demanded that he be granted a visa so that he could emigrate from the Soviet Union. After five hours of unsuccessful negotiations, the Moscow city police stormed the Embassy with a barrage of tear gas and gunfire, and at 10:46 p.m., the man pulled the pin on the grenade and died in the explosion.
- Died: Emmett Kelly, 80, American clown in circus, television and film

== March 29, 1979 (Thursday) ==
- Eleven people were killed in the crash of Quebecair Flight 255, a turboprop Fairchild F-27, at the Quebec City airport. The plane, with 24 people on board, fell after taking off on a flight to Montreal.
- British Prime Minister James Callaghan announced that elections for the House of Commons would be held on May 3.
- Died:
  - Sultan Yahya Petra of Kelantan, 61, Head of State of Malaysia as the Yang di-Pertuan Agong since September 21, 1975, died 18 months prior to the end of his five-year term. He would be replaced on April 26 by Sultan Ahmad Shah of Pahang.
  - Luke Easter, 63, retired American League and Negro National League baseball player for the Cleveland Indians and Homestead Grays, was shot and killed by two armed robbers outside a bank branch of the Cleveland Trust Company in Euclid, Ohio.

== March 30, 1979 (Friday) ==
- A two-day referendum on establishing an Islamic Republic and abolishing the monarchy began in Iran and continued through the next day, with all but 140,000 out of more than 20,000,000 voters declaring in favor of creating the republic.
- Romanian Prime Minister Manea Manescu was dismissed by vote of the Romanian Communist Party leadership, and was replaced by Ilie Verdet, a Communist hard-liner and a close associate of President Nicolae Ceausescu.
- Joachim Deckarm, a member of the West German national team handball squad, was left paralyzed from the neck down after being seriously injured in the semifinals of the European Handball Federation Cup Winners' Cup tournament. Deckarm was playing for VfL Gummersbach team against a Hungarian team, Tatabánya KC.
- Adolfo Suarez, the Prime Minister of Spain, won a vote of confidence in the Cortes, 183 to 149, on his plans to create a minority coalition government.
- Buck Rogers in the 25th Century, based on the iconic science fiction comic strip Buck Rogers that ran in newspapers from 1929 to 1967, was released nationwide as a film starring Gil Gerard in the title role. Although there were plans for a sequel about the astronaut, who woke up after more than 500 years in suspended animation, and the film would be panned by one critic who commented, "Get some sleep, Buck," the film would be successful enough to become a TV series on NBC.
- Died:
  - Gennady Komnatov, 29, Soviet Olympic champion road cyclist, was killed in a traffic accident.
  - Airey Neave, 63, a Conservative member of the British House of Commons, was assassinated by a car bomb as he was driving out of the underground parking garage for Parliament members and staff. The Irish National Liberation Army claimed responsibility for the killing of Neave, a close adviser to Conservative Party leader Margaret Thatcher.
  - José María Velasco Ibarra, 86, former President of Ecuador

== March 31, 1979 (Saturday) ==
- Malta declared what is now celebrated annually as "Freedom Day" (Jum il-Helsien) as the 179-year British military presence ended, with the departure of the Royal Navy from the Maltese Islands.
- The first known instance of the birth of a child conceived after the mother's uterus had been removed, and carried to term, took place in England at Musgrove Park Hospital, located in the town of Taunton. The mother, Mrs. Alison Trott of the village of Norton Fitzwarren in Somerset, had undergone a hysterectomy 11 months earlier, two months before Martin Trott's conception.
- At a meeting in Baghdad, the foreign ministers of 18 Arab nations and the Palestine Liberation Organization voted to sever all diplomatic and economic relations with Egypt in retaliation for its treaty with Israel.
- By a margin of a single vote, the newly organized government of Italy's Prime Minister Giulio Andreotti failed, 149 to 150, to win a test of confidence, prompting Andreotti and his cabinet to announce their resignation to President Sandro Pertini.
- Eight people were injured in the U.S. city of Decatur, Illinois, after three elephants escaped from a performance of the George Hubler International Circus at a high school gymnasium. A 17-year-old student who had struck one of the animals in the rear with a broom was believed to have caused the incident and was arrested and charged with disorderly conduct.
- Died: Ethel Ernestine Harper, 75, African-American teacher and actress best known for her portrayal of the advertising character "Aunt Jemima" and the model for the image of the trademarked symbol on the Quaker Oats line of pancake mixes and syrups.
