= Tractorcade =

Tractorcade was a 1978 and 1979 protest in Washington, D.C. by the American Agriculture Movement.

== Events ==
In January 1979, nearly 3,000 farmers drove their tractors to Washington, D.C., many of them from thousands of miles away. The Jimmy Carter administration agreed that the Farmers Home Administration would stop all foreclosures. Soon after the rally was over, the Home Administration resumed foreclosures of farms with past due loans.

On February 5, 1979, farmers arrived in Washington, D.C.; 17 tractors had been impounded. Police confined the tractors to the National Mall. They blocked traffic, creating significant tie-ups. A blizzard hit while they were in town, and then the tractors became useful as they were the only vehicles that could reliably travel through the snow, often delivering doctors and nurses to hospitals.

A group of Maryland farmers attempted to repair the damage to the Mall, by sowing grass seed.

Concern that traffic would be hopelessly tangled led DC area commuters to head to transit in record numbers. An estimated 277,000 trips were taken on February 5, breaking the single-day record set in early January and topping 250,000 trips for the first time ever. The record would last until the summer when the oil crisis caused an uptick in metro use.
