= Beverly Kelley =

American Coast Guard officer

Beverly G. Kelley
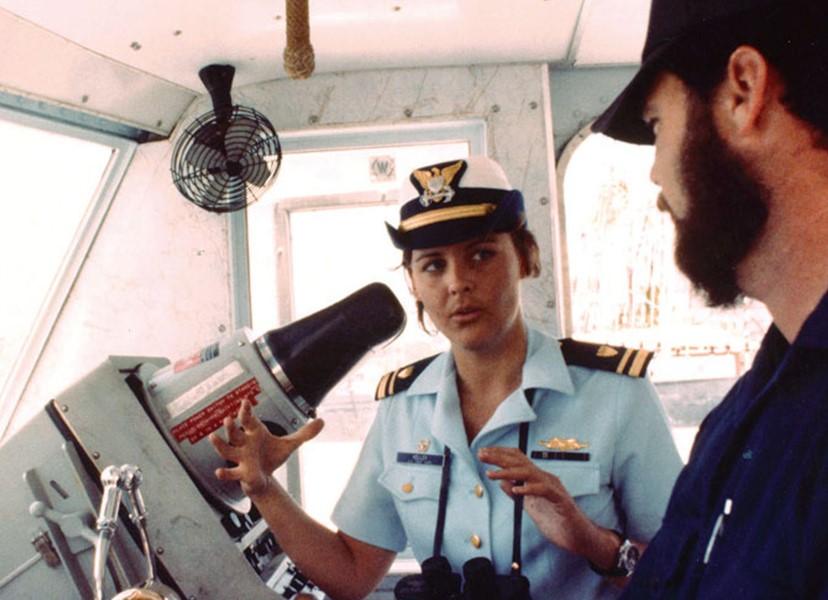
- Lt. (j.g.) Beverly Kelley on the bridge of USCGC Cape Newagen, c. 1979
- Born: June 26, 1952 (age 74)
- Allegiance: United States
- Branch: United States Coast Guard
- Service years: 1976–2006
- Rank: Captain
- Commands: USCGC Cape Newagen; USCGC Northland; USCGC Boutwell
- Awards: Meritorious Service Medal (3); Coast Guard Commendation Medal (3); Coast Guard Achievement Medal (2)

Beverly G. Kelley (born June 26, 1952) is a retired United States Coast Guard captain who was the first woman to command a U.S. military vessel.

== Background ==
Kelley was raised in Miami, Florida and graduated from the University of Miami with a bachelor's degree in mathematics. In January 1976 she enlisted in the United States Coast Guard and then attended Officer Candidate School in Yorktown, Virginia from February through June 1976. She earned her Master of Arts degree in national security and strategic studies from the Naval War College in Newport, Rhode Island and a Master of Science degree in national resource management from the Industrial College of the Armed Forces in Washington, D.C.

== Background ==
Kelley graduated from the Coast Guard's Officer Candidate School in 1976. Kelley was raised in Miami, Florida and graduated from the University of Miami with a bachelor's degree in Mathematics. In January 1976 she enlisted in the United States Coast Guard and then attended Officer Candidate School in Yorktown, Virginia from February through June 1976. She earned her Master of Arts Degree in National Security and Strategic Studies from the Naval War College in Newport, Rhode Island and a Master of Science Degree in National Resource Management from the Industrial College of the Armed Forces in Washington, D.C.

== Career ==
Kelley became the first woman to command an American military vessel of any branch of the service, specifically a Coast Guard cutter, the 95-foot patrol boat USCGC Cape Newagen, on April 12, 1979. In 1996, she was also the first woman to command a medium endurance cutter, USCGC Northland. In 2000, she became commander of a high endurance cutter, USCGC Boutwell, and made history as the first woman ever to do so. She retired on April 22, 2006 at the rank of captain.

== Later life ==
Kelley was appointed to an open seat on the Queen Anne's County Board of Education by Maryland Governor Martin O'Malley in 2011. She was elected to the seat in November 2012, re-elected in November 2016 and continued to serve through 2020. Kelley served as president of the board during the 2018–2019 school year. She was not a candidate for re-election in November 2020.

Kelley became a member of the Defense Department Advisory Committee on Women in the Services in March 2013 and continued to serve on the committee through 2016.

== Personal ==
Kelley is married to Kevin M. Tokarski, who is Associate Administrator for Strategic Sealift at the United States Maritime Administration of the Department of Transportation. The couple have one son.

== Honors ==
Her military decorations during her thirty years of service include:

- Three Meritorious Service Medals
- Three Coast Guard Commendation Medals
- Two Coast Guard Achievement Medals
- One Commandant's Letter of Commendation Ribbon
- Two Coast Guard Unit Commendation Awards
- Five Coast Guard Meritorious Unit Commendation Awards
- Two Joint Meritorious Unit Commendation Awards
- One Humanitarian Service Medal
