= Nikolay Sakharov =

Executed Soviet serial killer

- Born: Nikolay Alexandrovich Sakharov; 22 April 1954; Nepotyagovo, Vologda Oblast, RSFSR
- Died: 5 February 1979 (aged 24); RSFSR
- Cause of death: Execution by shooting
- Other names: "The Vologda Ripper" "The Vologda Chikatilo"
- Conviction: Murder with aggravating circumstances (3 counts)
- Penalty: Death

Details
- Victims: 3
- Span of crimes: January – December 1977
- Country: Soviet Union
- State: Vologda
- Date apprehended: 15 December 1977

Nikolay Alexandrovich Sakharov (Russian: Никола́й Алекса́ндрович Са́харов; 22 April 1954 – 5 February 1979), known as The Vologda Ripper (Russian: Вологодский потрошитель), was a Soviet serial killer, who became a figurant of one of the most high-profile trials in Vologda.

== Biography ==
Nikolay Sakharov was born in the village of Nepotyagovo in the Vologda Oblast, living with his mother Galina Alexandrovna, a collective farm worker. His father, a participant and disabled veteran, died early. At school, Sakharov was a disciplined boy, but was bad at studying. He was also a member of the Komsomol from 1969 to 1975. After eighth grade, Sakharov graduated from the Kubensky SPTU, working as a tractor driver in the state farm "Prigorodny", after which he served in the army. From 1974 to 1975, he worked as a policeman in the special detention centre of the Vologda Internal Affairs Directorate, where he was fired "for his connection with the arrested". He could not find work in Selhoztechnik for a long time, after which he changed many times. Later he began to work as a prison supervisor but was dismissed on 25 October 1977, for discipline violations. At the same time, Sakharov discovered how to attract women, and had many mistresses. He was also married, but not for long. His ex-wife said that she had divorced him because of his jealousy, and Sakharov himself did not hesitate to have sex with other women, not hiding his infidelity.

The first rape and murder he committed occurred in January 1977, which spread rumours, fear and panic in the city. Girls began disappearing without a trace: in total, 5 cases of missing girls were recorded. People in the city exaggerated the number of victims, saying that dozens had disappeared, which increased the hysteria. The police did not want this to go on for a long time, and created a special investigative group headed by the senior investigator of the regional prosecutor's office, Vladimir Dorofeev. Sakharov knew that they were looking for him, but this did not stop his thirst to kill, with the last disappearance occurring in November in the village of Maisky. There were witnesses who saw the girl get into a Moskvich-403, which was the first important clue. Lookouts were organized around the roads, and on December 15, Sakharov was arrested by a patrol police car.

On 25 January 1978, Sakharov confessed to the murder of three girls (Tatyana Svetina, Natalia Vinogradova and Marina Mukhina). Having a car, he scoured in search of victims around the city and the surrounding area. If he met a lonely young girl on the road, he offered her a ride, most often dressed in a police uniform. When the girl got into the car, he took her out of town, into the woods, raped her (according to his confession, he raped two of the girls, but the third he could not), killing them by hitting them with a hammer, driftwood or tuning key. Then Sakharov burned the corpses, shattering the skulls with a big stick, wrapping the remains in a rag and throwing them into the river. The remains of two of his victims were thrown into the Pelshma River, but he burned the corpses in the forest near Kadnikov. He stole a watch and handkerchief from the second victim, giving them to one of his mistresses, and from the third - a cross and "chain of yellow metal", which he gave to another mistress. This chain, seized during the investigation, also helped convict the offender.

In February 1978, he tried to escape from prison, but was prevented from doing so.

=== Trial ===
From 18 to 25 July 1978, a court was held in Vologda. The judge in the case was well-known Vologda lawyer Yuri Koshkin. Together with Sakharov at the dock were three of his accomplices. They committed a series of thefts with him, but none participated in the murders. Even before the trial there was an agreement with the escort regiment on the allocation of special protection and reinforced police outfits. In the city, there was talk that the population was aroused, and a lynching could occur. In those days, crowds of people went to the courthouse. The participants of the trial and the judges could enter the building with great difficulty. On the porch, speakers were installed (an unprecedented case at the time). Through them, people were urged to keep calm and not to interfere in the process. At the trial, Sakharov detailed all his crimes, fully admitting his guilt and asking the court not to sentence him to death. However, the request was denied, and Nikolay Sakharov was executed by firing squad on 5 February 1979.

=== In the media ===
- Documentary film from the series "The investigation was conducted..." - "In bed with a murderer"

== See also ==
- List of Russian serial killers
