= December 1978 =

Month of 1978

<<	December 1978					>>
Su	Mo	Tu	We	Th	Fr	Sa
					1	2
3	4	5	6	7	8	9
10	11	12	13	14	15	16
17	18	19	20	21	22	23
24	25	26	27	28	29	30
31

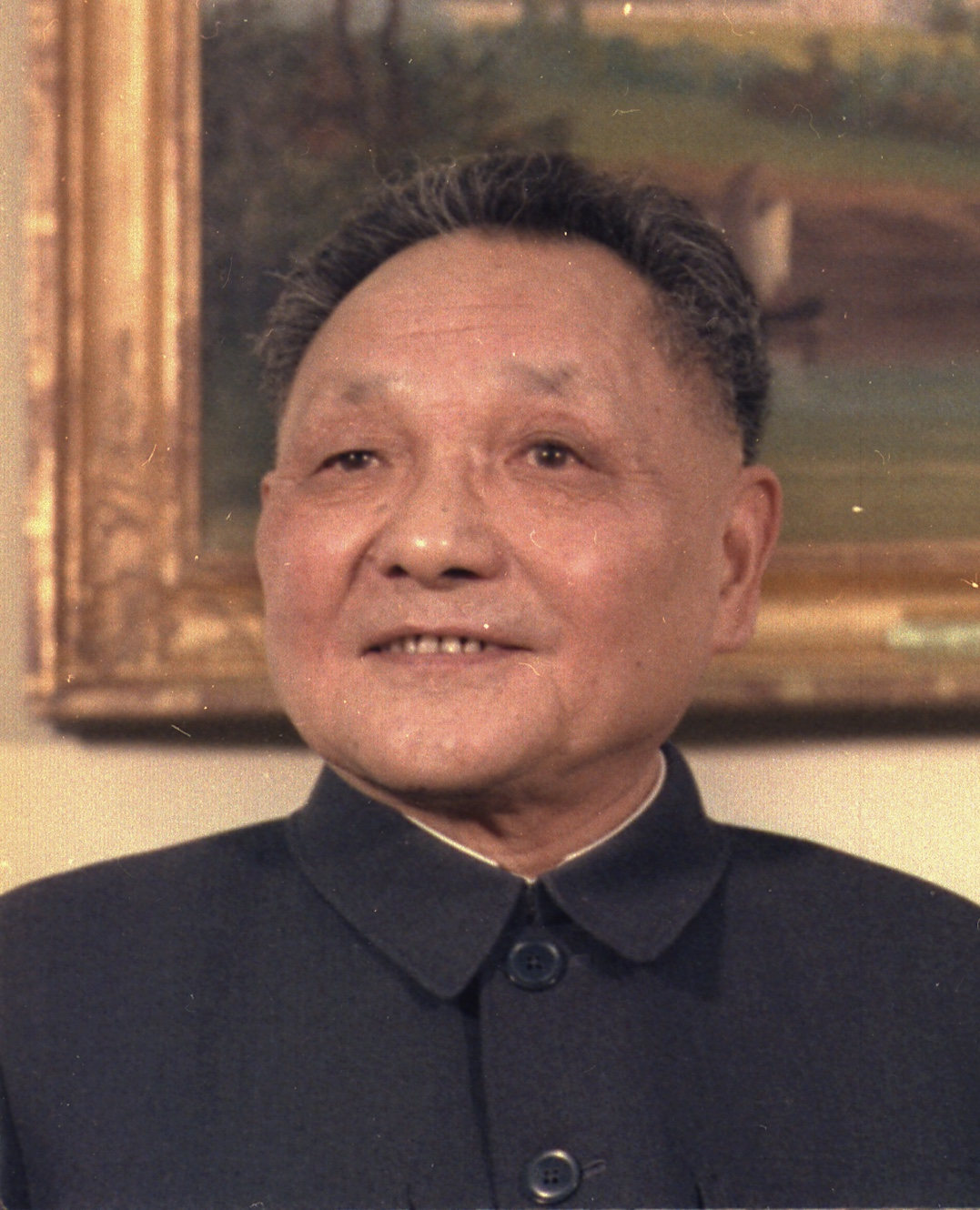
December 18, 1978: Chinese leader Deng Xiaoping begins an economic revolution in China

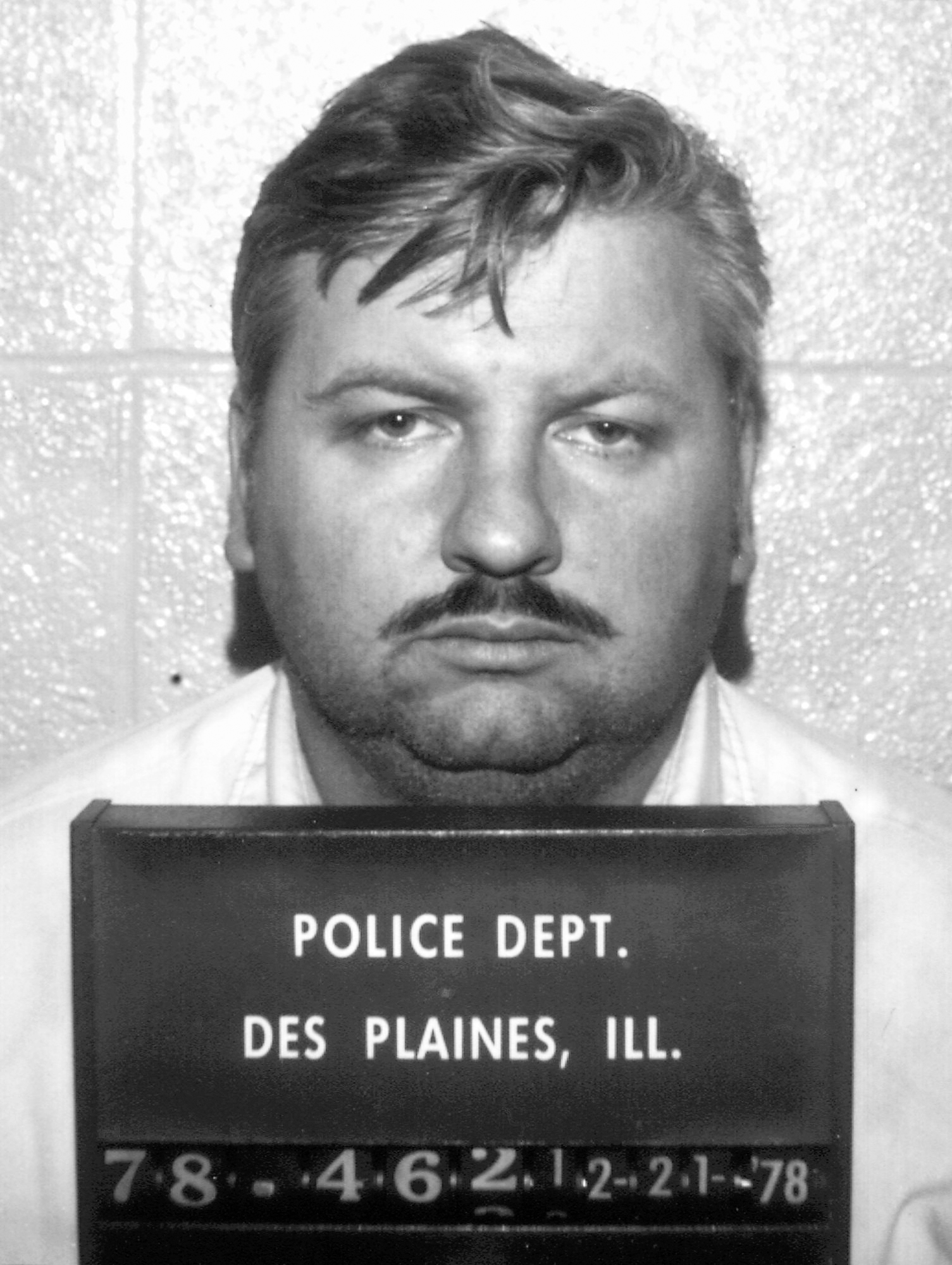
December 21, 1978: U.S. serial killer John Wayne Gacy arrested 10 days after murdering the last of at least 33 victims

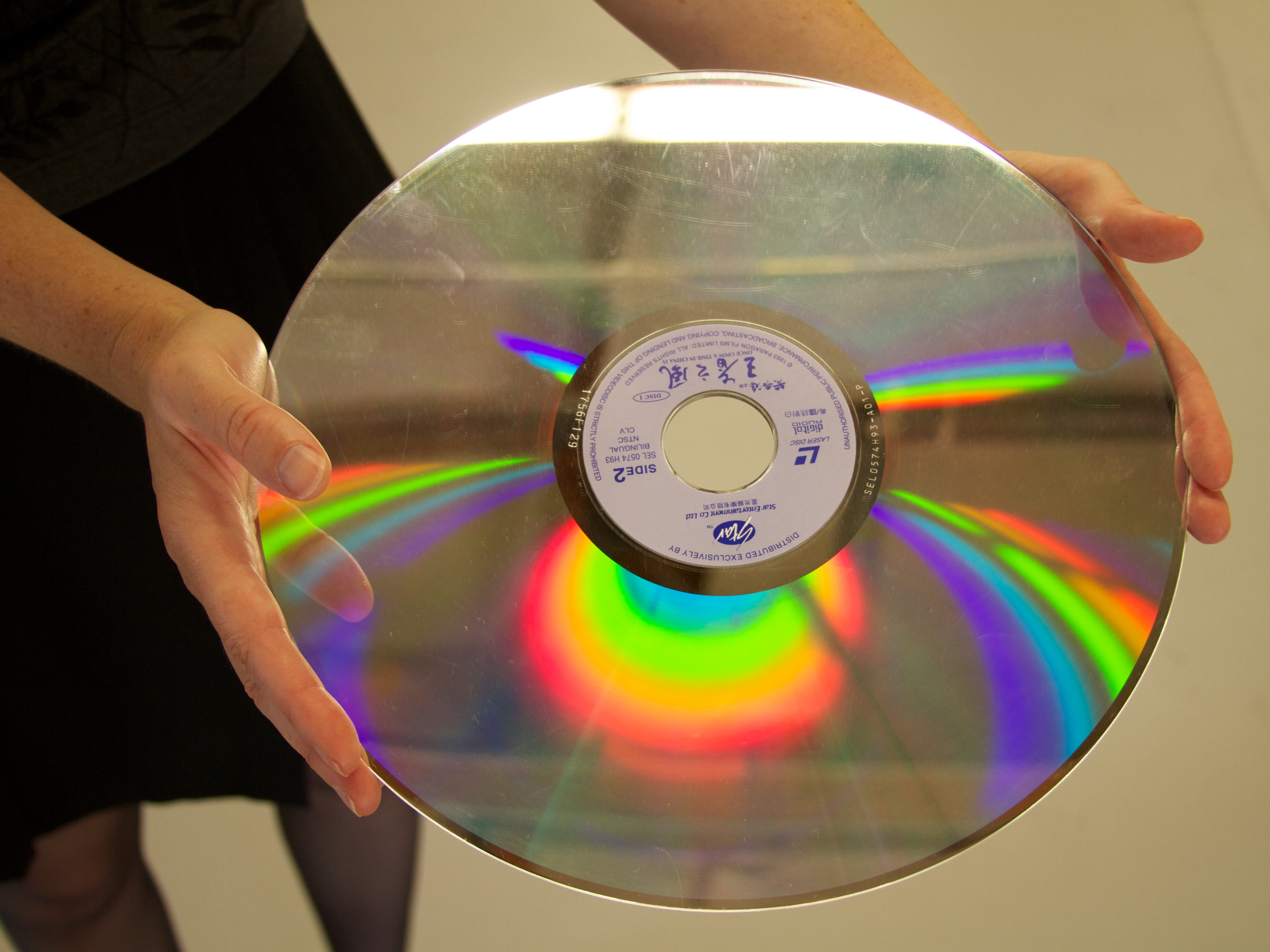
December 15, 1978: The LaserDisc goes on sale

The following events occurred in December 1978:

== December 1, 1978 (Friday) ==
- The longest road tunnel in the world up to that time, the 14-kilometre (8.7 mi) Arlberg Strassentunnel, opened to traffic in Austria between St Anton am Arlberg in Tyrol and Langen am Arlberg in Vorarlberg, almost four and a half years after construction started on July 5, 1974.
- U.S. President Jimmy Carter issued an executive order designating 56 million acres (87,500 square miles or larger than the U.S. state of Minnesota) of federally-owned land, the most ever set aside by an American president, as a set of 17 new U.S. national monuments. The move came 16 days before a federal prohibition against oil and gas exploration was set to expire. Carter said in a statement, "The actions I have taken today provide for urgently needed permanent protections. However, they are taken in the hope that the 96th Congress will act promptly to pass Alaska lands legislation."
- ATS-3, the third Applications Technology Satellite geostationary weather satellite, was deactivated more than 11 years after its launch on November 5, 1967. the ATS-3 had transmitted the first full color images of the Earth and had been expected to operate for only three years.
- The Information Security Oversight Office (ISOO) was formed in the United States by U.S. President Jimmy Carter with the issuance of Executive Order 12065. The ISOO became part of the National Archives with guidance from the U.S. National Security Council.
- Born:
  - Jen Psaki, U.S. government official, White House Press Secretary for U.S. President Joe Biden in 2021 and 2022; in New York City
  - Samvel Shahramanyan, Armenian politician who served for the last four months of 2023 as the fifth and last President of the short-lived Republic of Artsakh during its breakaway from the Republic of Azerbaijan; in Stepanakert, Nagorno-Karabakh Autonomous Oblast, Azerbaijan SSR, Soviet Union
- Died: Botha Sigcau, 65, African paramount chief of a sub-tribe of the Mpondo people in South Africa and the first President of the homeland of Transkei on October 29, 1976, died two years after taking office. He was succeeded briefly by Zwelibanzi Maneli Mabandla who served as acting president until Prime Minister Kaiser Matanzima became President on February 20, 1979.

== December 2, 1978 (Saturday) ==
- The Kampuchean United Front for National Salvation, which would overthrow the Khmer Rouge regime of Pol Pot with aid from Vietnam in 1979, was formed by Heng Samrin and 70 other dissidents in Kratié province in Democratic Kampuchea, near the border with Vietnam.
- An overloaded boat carrying refugees fleeing Vietnam sank off the coast of Malaysia in rough seas, drowning 130 people. Another 148 refugees were able to swim ashore or were rescued. A similar accident on November 22 had killed 254 people.
- Born:
  - Nelly Furtado, Canadian singer known for the song "Promiscuous" and the album Loose; in Victoria, British Columbia
  - Nine Nine (stage name for Tin Zaw Latt), Myanmar Burmese film actor; in Rangoon, Burma (now Yangon, Myanmar)

== December 3, 1978 (Sunday) ==
- Elections were held in Venezuela for a new president and for all 199 seats of the Cámara de Diputados and all 44 seats of the Senado. Luis Herrera Campins of the COPEI party defeated two other candidates, Luis Piñerúa Ordaz of Acción Democrática and José Vicente Rangel of Movimiento al Socialismo (MAS).
- Died: William Grant Still, 83, American composer

== December 4, 1978 (Monday) ==
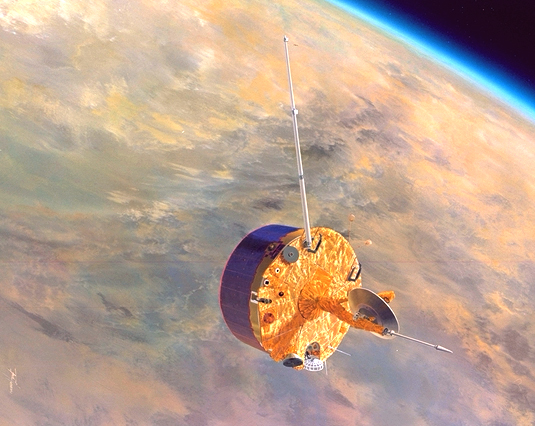
Pioneer 12

- Pioneer 12, the Pioneer Venus Orbiter, launched from the U.S. on May 20, 1978, entered an elliptical orbit around Venus. It would transmit data for almost 14 years until decaying from orbit and crashing on Venus on October 22, 1992.
- Serial killers Gary and Thaddeus Lewingdon claimed their eighth and final murder victim, as Gary Lewington shot a 56-year-old man, Joseph Ennick. The homicide took place slightly less than a year after their the two brothers had killed their first victim on December 10, 1977, in what the press called "The .22 caliber murders" because of the gun used. After being arrested, Gary would implicate his brother Thaddeus in the other murders.
- Vietnamese troops entered northeastern Cambodia in support of the new Kampuchean United Front headed by Heng Semrin, in what was described as an attempt to create a "liberated zone" and a rival Communist "state within a state."
- Born: Lars Bystøl, Norwegian ski jumper, 2006 Olympic gold medalist; in Voss
- Died: William A. Steiger, 40, U.S. Representative for Wisconsin since 1967. Steiger, a Republican, had gained national attention for helping secure a reduction in the capital gains tax and had "appeared headed for a top role in his party's congressional leadership" after being elected to an 11th term in November.

== December 5, 1978 (Tuesday) ==
- The Fifth Modernization, the most famous of the "big-character posters" to be put on the Democracy Wall in Beijing, was written by former Red Guard Wei Jingsheng. Addressing the "Four Modernizations doctrine approved by the Chinese Communist Party to improve industry, agriculture, science and defense, Wei advocated that "People should have democracy. When they ask for democracy, they are only demanding what is rightfully theirs. Anyone refusing to give it to them is a shameless bandit no better than a capitalist who robs workers of their money earned with their sweat and blood. Do the people have democracy now? No. Do they want to be masters of their own destiny? Definitely yes." Wei proposed that, with freedom of choice of their leaders, the Chinese people would achieve modernization. In response, however, Wei was arrested and imprisoned for 14 years for being a "counter-revolutionary" activities.
- The leaders of six nations in the Council of Europe— Belgium, Denmark, France, West Germany, Luxembourg and the Netherlands— agreed to implement the new European monetary system where the values of their respective currencies would fluctuate against each other "within tightly limited bounds", with the members contributing to a joint fund of $30 billion (in U.S. dollars) to protect the agreed-upon currency values. Italy, Ireland and the United Kingdom declined to join the new system.
- The Soviet Union and the new Communist government of Afghanistan signed a 20-year treaty of friendship.
- Born:
  - Olli Jokinen, Finnish professional ice hockey player for 10 different NHL teams and four European teams between 1995 and 2015; in Kuopio
  - Neil Druckmann, Israeli-born American video game designer; in Tel Aviv
- Died: U.S. Air Force General George S. Brown, 60, Chairman of the Joint Chiefs of Staff from 1974 until his retirement on June 20, died of prostate cancer.

== December 6, 1978 (Wednesday) ==
- A national referendum was held in Spain on whether to approve or reject the proposed The Spanish Constitution, which set the provisions for completing the restoration of the European kingdom's democratic government. Despite irregularities in voter registration in some provinces and a lowering of the voting age to 18 before the election, voters overwhelmingly approved the new constitution by a margin of almost 92%, with only 1.4 million out of 17 million voting to reject.
- Born:
  - Jack Thorne, British playwright and screenwriter; in Bristol
  - Mijailo Mijailović, Swedish assassin known for the 2003 stabbing death of Foreign Minister Anna Lindh; in Stockholm
- Died: Norman Lee (stage name for Norman Uehle), 57, American band leader formerly with the Lawrence Welk Orchestra, was shot to death along with his wife and his publicist at the Lees' home near Wichita, Kansas. A warrant for murder was filed against Charles G. Martin, a former employee of Lee, on December 18.

== December 7, 1978 (Thursday) ==
- Masayoshi Ōhira formally took office as the new Prime Minister of Japan after being elected as the new leader of the ruling Liberal Democratic Party.
- A fire destroyed almost all of the newsreel films stored by the U.S. National Archives in 21 vaults in Suitland, Maryland. In order to work on an upgrade of the facility's air conditioning system, contractors had disabled several sprinklers, and a spark from a power tool ignited flammable nitrate film stock. The local fire department then opened fireproof doors to search for employees who might be trapped inside other vaults, causing the fire to spread.
- Edward R. Schreyer was approved as the new Governor General of Canada by Queen Elizabeth II, to take office in January.
- Born:
  - Shiri Appleby, American TV actress and the star of Roswell; in Los Angeles
  - Donny Alamsyah, Indonesian film actor known for Sunday Morning in Victoria Park; in Jakarta
- Died: Alexander Wetmore, 92, American ornithologist and avian palaeontologist

== December 8, 1978 (Friday) ==
- South Korea enacted a change to its compulsory military service law, continuing to conscript medical students of draft age, but assigning them to the Public Health Doctor program, to serve as physicians and dentists in underserved rural areas. In 1979, its first full year in effect, 300 physicians and 34 dentists were assigned to villages in farming and fishing areas.
- Five days of voting concluding in Namibia (at the time, referred to as South-West Africa and a trusteeship of white-ruled South Africa, as black Namibians voted for candidates for a constituent assembly in advance of granting Namibia independence. South African troops guarded the 1,100 polling places, and voter turnout was described as high. The Democratic Turnhalle Alliance, a party led by white Namibian rancher Dirk Mudge and consisting of 11 tribal and racial groups, won 41 of the 50 seats in the Namibian Assembly, while another white-led party, the Action Committee for the Preservation of Turnhalle Principles, won six seats. The United Nations had denounced the election and set its own supervised elections for July 1979.
- Born: Ian Somerhalder, American TV actor, known for The Vampire Diaries and Lost; in Covington, Louisiana
- Died: Golda Meir, 80, the fourth Prime Minister of Israel (from 1969 to 1974) and the first woman to hold that post.

== December 9, 1978 (Saturday) ==
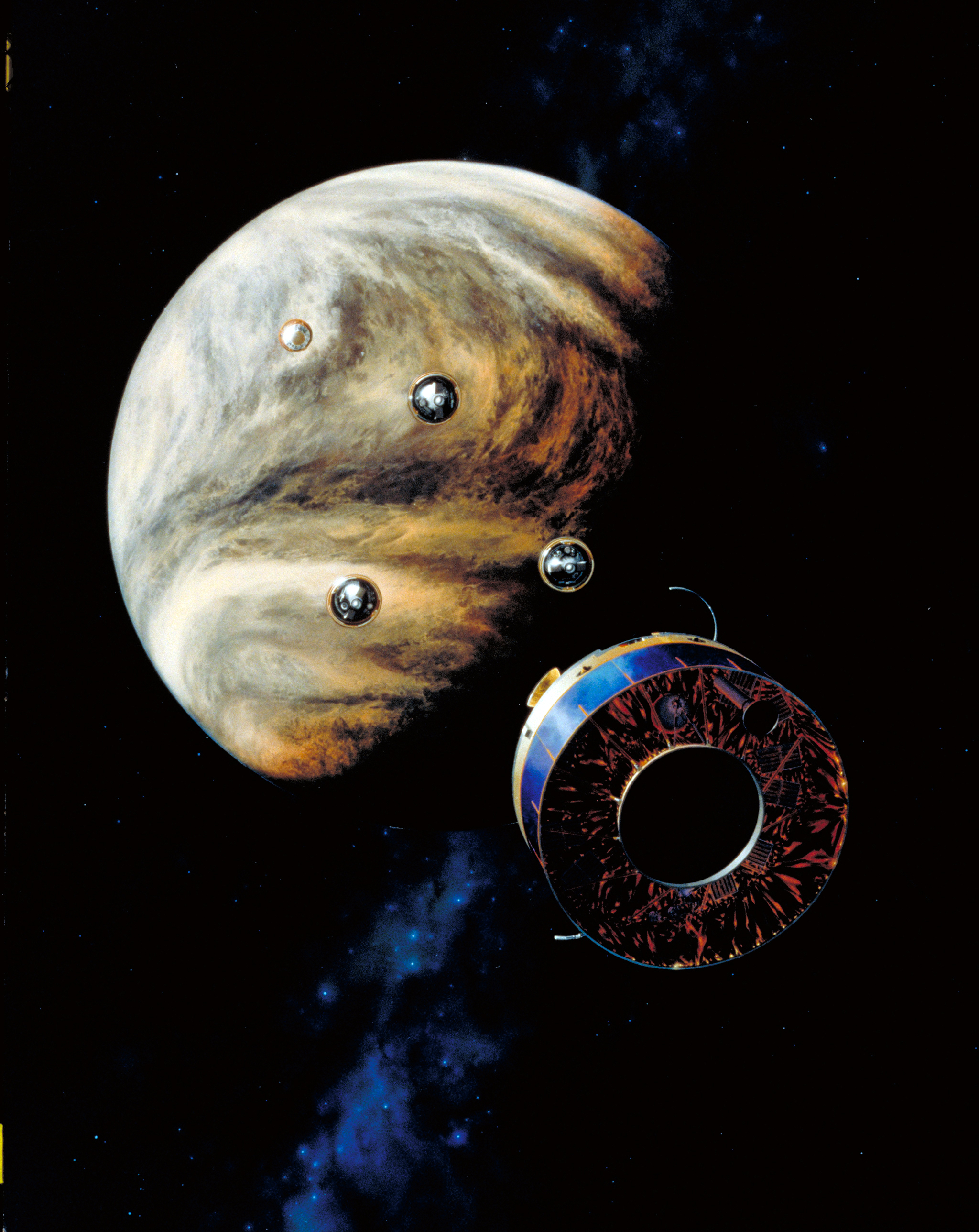
Artist's rendition of the arrival of the probes at Venus

- All five space components of the Pioneer Venus Multiprobe from Pioneer 13, launched by the U.S. on August 8, landed at different areas of the planet Venus, with four probes entering the Venusian atmosphere between 18:45 and 18:56 UTC and descending to their respective targets on the planet. The largest of the probes was the first to make impact, transmitting data until it crashed at 19:39:53 UTC. The North Probe crashed less than three minutes later, at 19:42:40. The Day Probe was the only one to survive impact, landing at 19:47:59 and then transmitting data for one hour and almost eight minutes. The "Bus" that had carried the probes entered the atmosphere at 20:21 and it signal was lost on its way down.
- The Women's Professional Basketball League (WBL), the first U.S. pro basketball league for women, played its first game. At Milwaukee Arena in Wisconsin, the Chicago Hustle defeated the Milwaukee Does, 92 to 87 before a crowd of 7,824 people. The other franchises in the 8-team league, playing a 34-game schedule, were the Dayton (O.) Rockettes, the Houston Angels, the Iowa Cornets, the Minnesota Fillies, the New Jersey Gems, and the New York Stars.
- Nottingham Forest's streak of 42 consecutive matches without a defeat ended as they lost to Liverpool, 1 to 0, then had 22 wins and 20 draws in regular play. Forest had lost to West Bromwich Albion in FA Cup play on March 11. Nottingham had not lost a game since November 19, 1977.
- A fire at a dormitory of the Ellisville State School, a residential facility, school and hospital for intellectually disabled people in Ellisville, Mississippi, killed 15 women and injured 16 others. All of the victims were more than 40 years old. The rest of the 129 men and women were able to escape by themselves or with the aid of hospital staff, firefighters and police. Investigation showed that the fire had been set by an arsonist who used lighter fluid in a storage room.
- In the U.S., Simon John Ritchie, better known as "Sid Vicious", of the Sex Pistols punk rock band, was arrested on assault charges, unrelated to the October 11 stabbing death of his girlfriend, Nancy Spungen (for which he had posted bail and been on release). He was transported to the Rikers Island jail in New York City and would be released on February 1, dying later that day from a heroin overdose.
- Evacuation of American residents of Iran began with aircraft from the U.S. Air Force 436th Military Airlift Wing on C-5 cargo planes.
- Angola's Prime Minister Lopo do Nascimento was dismissed by President Agostinho Neto after a three-day meeting of the ruling MPLA party. Neto announced on December 10 that he had abolished the office of the prime minister.
- Born:
  - Gastón Gaudio, Argentine professional tennis player, winner of the 2004 French Open; in Temperley
  - Ki Tae-young, South Korean singer, television and film actor, two-time KBS Entertainment Awards winner; in Seoul
- Died: Abdón Calderón Muñoz, 54, Ecuadorian presidential candidate, died 10 days after being shot multiple times at his home.

== December 10, 1978 (Sunday) ==
- The feature film Superman, directed by Richard Donner and featuring a relatively-unknown actor, Christopher Reeve, in the title role, had its world premiere at the John F. Kennedy Center for the Performing Arts in Washington D.C. as a fundraiser for the Special Olympics, before being released to general audiences in the UK on December 14 and in the U.S. on December 15. The first showing was attended by various celebrities, including U.S. President Jimmy Carter and the First Lady, Rosalynn Carter.
- Richard Pryor: Live in Concert, "the first full-length feature movie consisting of only stand-up comedy", was recorded during a single performance by comedian Richard Pryor at the Terrace Theater in Long Beach, California. In 2021, the film would be the selected for preservation in the United States National Film Registry by the Library of Congress as being "culturally, historically, or aesthetically significant".
- M/V Holoholo, a research vessel for the Research Corporation of the University of Hawaii, capsized and sank along with its crew of 10. The accident was blamed on the removal of a 2 foot by 4 foot hatch door that had been taken off to allow piping to lead into the engine room. At most, the opening was covered by plywood and not sealed.
- Died:
  - Ed Wood, 54, American filmmaker, actor and author profiled in the film of the same name, known for the films Plan 9 From Outer Space and Glen or Glenda?
  - Emilio Portes Gil, 88, President of Mexico from 1928 to 1930
  - Iolani Luahine, 63, American Hawaiian dancer

== December 11, 1978 (Monday) ==
- Six men robbed more than five million dollars from a Lufthansa airlines cargo facility at New York City's John F. Kennedy International Airport and got away with $5,000,000 in cash for the largest cash robbery up to that time in U.S. history and $875,000 in jewelry, equivalent to more than $28 million as of 2024. The money and jewelry had not been recovered 45 years after the crime.

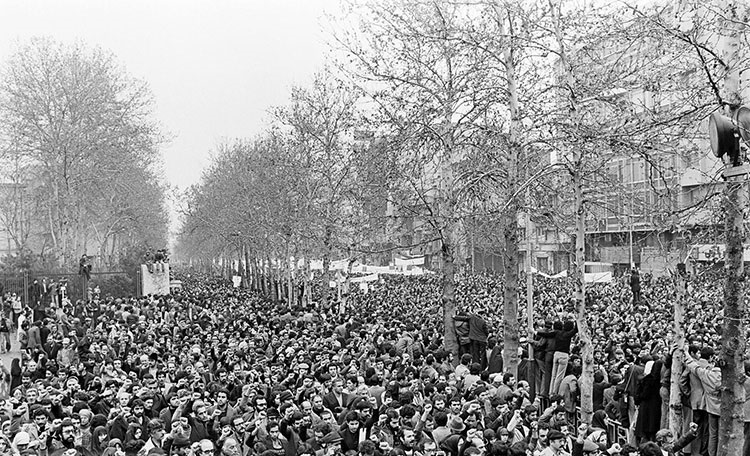
The Ashura demonstration

- In Tehran, capital of Iran, on the holy day of Ashura (Muharram 10, 1399 A.H.), a reported six million protesters, and perhaps as many as nine million, demonstrated against the Shah of Iran as part of the "Muharram protests" that had started on December 2. One historian would comment later that "even discounting for exaggeration, these figures may represent the largest protest event in history."
- One quarter of the fuel reserves of Rhodesia were destroyed in an attack by the Zimbabwe African National Liberation Army (ZANLA).
- Robert Piest, a 15-year-old employee at a pharmacy in Des Plaines, Illinois, became the last victim of serial murderer John Wayne Gacy. Piest was lured to Gacy's home on the promise of part-time employment, and then sodomized and murdered. Before disappearing, Piest had told his mother that "some contractor wants to talk to me about a job," and the pharmacy's owner identified Gacy as the contractor who had talked to Piest. The two statements led to Gacy's arrest a few days later.
- Died:
  - Vincent du Vigneaud, 77, American biochemist
  - Raúl Lastiri, 63, Argentine politician who served for three months as the interim president of Argentina during 1973 prior to the return of Juan Perón to power. Lasitri had been under house arrest since the 1976 overthrow of Isabel Peron.

== December 12, 1978 (Tuesday) ==
- All 28 crewmembers on the West German freighter MS München were killed when the ship was struck by a rogue wave in the North Atlantic Ocean north of the Azores Islands while sailing from Bremerhaven to the U.S. port at Savannah, Georgia. Although the ship's emergency buoy and five empty lifeboats were found, the ship and its crew remained undiscovered more than 45 years later.
- Voting was held in South Korea for 154 of the 231 members of the Daehanminguk Gukhoe, the nation's parliament. Although the opposition New Democratic Party (Sinmindang) of Yi Cheol-seung won more votes than President Park Chung-hee's ruling Democratic Republican Party (Minjugonghwadang), the NDP received 61 seats compared to the DRP's 68. President Park appointed the 77 non-elected members, subject to the December 21 approval of the National Conference for Unification. Of the 2,581 conference delegates, 2,539 approved the slateof appointees.
- In Zambia, where President Kenneth Kaunda's United National Independence Party (UNIP) was the only legal political party, voters chose from multiple UNIP candidates in 119 of the 125 districts of the National Assembly, with 732 candidates (or an average of more than three for each district) were approved. Kaunda, the sole candidate for President, was approved for another 5-year term by almost 81% of the voters in while almost 245,000 people voted "no" to his re-election.
- Born: Chen Dong, Chinese taikonaut who orbited the Earth in the Shenzhou 11 and Shenzhou 14 space missions; in Luoyang, Henan province
- Died: Fay Compton (stage name for Virginia Compton-Mackenzie), 84, English stage and film actress

== December 13, 1978 (Wednesday) ==
- At a closed-door session of the Central Working Conference of the Chinese Communist Party, Vice-Premier Deng Xiaoping, who had replaced Hua Guofeng as the paramount leader of China, signaled a major change in China's approach to domestic policy, with the speech Emancipate the Mind, Seek Truth from Facts, and Unite as One in Looking to the Future (解放思想，实事求是，团结一致向前看). In advance of the December 18 session of the Central Committee, Deng told the delegates that "In order to secure a people's democracy, the legal system must be strengthened. Democracy must be systematized to make it so that the laws do not change due to changes in leadership or due to changes in the opinions or focus of leaders... the laws are incomplete; many laws have not been made... we must focus our efforts on creating criminal law, civil law, procedural law and all necessary types of law.
- The first Susan B. Anthony dollar in the U.S. was produced, being struck by the Philadelphia Mint. The coins would not be released until July 2.

== December 14, 1978 (Thursday) ==
- The government of British Prime Minister James Callaghan narrowly avoided being forced out on a vote of confidence that had been proposed by Callaghan himself. Callaghan won the motion by only 10 votes, 300 in favor and 290 against, with 39 members of parliament refusing to vote. The 39 included 11 members of his own Labour Party. On March 28, 1979, a motion of no confidence would be offered by Opposition Leader Margaret Thatcher, with Callagahan's government losing by one vote, 311 to 310.
- Alex Haley, the author of the bestselling novel Roots: The Saga of an American Family, which had been adapted into a television miniseries watched by tens of millions of people in the U.S. in 1977, settled a copyright infringement suit brought by author Harold Courlander, who had presented evidence that Haley had "substantially copied" 81 passages from Courlander's 1967 novel, The African, in writing Roots. The amount of the settlement, later disclosed to be $650,000, was agreed to before the lawyers' closing arguments after a five-week trial.
- Died: Salvador de Madariaga, 92, Spanish diplomat, writer, historian, and pacifist

== December 15, 1978 (Friday) ==
- U.S. President Jimmy Carter announced in a speech on national television that the United States and the People's Republic of China had reached an agreement the day before to establish full diplomatic relations effective January 1. At the same time, the U.S. would sever its relationship with the Republic of China on the island of Taiwan. The "Joint Communique on the Establishment of Diplomatic Relations Between the United States of America and the People's Republic of China, January 1, 1979" was announced simultaneously by the government of the U.S. and China. Carter told the television audience, "As a nation of gifted people who comprise one-fourth of the population of the Earth, China plays an important role in world affairs— a role that can only grow more important in the years ahead."
- The first LaserDisc, the first commercial optical disc storage medium and a precursor to the DVD, went on sale. It was introduced at stores in Atlanta, Georgia and marketed in the U.S. under the name MCA DiscoVision, designed to play on the Magnavision videodisc player manufactured by the Magnavox company.. With a diameter of 12 inches (300 mm) it was similar in size to a long-playing LP record album disc and larger than the 4.7 inches (120 mm) DVD.
- Cleveland, Ohio became the first major U.S. city to go into default on its financial obligations, as the December 15 deadline to arrange for payment of $15.5 million in loans expired without the City Council agreeing upon a means of paying on its debts to six Cleveland banks. Mayor Dennis Kucinich had called the council meeting late in the day to get approval for a plan to increase the city's income tax from 1% to 1.5%, and a motion to suspend rules in order to take a vote at 11:59 failed, 16 to 17. As a result, "Cleveland became the first major U.S. city to default since the Depression." Kucinich announced two days later that one-fifth of the city's workers would be laid off., a decision reversed two weeks later when one bank delayed its plan to foreclose on the city's debts.
- Died: Theodore Childress "Chill" Wills, 76, American actor

== December 16, 1978 (Saturday) ==
- The collision of two trains in China killed 106 people and injured 218 others. Train 87 was traveling from Nanjing to Xining while Train 368 was on its way from Xi'an to Xuzhou. The two collided near the Yangzhuang railway station.
- Gamblers made illegal payments to members of the Boston College men's basketball team— Rick Kuhn, Ernie Cobb and Jim Sweeney— to engage in "point shaving", a practice of failing to score points in order to prevent their team from either winning or covering the point spread. Boston College had been favored to beat Harvard University by 13 points, but won by only three, 86 to 83, enough for the gamblers to make money betting for Harvard to win or to lose by 12 points or less. In all, the gamblers were able to win bets on four of nine games during the regular season.
- The first championship game of the NCAA's new Division I-AA college football conferences, took place in Wichita Falls, Texas in the "Pioneer Bowl", with the Florida A&M Rattlers defeating the University of Massachusetts (UMass) Minutemen, 35 to 28, at the completion of a four-team playoff.
- KTVU Channel 2 in Oakland, California, became the third "Superstation" in the U.S., after WTBS in Atlanta and WGN in Chicago. KTVU uplinked its broadcast, via Satellite Communications Systems, to a transponder on the communications satellite Satcom-1, making it available to viewers on cable television systems across North America.

== December 17, 1978 (Sunday) ==
- Parliamentary elections took place in Belgium for all 212 seats of Belgium's Chamber of Representatives and the 106 seats Belgian Senate took place after the resignation of Prime Minister Leo Tindemans and his coalition government. Paul Vanden Boeynants, who had succeeded Tindemans as leader of the Christelijke Volkspartij (the Christian People's Party), formed a new coalition of the same parties that Tindemans had of Flemish and French parties.
- Voters approved a new constitution African nation of Rwanda by a margin of 89% to 11%, granting President Juvénal Habyarimana and his National Revolutionary Movement for Development full power to govern.
- The Organization of Petroleum Exporting Countries (OPEC) announced after its meeting in Abu Dhabi that the 13 member nations would begin raising their minimum price for a crude oil, starting with a 5 percent increase from US$12.70 per barrel to $13.34 on January 1, 1979, with three more raises to increase the overall price by 14.5% ($14.54/bbl) by the end of that year.
- Born:
  - Manny Pacquiao, Philippine professional boxer and politician; WBC flyweight champion, 1998-1999, WBC super bantamweight (1999-2001), IBF super bantamweight (2001-2003), WBA, The Ring featherweight (2003-2005), WBC super featherweight (2005-2008), WBC lightweight (2008-2009); WBO and WBA welterweight (2009-2019), WBC super welterweight (2019-2021) champion; in Kibawe, Bukidnon
  - Chase Utley, American baseball player; 2008 World Series champion with Philadelphia Phillies; in Pasadena, California
- Died:
  - Don Ellis, 42, American jazz trumpeter, drummer, composer, and bandleader
  - Josef Frings, 91, German Roman Catholic Archbishop of Cologne

== December 18, 1978 (Monday) ==
- The historic gathering of the Chinese Communist Party's Central Committee was opened in Beijing by Deng Xiaoping, who expanded on his speech "Emancipate the Mind, Seek Truth from Facts, and Unite as One in Looking to the Future" that he had discussed five days earlier with the Party's major leaders. The speech would become "recognized as the singular milestone that marked the beginning of reform and opening-up in China" Another author would note in 2021 "The CCP's decision under Deng's leadership to open the Chinese economy to the Western global markets and to introduce large-scale market practices into China had profound impacts on the Chinese and the world economy," adding that offering incentives to increase production and welcoming Western investment and technology "spurred unprecedented economic growth, setting China on an upward curve of sustained economic growth and technological development to rival today its Western benefactors."
- The governments of Australia and Papua New Guinea signed the Torres Strait Treaty, establishing the maritime boundary between the two nations, to take effect on February 15, 1985.
- In a closed door session of the United States House Select Committee on Assassinations (HSCA), tangible evidence was first presented of a conspiracy in the 1963 assassination of U.S. President John F. Kennedy. U.S. Representative Harold S. Sawyer of Michigan disclosed two days later in a radio interview that the HSCA had been told by two acoustical experts "that there were four shots, the third of which was fired from the grassy knoll," a statement corroborated by Sawyer's fellow committee member, Christopher Dodd of Connecticut.
- Born:
  - Katie Holmes, American TV, film and stage actress; in Toledo, Ohio
  - Josh Dallas, American TV actor; in Louisville, Kentucky

== December 19, 1978 (Tuesday) ==
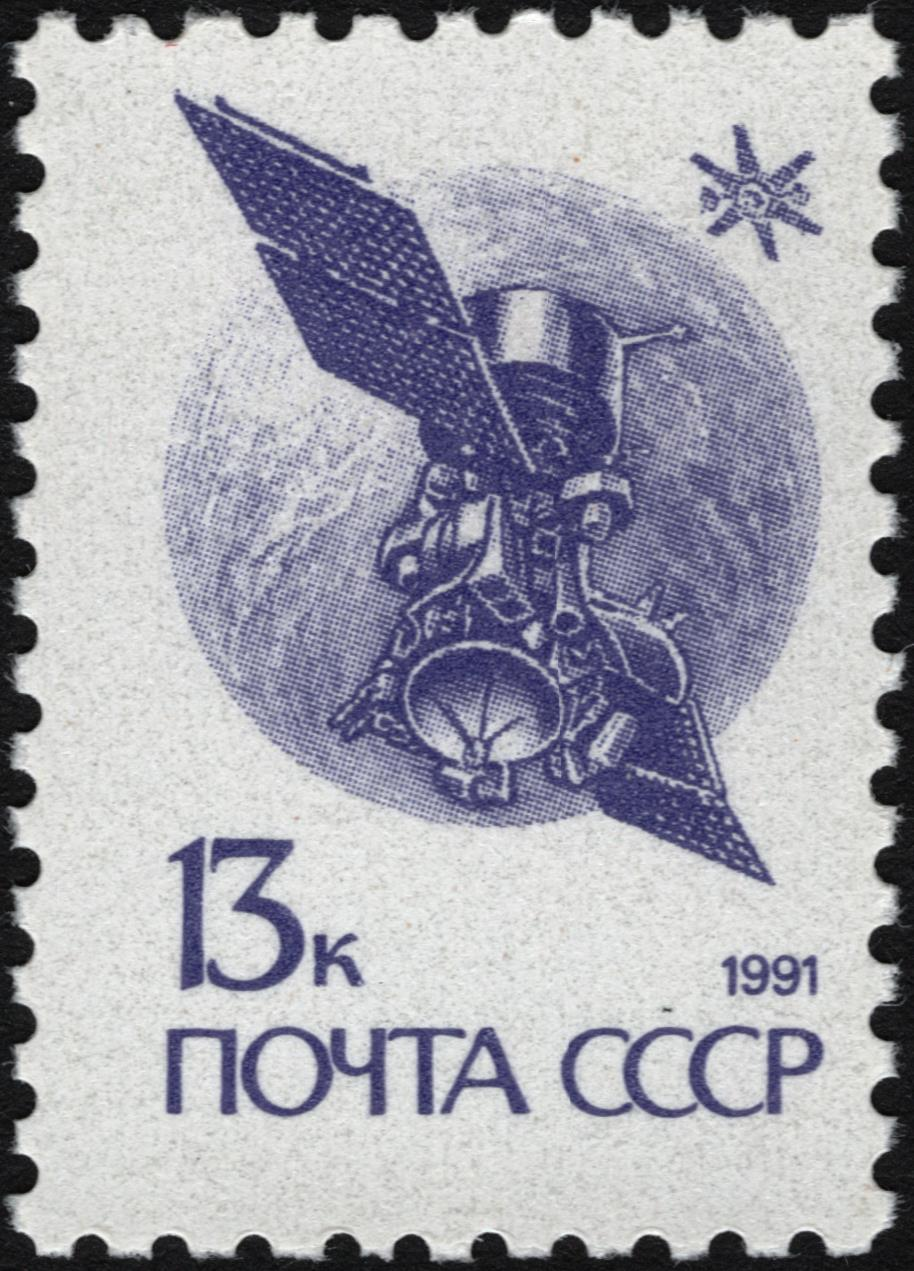
Stamp commemorating the Gorizont program

- The Soviet Union launched the first of its series of 35 Gorizont geosynchronous communications satellites, designated Gorizont-11L, initially to relay coverage of the 1980 Summer Olympics, scheduled to begin 19 months later. After the close of the Olympic games, the satellites would be used to distribute Soviet, and then Russian television programs.
- Former Prime Minister of India Indira Gandhi, who had recently won a by-election to be restored to the Lok Sabha parliament, was arrested on charges of breach of privilege and contempt of parliament, and jailed for a week. The Lok Sabha voted, 279 to 138, in favor of expulsion and a finding of contempt and breach of privilege.
- Former Prime Minister of Pakistan Zulfikar Ali Bhutto, in a final effort to avoid execution, appeared in person before the Pakistan Supreme Court to argue that the High Court in Lahore had been biased against him in trying him on charges of the murder of Ahmad Raza Kasuri. The Supreme Court would reject the appeal and Bhutto would be hanged on April 4, 1979.
- J. Paul Austin, chairman of the board of the Coca-Cola Company, announced that an agreement had been reached with the People's Republic of China for Coca-Cola to be the exclusive cola soft drink for China and its 800 million people. The deal barred PepsiCo, manufacturers of Pepsi-Cola, from entering the mainland Chinese market (though Coke and Pepsi were available in Taiwan). Pepsi had entered into an exclusive agreement with the Soviet Union and most of Eastern Europe to sell its soft drinks there in 1972. Neither company had been able to legally sell its products in mainland China since 1949.

== December 20, 1978 (Wednesday) ==
- More than 20 years after Guinea's President Ahmed Sekou Toure had bitterly parted ways with France after the French West African colony opted for independence, Toure welcomed France's President Valery Giscard d'Estaing to the Guinean capital, Conakry. France and Guinea had resumed diplomatic relations in 1975.
- Elena Holmberg, a diplomatic official of Argentina's Embassy to France, reported as ordered to appear before her superiors at the Ministry of Foreign Affairs in Buenos Aires, and was kidnapped by the Argentine Navy's Task Group 3.3 as she left. Her decomposed body would be found three weeks later in the Luján River.
- Born:
  - Geremi Sorele Nijtap Fotso, Cameroonian footballer with 118 caps for the Cameroon national team and 2000 Olympic gold medalist; in Bafoussam
  - Jacqueline Saburido, Venezuelan crusader against drunk driving who appeared worldwide after being severely burned in a 1999 crash; in Caracas (d. of cancer, 2019)
- Died: Stanisław Skrzeszewski, 77, former Foreign Minister of Poland from 1951 to 1956

== December 21, 1978 (Thursday) ==
- Chicago serial killer John Wayne Gacy was arrested after police discovered human remains in his home in the Chicago suburb of Des Plaines, Illinois. Gacy would be convicted of the murders of 33 young men and boys committed between 1972 and 1978. He would be executed by lethal injection on May 10, 1994.
- The Soviet space probe Venera 12 made a soft landing on the planet Venus at 03:30 UTC, slightly more than three months after its September 14 launch. It transmitted data to the orbiting flight platform for 110 minutes. Venera 12 would continue sending signals until April 18, 1980.
- The collision of a train locomotive and a school bus in Spain killed 28 children and one adult on a school bus that was transporting them to a Christmas party in San Muñoz, near Salamanca. The children ranged in age from 6 to 14 years old. The driver admitted that he had been told by several children that a train was coming and that he chose to attempt a crossing of the tracks anyway.
- The sinking of the ferryboat Poseidon in heavy seas, off of the coast of Fuerteventura, one of the Canary Islands, killed 12 of the 32 people aboard, most of them tourists from West Germany who were on a holiday vacation on the Spanish islands.

== December 22, 1978 (Friday) ==
- At the closing ceremony of the 3rd plenary session of the 11th Central Committee of the Chinese Communist Party, the Party endorsed the program proposed by Deng Xiaopeng to change policy in order to turn the People's Republic of China into one of the world's major economic powers. The communique published the next day summarized the five-day meeting, with the unanimous endorsement of the Central Committee for the proposition that "Now is an appropriate time to take the decision... shift emphasis of our Party's work, and the attention of the people of the whole country to socialist modernization. This is of major significance for fulfillment of the three-year and eight-year programs for the development of the national economy at the outline for 23 years, for the modernization of agriculture, industry, national defense, and science and technology and for the consolidation of the dictatorship of the proletariat in our country." The text added, "The plenary session calls on the whole Party, the whole army, and the people of all our nationalities to work with one heart and one mind... and carry out the new Long March to make China a modern, powerful socialist country before the end of this century. We are now adopting a number of major new economic measures, conscientiously transforming the system and methods of economic management, actively expanding economic cooperation on terms of equality and mutual benefit with other countries... striving to adopt the world's advanced technologies and equipment, and greatly strengthening scientific and educational work to meet the needs of modernization." Deng, who had persecuted during the Cultural Revolution, told the gathering that if the Party, the nation and the country, and the people Chinese people continued to follow the Quotations From Chairman Mao Zedong with stubborn mindset and blind superstition, then they would never move forward. The Party endorsed Deng's plans for a progressive change in economic policy, now referred to as Boluan Fanzheng or "Setting Things Right".
- Soviet Ukrainian serial killer Andrei Chikatilo, nicknamed "The Butcher of Rostov", committed the first of at least 52 murders, starting in the coal-mining town of Shakhty, where he was a schoolteacher. Chikatilo lured a 9-year-old girl, Yelena Zakotnova, to a small hut that he had purchased, then stabbed her to death while raping her.
- Argentina began Operation Soberanía ("Operation Sovereignty"), a war against Chile, to seize control of the islands of Picton, Lennox and Nueva was called off as ships of the Argentine Navy were transporting the 5th Battalion of the Argentina Marines to seize five uninhabited Chilean islands (Horn, Freycinet, Hershell, Deceit, and Wollaston) with plans to cross the border into the Chilean mainland. The invasion was called off on the same evening after calls by Pope John Paul II to the presidents of both nations. Cardinal Antonio Samore was then dispatched by the Vatican to meet separately with President Jorge Videla of Argentina and President Augusto Pinochet of Chile.
- The new Major Indoor Soccer League (MISL), a professional indoor soccer league with six teams, played its first game. The New York Arrows defeated the visiting Cincinnati Kids, 7 to 2, before 10,386 fans at the Nassau County Coliseum in Uniondale, New York.
- South Korea's President Park Chung-hee announced amnesty for 5,378 imprisoned people, 106 of whom were political prisoners, including Park's political rival, Kim Dae-jung. Kim, who had run against Park in the 1971 presidential election, had been sentenced to prison in 1976 for issuing the "Manifesto for Democracy", demanding that Park step down. Park also commuted the prison sentence of poet Kim Chi-ha, from life imprisonment to a 20-year sentence.
- The first Holiday Bowl, a postseason college football game in San Diego, was played as the U.S. Naval Academy defeated Brigham Young University, 23 to 16.
- Born:
  - Emmanuel Olisadebe, Nigerian-born footballer who had 25 caps as the first black player for the Poland national team; in Warri, Bendel State
  - Joanne Kelly, Canadian TV actress known for Warehouse 13; in Bay d'Espoir, Newfoundland
- Died: Malcolm Caldwell, 47, Scottish journalist and Marxist, was murdered in Cambodia, at a guest house in Phnom Penh shortly after having an exclusive interview with Cambodia's leader, Pol Pot. Caldwell had been one of three Western journalists, along with Elizabeth Becker and Richard Dudman, to be invited to the Communist nation noted for its brutal massacre of its people. The motive for the murder was never determined, but journalist Becker theorized that Caldwell had offended Pol Pot during their brief visit.

== December 23, 1978 (Saturday) ==
- The crash of Alitalia Flight 4128 killed 108 of the 129 passengers and crew as the Italian DC-9 airliner crashed into the Tyrrhenian Sea while attempting to land at Palermo after a flight from Rome. Most of the passengers were traveling to Sicily for Christmas.
- Ten of the 19 division of the Khmer Rouge army of Democratic Kampuchea, formerly Cambodia, began firing artillery across the nation's border with the Democratic Republic of Vietnam, particularly at the provinces of Dong Thap, An Giang and Kien Giang, all of which had formerly been part of South Vietnam before its 1975 conquest by North Vietnam. Vietnam launched its own invasion two days later, taking the Cambodian capital of Phnom Penh within two weeks.
- The existence of the United States Senate as an institution consisting of only men as U.S. Senators permanently ended as James B. Pearson resigned in order to allow Nancy Landon Kassebaum to be sworn in as Senator from Kansas 11 days ahead of schedule. While 13 other women had previously served in the U.S. Senate, there had been periods in between when there were no women senators. In the 45 years since Kassebaum took office, there has been at least one female U.S. Senator serving.
- Born: Víctor Martínez, Venezuelan player in the American League from 2002 to 2018, winner of the Silver Slugger Award 2004 and 2014; in Ciudad Bolívar

== December 24, 1978 (Sunday) ==
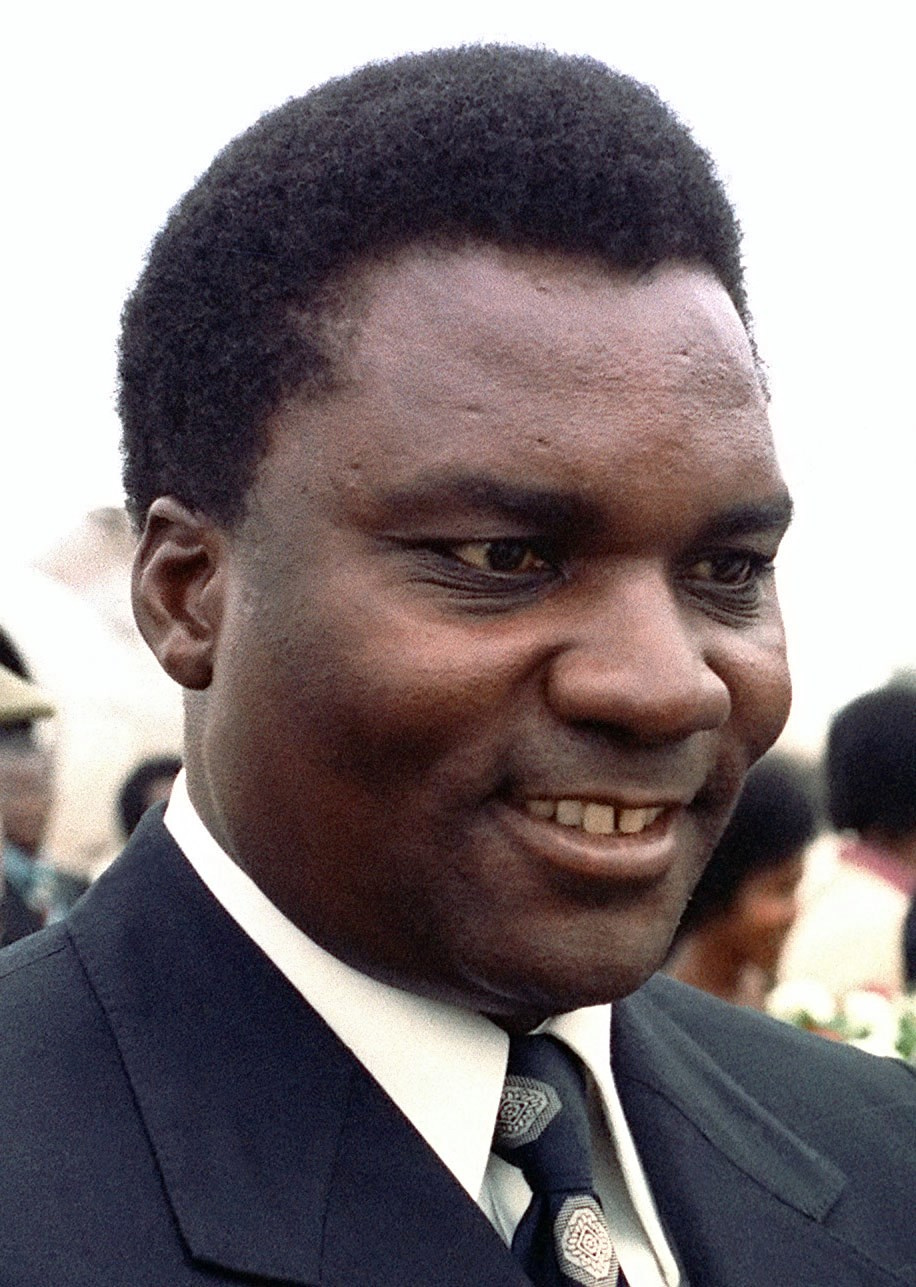
President Habyarimana

- Juvénal Habyarimana was elected to a five-year term as President of Rwanda one week after voters had endorsed a new constitution confirming the African nation's status as a one-party state and removing term limits on the presidential office. Habyarimana, who had overthrown President Grégoire Kayibanda in a coup d'état in 1973, ran as the candidate of the lone legal party, the Mouvement révolutionnaire national pour le développement (MRND). The government reported that Habyarimana had won 98.99% of the vote.
- Born: Yıldıray Baştürk, German-born Turkish footballer with 49 caps for the Turkey national team; in Herne, North Rhine-Westphalia, West Germany

== December 25, 1978 (Monday) ==
- Vietnam launched an invasion of Cambodia (at the time, "Democratic Kampuchea") in a major offensive against the Khmer Rouge Communists.

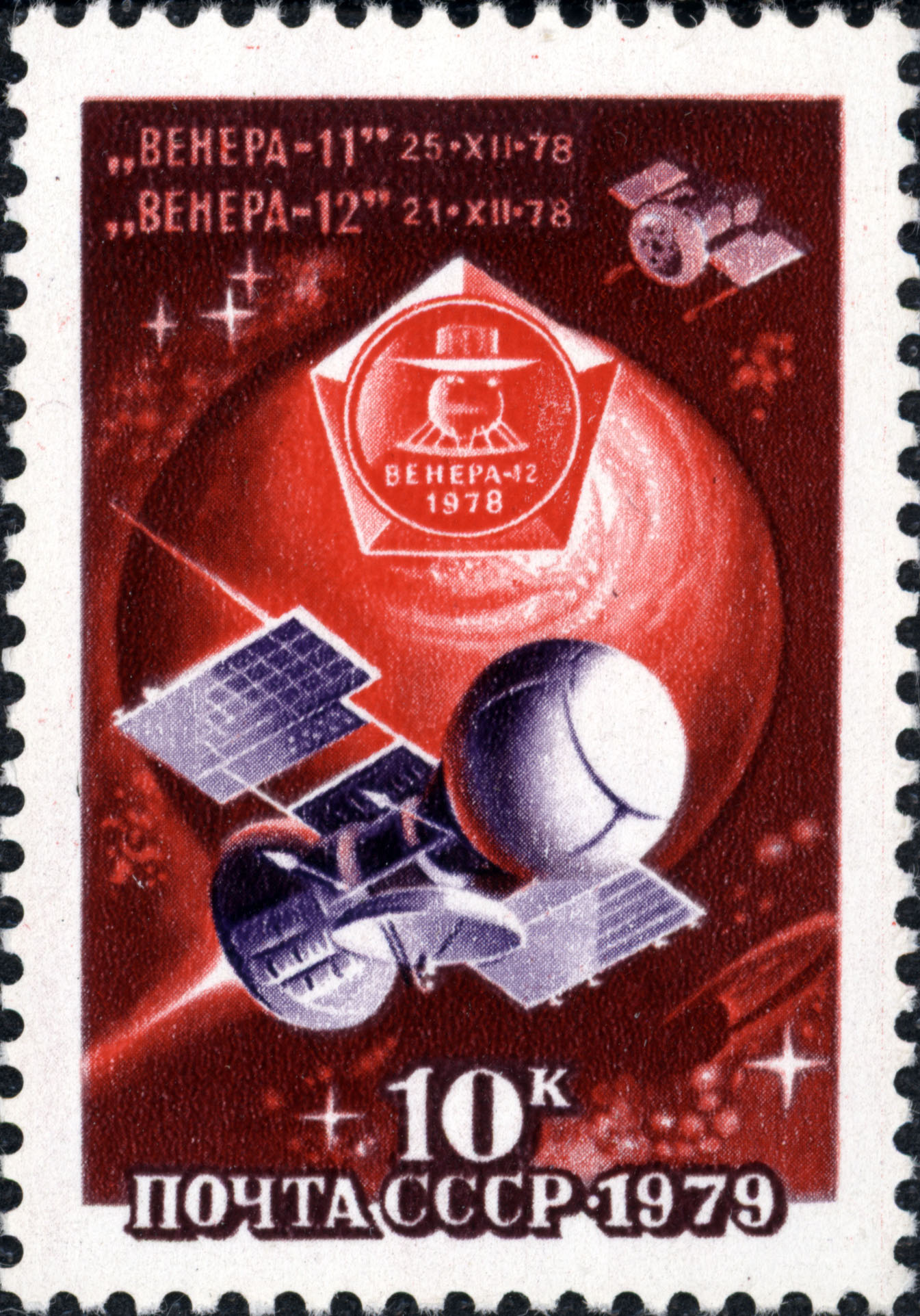
Soviet postage stamp honoring Venera 11 and Venera 12

- Venera 11, launched from the Soviet Union on September 9, made a soft landing on the planet Venus at 03:24 UTC, transmitting data until February 1, 1980.
- In his first Christmas as the leader of the Roman Catholic Church, Pope John Paul II read his greetings from the balcony of St. Peter's Basilica to an audience of 30,000 people and to millions watching on television worldwide. As part of his appearance, the Pope read greetings in 24 languages, including English, Italian, Spanish, Chinese, Arabic, Russian and Polish.
- Born:
  - Jeremy Strong, American TV actor known for Succession, 2020 Emmy Award and 2021 Golden Globe Award winner; in Boston
  - Paula Seling, Romanian singer; in Baia Mare
  - Miyuki Takahashi, Japanese volleyball player for the Japan women's volleyball team; in Yamagata

== December 26, 1978 (Tuesday) ==
- The first Dakar Rally, an annual off-road car and motorcycle race across France and through West Africa to the capital of Senegal, began as the "Paris–Dakar Rally" in Paris. The inaugural 10,000 kilometres (6,200 mi) race departed from the Place du Trocadéro with 80 cars, 12 trucks and 90 motorcycles. Over the next 19 days, the competitors traveled to the port of Marseille, from which they were transported across the Mediterranean Sea to Algiers, then began again on December 31 on a journey through Algeria, Niger, Mali and Upper Volta (now Burkina Faso) and Senegal. Of the starters, 37 cars, three trucks and 34 motorcycles finished while 108 other competitors dropped out along the way. On January 14, Cyril Neveu arrived in Dakar first on his Yamaha XT 500 motorcycle and a team of three drivers (Alain Génestier, Joseph Terbiaut and Jean Lemordant) were the first auto to arrive, traveling in a Range Rover V8.
- Former Indian Prime Minister Indira Gandhi was released from jail one week after she had been arrested. Her expulsion from the Lok Sabha parliament and her incarceration had been followed by nationwide protests, rioting and at least 20 deaths.
- Died: Dr. Alexander Haddow, 64, Scottish entomologist known for discovering the Zika virus in Africa

== December 27, 1978 (Wednesday) ==
- After the December 6 approval of the new constitution for Spain in a referendum, King Juan Carlos I gave his sanction of approval, officially ending 40 years of legalized military dictatorship.
- Following the December 22 amnesty announced in South Korea by President Park Chung-hee, opposition leader Kim Dae-jung was released shortly after midnight from the National University Hospital in Seoul, where he had been a patient for more than a year for acute arthritis. The release coincided with Park's inauguration to another six-year term, which he would serve for less than a year before being assassinated.
- Cambodia reopened the Angkor Wat temple and surrounding ruins to the public after more than eight years of closure.
- Died: Houari Boumédiènne, 46, President of Algeria since 1965, died of the blood disease Waldenström's macroglobulinemia, 39 days after he had lapsed into a coma.

== December 28, 1978 (Thursday) ==
- Canadian hitman Gérald Gallant committed the first of at least 28 murders, using iron bars to beat Gilles Legris to death in Gallant's hometown of Port-Cartier, Quebec, after Legris had allegedly assaulted a woman. Less than five weeks later, Gallant carried out his first contract killing, shooting drug dealer and suspected police informant Louis Desjardins at Gallant's tire garage in Port-Cartier. After 24 years, he would commit his last homicide, killing drug dealer Christian Duchaine on March 12, 2003. Gallant would finally be arrested on July 4, 2006.
- United Airlines Flight 173 crashed in Portland, Oregon at the end of a flight that originated in New York City, after running out of fuel. The DC-8 impacted in a wooded area near the intersection of NE 157th Avenue and East Burnside Street, killing 10 of the 189 people on board, and seriously injuring 23 others. One of the passengers, Kim Campbell, recently re-arrested after a conviction of armed robbery, assisted his corrections officer in evacuating people to escape from the plane and, after making sure that all surviving passengers were off the jet, "disappeared into the crowd" afterward.
- Panamanian-born jockey Niconar "Nick" Navarro was killed by a direct lightning strike. Navarro had just completed the second race at Calder Race Course, riding Noble Mischief, and was walking back to the jockey's quarters to rest in time for the fourth race when he was hit directly by the bolt.
- Born:
  - John Legend (stage name for John Roger Stephens), American musician, songwriter and film, TV and stage producer, winner of 12 Grammy Awards, one Tony Award, an Emmy Award and an Academy Award; in Springfield, Ohio
  - Feng Kun, Chinese volleyball player, captain of the China national women's volleyball team that won the 2004 Olympics and the 2003 World Cup, 2004 Most Valuable Player; in Beijing

== December 29, 1978 (Friday) ==
- The career of Ohio State University football coach Woody Hayes came to an end after 28 seasons and five NCAA national championships, when Hayes punched a player in the closing minutes of the 1978 Gator Bowl in Jacksonville, Florida. During the game between Ohio State and Clemson University, televised across the United States, Ohio State was losing, 15 to 17, when Art Schlichter threw a pass that was intercepted by Clemson's Charlie Bauman. Hayes lost his temper and, as Bauman was shoved out of bounds in front of the Ohio State bench, grabbed the player's jersey and punched him in the throat. Hayes was fired the next day.
- The Parliament of Singapore unanimously approved the re-election of Benjamin Sheares as President of Singapore, with 59 of the 68 members of parliament voting approval, and another nine members not appearing. Sheares was inaugurated the next day.
- Spain's Prime Minister Adolfo Suarez scheduled general elections for parliament for March 1, 1979, as the new Constitution of Spain went into effect upon publication in the Official Gazette of the Spanish government. On the day the new constitution became effective, the Catalan Assembly of Parliamentarians voted to submit the proposed Statute of Autonomy of Catalonia to voter approval, and the Basque parliamentary assembly voted for a similar referendum to be held on the Statute of Autonomy of the Basque Country. Both referendums took place on October 25, 1979.
- Born:
  - Angelo Taylor, American track and field athlete, 2000 and 2008 Olympic gold medalist for the 400m hurdles; in Albany, Georgia
  - Alexis Amore (stage name for Fabiola Melgar Garcia), Peruvian pornographic actress and inductee to the AVN Hall of Fame of Adult Video News; in Lima

== December 30, 1978 (Saturday) ==
- Scottish serial killer Dennis Nilsen, dubbed "The Muswell Hill Murderer" by the British press, committed the first of at least 12 murders, the day after luring a 14-year-old boy to his home in London. Nilsen strangled Stephen Holmes into unconsciousness, then drowned the teenager in a bucket of water and placed the body beneath the floorboards of his home. The body would remain hidden for more than seven months before Nilsen burned the remains. Over slightly more than four years, Nilsen would continue his killings until being arrested on February 9, 1983.
- Born: Tyrese Gibson, American R&B singer; in Watts, Los Angeles

== December 31, 1978 (Sunday) ==
- General Gholam Reza Azhari stepped down as Prime Minister of Iran after less than two months in office, ten days after telling U.S. Ambassador to Iran William H. Sullivan, "You must know this and you must tell it to your government. This country is lost because the Shah cannot make up his mind."
- The People's Republic of China announced that it would no longer fire artillery shells on Taiwan's offshore islands, including Quemoy, which had been under attack for 39 years, by way of China's Defense Minister Hsu Hsiang-chien, "to facilitate shipping and production activities in the Taiwan Strait" and to make it easier for Taiwanese residents to visit relatives on the mainland without consequence. The Communist Chinese government made a broadcast a message by Radio Beijing's Fujian station declaring that "Our state leaders have firmly declared that they will take present realities into account in accomplishing the great cause of reunifying the motherland and respect the status quo on Taiwan."
- Born:
  - Yulia Barsukova, Russian rhythmic gymnast, 2000 Olympic gold medalist in the women's individual all-around competition; in Moscow, Russian SFSR, Soviet Union
  - Tomomi Miyamoto, Japanese soccer football midfielder with 77 caps for the Japan national women's team; in Sagamihara, Kanagawa Prefecture
- Died:
  - Nicolau dos Reis Lobato, 32, who served as the President of East Timor briefly in 1975 before its takeover by Indonesia, was shot and killed by Indonesian soldiers.
  - Basil Wolverton, 69, American cartoonist known for his detailed "grotesques" style of illustration
