= January 1979 =

Month of 1979

<<	January 1979					>>
Su	Mo	Tu	We	Th	Fr	Sa
	1	2	3	4	5	6
7	8	9	10	11	12	13
14	15	16	17	18	19	20
21	22	23	24	25	26	27
28	29	30	31

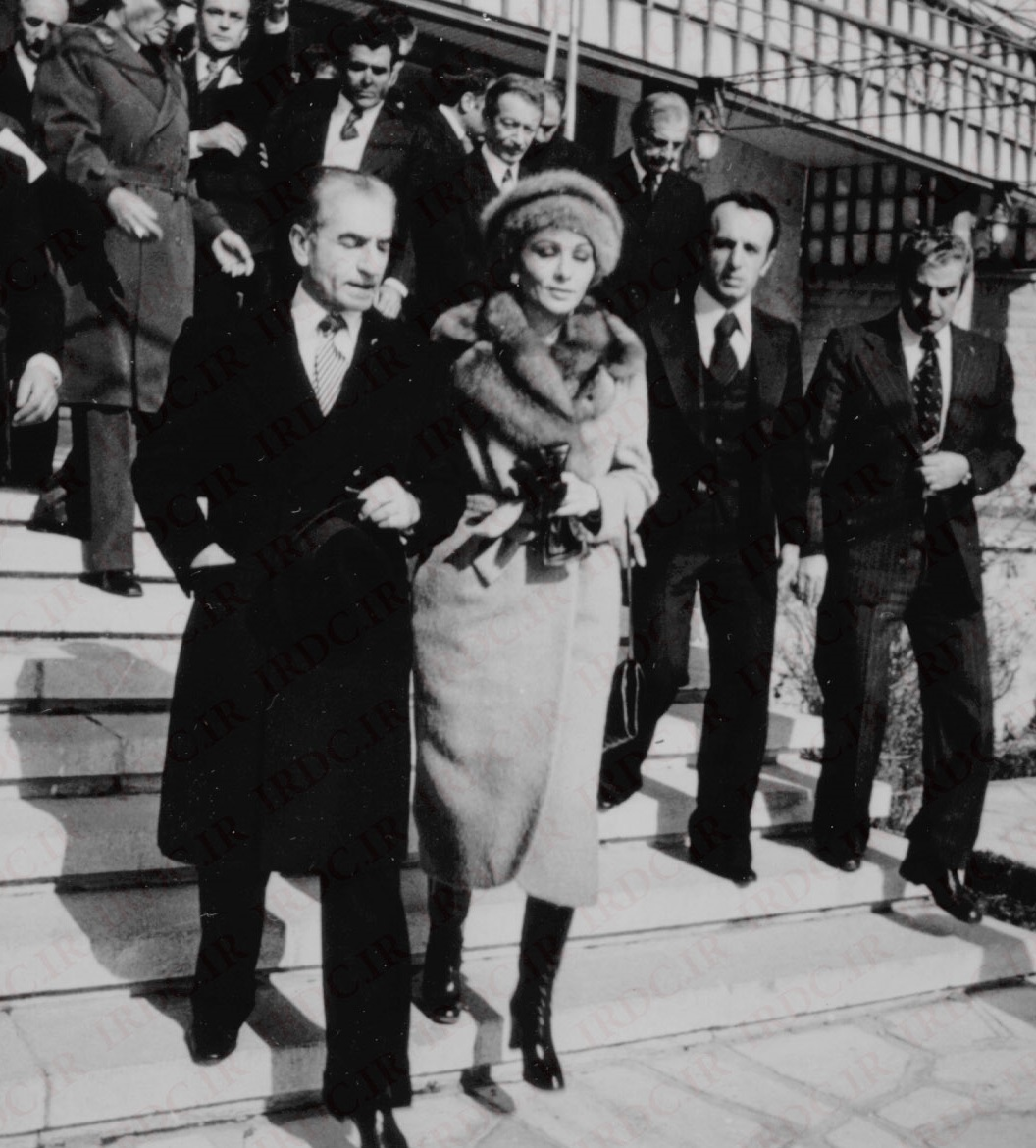
January 16, 1979: Mohammad Reza Pahlavi, the Shah of Iran, leaves Iran permanently.

The following events occurred in January 1979:

== January 1, 1979 (Monday) ==
- The United States and the People's Republic of China established full diplomatic relations in a ceremony held in Beijing with Vice Premier Deng Xiaoping leading the Chinese dignitaries, and the new liaison to China, Leonard Woodcock on behalf of the United States. At the same time, U.S. Vice President Walter Mondale and Secretary of State Cyrus Vance welcomed the new Chinese liaison to the U.S., Chai Tse-min, in Washington.
- Thirty-one of the 35 crew of the American-owned, Cyprus-registered tanker ship Master Michael died when the ship sank in the Caribbean Sea after catching fire during a storm. Four survivors were able to jump ship and swim to a nearby Italian vessel, the tanker Ilici, but a fifth crewmember drowned. Many of those killed had leapt into the ocean without life jackets and drowned. The Master Michael was not carrying an emergency life raft.
- The University of Alabama Crimson Tide, second-ranked team in American college football, defeated the #1-ranked Penn State Nittany Lions, 14 to 7, in the Sugar Bowl in New Orleans, in a rare #1 vs. #2 postseason matchup whose winner was likely to be recognized by the NCAA as the national champion of the 1978 season. At the time, the NCAA had no playoff to determine a champion and relied upon the "polls and bowls" system, recognizing the results of surveys of sportswriters (by the Associated Press) and of coaches of major college football programs (for United Press International). Unbeaten (11-0-0) and independent of a college athletic conference, Penn State had accepted the invitation to the Sugar Bowl to meet once-beaten Alabama, champions of the Southeastern Conference. A successful defense by Alabama on fourth down prevented Penn State from tying the game, and likely retaining its #1 ranking, when the Nittany Lions were stopped only 6 inches (150 mm) from the goal line.
- Switzerland's Canton of Jura, the 26th of the European nation's independent cantons, came into existence being carved from the northern section of the Canton of Bern. Bern had a majority population of German-speaking Protestants, and the French-speaking Roman Catholic residents of Bern voted on September 24 for separation.
- Following a deal agreed to during 1978, French carmaker Peugeot completed a takeover of Chrysler Europe, the overseas subsidiary of the U.S. manufacturer Chrysler.
- Mohammad Reza Pahlavi, Shah of Iran, made his first public appearance in more than two months and said in an interview that he had no intention of leaving the country, but that he would take a vacation after a new civilian government was formed.
- Marion Barry, Jr., the first national chairman of the Student Nonviolent Coordinating Committee (SNCC) was sworn in as the new Mayor of Washington D.C.
- Born: Vidya Balan, Indian film actress and six-time Filmfare Award winner; in Palghat (now Palakkad)

== January 2, 1979 (Tuesday) ==
- A draft constitution for the creation of a biracial government in Rhodesia to make the transition from white minority rule to a government of the African majority was published, declaring that name for the independent nation would be "Zimbabwe Rhodesia".
- Earl Campbell, Houston Oilers running back is chosen both Rookie of the Year and Most Valuable Player in the American Football Conference by the Sporting News, a weekly publication. He was the first player to win both awards since Jim Brown of Cleveland in 1957.
- Born: Jagmeet Singh, Canadian political leader and president of the New Democratic Party since 2017; in Scarborough, Toronto, Ontario

== January 3, 1979 (Wednesday) ==
- The Chinese Communist Party and the government of the People's Republic officially endorsed the right of disgruntled citizens to put up "big-character posters" (dàzìbào) that had been appearing in five Chinese cities since December, in the form of an editorial in the CCP newspaper Jenmin Jih Pao (People's Daily). "Let the people say what they wish," the newspaper declared. "The heavens will not fall. A range of opinions from people are good for a revolutionary party leading the Government. If people become unwilling to say anything, that would be bad. When people are free to speak, it means the Party and the Government have strength and confidence."
- Spanish Army General Constantino Ortin Gil, the military governor of the Madrid Province, was assassinated by two gunmen of the Basque separatist group E.T.A. General Ortin was preparing to enter the apartment building where he lived when he was shot by two men. The killing came a day after Basque terrorists had killed Major Jose Maria Herrera Hernandez, an assistant to the military governor of the Basque province of Guipúzcoa.
- Nancy Lopez who earned a record $189,813 as a rookie on the LPGA tour, is selected as the Associated Press female athlete of the year award.
- Died: Conrad N. Hilton, 91, American hotelier who built the Hilton Hotels chain worldwide

== January 4, 1979 (Thursday) ==
- The U.S. state of Ohio agreed to pay $675,000 to families of four people killed and nine wounded by the Ohio National Guard in the Kent State shootings of May 4, 1970. The estates of the four dead students were paid $15,000 apiece, while wounded students (including Dean Kahler, who was permanently paralyzed) received payments ranging from $22,500 to $350,000.
- The collision of two express trains in Turkey killed at least 56 people, and critically injured 32 after a blizzard caused automatic switches to freeze and malfunction, putting both trains on the same east-west railroad track between Ankara and Istanbul. The accident occurred at 11:00 at night "in an isolated Anatolian village 40 miles west of Ankara".
- Ron Guidry the slender New York Yankees left-hander authored one of the most remarkable pitching seasons in Major League Baseball history, was named Male Athlete of the Year for 1978 by the Associated Press.
- Born: Kevin Kuske, German bobsledder with four Olympic gold medals and five world championships; in Potsdam, East Germany

== January 5, 1979 (Friday) ==
- Future U.S. President George H. W. Bush, who had retired as the Director of Central Intelligence in 1977 and previously served as the U.S. Ambassador to the United Nations, filed papers with the Federal Election Commission to declare himself a candidate for the Republican Party presidential nomination in 1980.
- Died:
  - Pyotr Vtorov, 40, Soviet environmental scientist and pioneer in biogeography; from leukemia
  - Les Lear, 60, Canadian football player and head coach, as well as the first Canadian-trained player to play American football in the National Football League, later an inductee into the Canadian Football Hall of Fame
  - Billy Bletcher, 79, American voice actor, who voiced Pete in Walt Disney's cartoons.

== January 6, 1979 (Saturday) ==
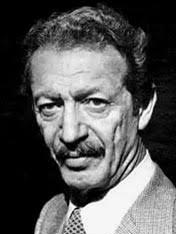
Bakhtiar

- Shapour Bakhtiar was sworn into office, along with a cabinet of ministers, as the new Prime Minister of Iran, providing the first civilian government for Iran in more than a year.
- An attack by the Zimbabwe African People's Union on a Rhodesian Security Forces ammunition stockpile set off explosions that killed 19 soldiers and wounded 13.
- 4 children were brutally murdered in their home in Geylang Bahru, Singapore. The children's ages ranged from 5 to 10 years old.

== January 7, 1979 (Sunday) ==
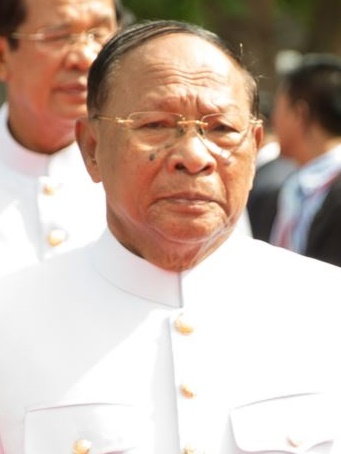
Heng Samrin

- Phnom Penh, the capital of Cambodia, fell to the Vietnamese Army and the Vietnamese-backed Kampuchean United Front for National Salvation, bringing an end to the Cambodian–Vietnamese War and the nationwide genocide of the rule of Pol Pot and the Khmer Rouge. A radio announcement broadcast from Hanoi declared "The regime of dictatorial, militarist domination of the Pol Pot—Ieng Sary clique has completely collapsed. Pol Pot and about 700 of members of his government retreated westward to an area along the Thai border, ending large-scale fighting and the Cambodian Genocide of almost four years. The next day, the new government announced that United Front had installed a 14-member People's Revolutionary Council of Cambodia, led by the Council's president, Heng Samrin.
- Born:
  - Bipasha Basu, Indian film actress; in New Delhi
  - Christian Lindner, German politician and leader of the Freie Demokratische Partei (FDP); in Wuppertal, West Germany

== January 8, 1979 (Monday) ==
- An explosion at Whiddy Island killed 50 people in Ireland's Bantry Bay when the French tanker Betelgeuse blew up at the Gulf Oil terminal at Bantry. The blast killed all 41 crewmen on the Betelgeuse and nine dockworkers. Emergency teams with hoses quickly acted to keep two storage tanks at the terminal, containing three and a half million barrels of crude oil, from being set afire by lumps of hot metal from the ship, preventing what would have been a much larger explosion. "Appalling though it was," the London Observer noted later, "last week's disaster at Bantry Bay, which cost 50 lives, could have been much, much worse."
- Born:
  - Sarah Polley, Canadian TV and film actress and director; in Toronto
  - Stipe Pletikosa, Croatian soccer football goalkeeper with 114 appearances for the national team; in Split, SR Croatia, Yugoslavia
  - Seol Ki-hyeon, South Korean soccer football winger and South Korean national team member; in Jeongseon-eup, Gangwon Province

== January 9, 1979 (Tuesday) ==
- The U.S. Food and Drug Administration (FDA) announced that it would start a promotional campaign for U.S. physicians and the American public to prescribe and use generic drugs as an alternative to brand-name pharmaceutical products. Joseph A. Califano Jr., the U.S. Secretary of Health, Education, and Welfare, which administered the Medicare and Medicaid programs, said in a statement that studies "have repeatedly demonstrated that consumers needlessly pay huge premiums to purchase brand-name drugs instead of their generic versions."
- Taiwan (officially the Republic of China and, colloquially, Nationalist China) would be allowed self-government and be allowed its own armed forces, if its leaders agreed to become a province in the People's Republic of China, according to Vice Premier Deng Xiaoping, who made the statement to a group of four visiting United States senators. In a televised address two days later, Taiwan's Prime Minister Sun Yun-suan (referred to in the Western press as "Y. S. Sun") told viewers, "Those who place their trust in Communist falsehood will face a tragic end. The peace talks proposed by the Chinese Communists are merely another form of class struggle. Plainly, they seek to induce us to surrender."

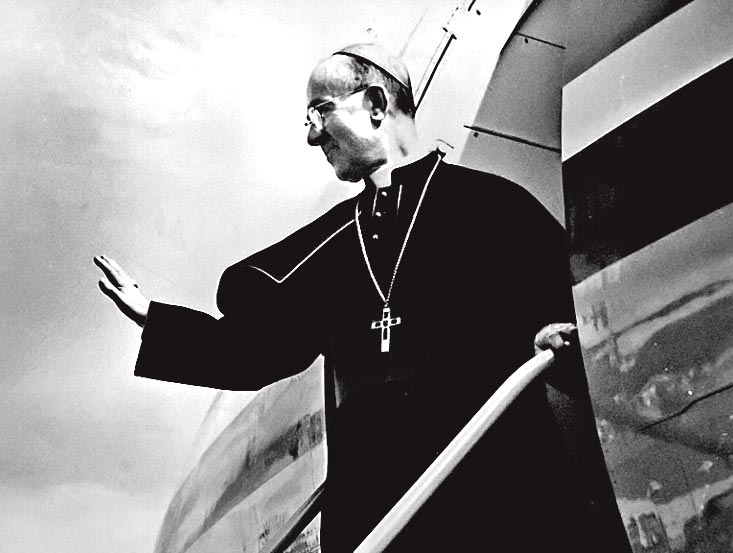
Cardinal Samoré

- An agreement was signed in Rome between the foreign ministers of Argentina and Chile to back off from the confrontation between their navies over three islands (Picton, Lennox and Nueva) in the Beagle Channel at the southern tip of South America, claimed by both nations. The negotiations had been moderated by Cardinal Antonio Samorè, a diplomat from the Vatican, and The Act of Montevideo was signed by Dante Caputo for Argentina and Jaime del Valle for Chile.
- The Music for UNICEF Concert was held at the United Nations General Assembly to raise money for UNICEF and to promote the Year of the Child. It was broadcast the following day in the United States and around the world. Hosted by the Bee Gees, other performers included Donna Summer, ABBA, Rod Stewart and Earth, Wind & Fire. A soundtrack album was later released.

== January 10, 1979 (Wednesday) ==
- Still in exile in France, the Ayatollah Khomeini announced the creation of a 16-member Council of the Islamic Revolution that would serve as the interim Government of Iran after the overthrow of the Shah and until a new parliament, the Majlis, could be established.
- Died: Walter A. Weber, 72, American artist who created most of the non-photographic illustrations of animals for the magazine National Geographic.

== January 11, 1979 (Thursday) ==
- Ieng Sary, Cambodia's Foreign Minister and the second in command of the Cambodian regime of Pol Pot, was allowed by the Thai government to cross into Thailand at the border, then flown by helicopter from Aranyaprathet with his family and allowed to board a Thai International Airlines at Bangkok on a flight to Hong Kong. Ieng, one of about 500 ranking members of the government who had fled to the town of Poipet on the Cambodian side of the border, was one of the few officials to be allowed in.
- Born:
  - Siti Nurhaliza, Malaysian pop singer and actress; in Kampung Awah, Pahang
  - Terence Morris, American professional basketball player with a career in the NBA and pro leagues in Russia, Spain, Israel and Greece; in Frederick, Maryland
- Died: Jack Soo (stage name for Goro Suzuki), 61, American comedian, singer and TV actor best known as police detective Nick Yemana on Barney Miller, died of esophageal cancer.

== January 12, 1979 (Friday) ==
- American serial killer Kenneth Bianchi, questioned as a suspect in the Hillside Strangler case, was arrested in Bellingham, Washington., the day after strangling two women college students. Bianchi was initially charged with second-degree possession of stolen property and held for questioning by police as a suspect. Prior to the murder of the final victims, Bianchi and his partner in crime, Angelo Buono Jr., collaborated in the murder of ten girls and women in Los Angeles over a period of four months in 1977 and 1978. Buono, linked to the crimes by the statements of Bianchi, would remain free until October.
- Born:
  - Marián Hossa, Slovak professional ice hockey player with 19 seasons in the National Hockey League, and 2020 inductee into the Hockey Hall of Fame; in Stara Lubovna, Czechoslovakia
  - Lee Bo-young, South Korean TV actress; in Seoul

== January 13, 1979 (Saturday) ==
- The Imperial Government of Iran announced the appointment the nine-member Regency Council that would exercise the ceremonial powers of the monarchy during the absence of the Shah, paving the way for the Shah to go into exile but reserving the possibility of his eventual return. "Though the council is expected to wield little power," a commentator observed, "it is a legal necessity to keep the monarchy intact while the shah is out of Iran."
- Born: María de Villota, Spanish race car driver and test car driver; in Madrid (d. 2013 from complications from an injury)
- Died:
  - Donny Hathaway, 33, American gospel music and soul music singer, a recent Grammy Award winner, jumped to his death from the 15th floor of the Essex House hotel in New York City.
  - Lionel Greenstreet, 89, the last surviving member of Ernest Shackleton's Imperial Trans-Antarctic Expedition of 1914 to 1917

== January 14, 1979 (Sunday) ==
- In the UK, police in Glasgow advised more than a million residents of central Scotland to stay indoors because of "a mysterious vapor cloud... causing sickness and smarting eyes". The warning came after phone calls to police from the industrial area stretching from Glasgow to Edinburgh, and tests of the air indicated the presence of hydrogen sulfide.
- Born: Alastair Montgomery, the first boy (and only the third "test tube baby") to be conceived through in vitro fertilization, in Glasgow. In some sources, he is identified as "Alastair MacDonald" but his mother, Grace Montgomery, was identified in the exclusive story of the Daily Mail of London.

== January 15, 1979 (Monday) ==
- Marvin Mandel resumed office as Governor of Maryland for the final two days of his four-year term, after his conviction for mail fraud and bribery had been overturned by the U.S. Court of Appeals for the Fourth Circuit. Mandel had conveyed gubernatorial authority to Lieutenant Governor Blair Lee III on June 4, 1977, during Mandel's trial, and Lee had been the acting governor for more than 18 months.
- Born:
  - Drew Brees, American NFL quarterback and Super Bowl MVP; in Austin, Texas
  - Martin Petrov, Bulgarian soccer football star and winger; in Vratsa
- Died: Yang Zhongjian, 81, Chinese paleontologist also identified as "C.C. Young", an adaptation of Yang Chung-chien

== January 16, 1979 (Tuesday) ==
- Mohammad Reza Pahlavi, the Shah of Iran, left the nation along with his family. After boarding his royal jet airplane, a Boeing 707 dubbed Shahin, the Shah took off from the Mehrabad International Airport at 1:24 in the afternoon in an unannounced departure for what he described as "an extended vacation". Within 15 minutes, as word spread that the Shah had gone into exile, thousands of people in Tehran celebrated with the slogan "Shah raft!" ("The Shah is gone!")
- As the Shah was preparing to depart, an earthquake of 6.7 magnitude struck northeastern Iran, killing at least 200 people and devastating the villages of Bazanabad, Khurramabad and Ibrahimabad. The quake struck at 1:20 p.m. local time (9:50 UTC), minutes before the Shah's plane took off on its flight to Egypt.
- Born: Aaliyah (stage name for Aaliyah Dana Haughton), American R&B and urban pop music singer; in Brooklyn, New York (killed in plane crash, 2001)
- Died: Ted Cassidy, 46, American TV actor known for his deep voice and his tall stature of 6 ft 9 in (206 cm); his most memorable role was as "Lurch" on The Addams Family; from complications following open-heart surgery

== January 17, 1979 (Wednesday) ==
- By a 70% majority, Voters in Greenland opted for home rule on their domestic affairs, while remaining part of the Kingdom of Denmark. At the time, Greenland had about 50,000 inhabitants.
- Ray Blanton, the 44th Governor of the U.S. state of Tennessee, was removed from office three days ahead of the expiration of his term by leaders of the state legislature, after he had used his gubernatorial powers to commute the sentences of 49 state prisoners to time served, and gave full pardons to three others. Those who were released from prison included 23 convicted murderers. When a federal prosecutor warned legislative leaders that Blanton was suspected of issuing pardons in return for payment from supporters, and was planning additional pardons, lawyers in Nashville concluded that the state constitution did not provide a specific date for an inauguration, and the winner of the 1978 state election, Lamar Alexander, was sworn into office. Alexander was sworn in at 5:55 p.m. local time, before Blanton was going to sign papers to commute the sentences of 30 additional prisoners. After more than more than four months of reviewing the list of persons pardoned by Blanton, Governor Alexander would conclude that all 52 of the prisoners should be freed, with the last six being released on May 29.
- Born: Sharon Chan (Chan Man-chi), Hong Kong TV actress and model; in Hong Kong

== January 18, 1979 (Thursday) ==
- The Four Seasons, a ballet choreographed by Jerome Robbins from three Giuseppe Verdi operas, was performed for the first time, staged at the Lincoln Center by the New York City Ballet company.
- Stasi agent Werner Stiller of East Germany defected to West Berlin with secret materials, including lists of Stasi agents in West Germany, after breaking open a safe, then using his credentials and a forged paper identifying him to the Stasi guards as an agent permitted to travel west for espionage purposes, boarded a train at the Friedrichstrasse subway station in East Berlin and riding to West Berlin before his plan could be discovered.
- Born:
  - Leo Varadkar, Prime Minister of Ireland (Taoiseach) from 2017 to 2020; in Dublin
  - Paulo Ferreira, Portuguese soccer football fullback; in Cascais
  - Jay Chou (Zhou Jielun), bestselling Taiwanese Mandopop singer and actor; in Linkou
- Died:
  - Maurice Challe, 73, former French Air Force General who participated in a revolt to keep French Algeria from becoming an independent Arab nation
  - I. W. Whimster, 55, British dermatologist and pathologist, was killed in a motor vehicle accident in London.

== January 19, 1979 (Friday) ==
- Former U.S. Attorney General John N. Mitchell was released on parole after 19 months at the federal prison at Maxwell Air Force Base near Montgomery, Alabama.
- A bus crash killed 17 bus passengers and injured 35, when the bus driver attempted to make it across tracks ahead of an oncoming freight train in the Mexico City alcaldida of Madero near the Ticomán archaeological site.
- Born: Svetlana Khorkina, Russian artistic gymnast, Olympic gold medalist and winner of nine World Championship medals; in Belgorod, Ukrainian SSR, Soviet Union
- Died: Wlodzimierz Puchalski, 70, Polish nature photographer specializing in the birds and mammals of Antarctica, died at the Henryk Arctowski Polish Antarctic Station on King George Island less than a year after joining an expedition there. At his request, he was buried near the Arctowski Station.

== January 20, 1979 (Saturday) ==
- The grave of 8th century historian Ōno Yasumaro was discovered by accident by a farmer in the village of Tawaracho in the Nara Prefecture. Yasumaro was the writer of Kojiki, the oldest known written text of Japanese history, which he completed in 712. Farmer Hideo Takenishi, who owned a tea plantation, was digging when he struck bone fragments and a copper plate that served as Ono's grave and reported that the historian had "died on the 6th day of the 7th month of the Kigai year" (July 6, 723).
- At least 19 residents of an apartment building were killed in Hoboken, New Jersey, after an arsonist set fire to the five story structure.
- The South American nation of Peru carried out its last execution, as former Peruvian Air Force Sergeant Julio Vargas Garayar was shot by a firing squad for selling classified information to the government of Chile.
- Born: Rob Bourdon, American rock musician, drummer and co-founder of Linkin Park; in Calabasas, California

== January 21, 1979 (Sunday) ==
- The Pittsburgh Steelers defeated the Dallas Cowboys 35–31 at Miami's Orange Bowl in Super Bowl XIII.
- Born:
  - Brian O'Driscoll, Irish professional rugby union player and captain of the Ireland National team; in Dublin
  - Inul Daratista (stage name for Ainur Rokhimah), Indonesian performance artist and singer known for her suggestive style of dancing; in Pasuruan, East Java

== January 22, 1979 (Monday) ==
- Israel's Mossad intelligence agency successfully carried out the assassination of Palestinian terrorist Abu Hassan (Ali Hassan Salameh), the chief of operations of Black September, in retaliation for his role in the murder of 11 members of the Israeli Olympic team during the 1972 Summer Olympics in Munich, albeit at the cost of eight other lives. The instrument of Abu Hassan's death was a Volkswagen Beetle, laden with explosives and parked on Rue Verdun in Beirut in Lebanon. At 3:35 in the afternoon, as Hassan and four bodyguards were being driven down the street, a Mossad agent detonated the car bomb by remote control, killing all of the car's occupants. The blast also killed four bystanders on Rue Verdun, and wounded 18 other people. Abu Hassan was the fifth terrorist to be killed by Mossad agents as part of Operation Wrath of God.
- An announcement, that bank deposits and assets confiscated from industrialists during the Cultural Revolution would be returned to their owners, was made by one of China's Vice Presidents, General Ulanhu, who had gathered 200 disgraced property owners at a meeting in Beijing. Ulanhu, an ethnic Mongolian and the only minority Politburo member of the Chinese Communist Party told the former businessmen that their money would be restored to them, with interest, and that their reputations would be rehabilitated, with a restoration of professional titles that had been taken from them when they were denounced as "capitalist roaders". Ulanhu, Director of the Chinese Communist Party's United Front Work Department, said that the rehabilitation of the capitalists would "arouse the enthusiasm of former capitalist businessmen and industrialists" in the modernization of China.
- The 1978 American-made TV miniseries Holocaust was televised for the first time in West Germany, in the first of four parts spread over six evenings, as a syndicated program shown on regional networks. Coordinated by the Westdeutscher Rundfunk public broadcasting system, Holocaust was redubbed in the German language and was shown without commercial interruptions, and opened a debate more than 30 years after the end of the mass extermination of European Jews by Nazi Germany during the Holocaust. Despite not being shown on a national network, the final installment was watched by one-third of West German TV viewers and by an unknown number of East Germans who were in range of television signals from the West.
- Jalaleddin Tehrani, the Chairman of Iran's nine-member Regency Council, met with the Ayatollah Khomeini in France at Khomeini's home in exile at Neauphle-le-Château, near Paris, and presented his resignation to the Islamic leader. Tehrani had traveled to France only two days after the Regency Council's powers had started on January 16, when the Shah had departed into exile.
- In one of the major battles of the Uganda–Tanzania War, troops of the 208th Brigade of the Tanzania People's Defence Force (TPDF) clashed with the Ugandan Army and captured the border town of Mutukula (across the boundary from a Tanzanian town of the same name). In retaliation for the destruction and death caused by the Ugandan attack on Tanzania in October, TPDF soldiers destroyed the buildings in Mutukula with bulldozers, and killed civilians who had refused to leave, an action that horrified Tanzania's President Julius Nyerere and led to a directive to avoid destruction of civilian targets.
- Edward Schreyer took office as the 22nd Governor General of Canada, the largely ceremonial position as Canada's official head of state as appointed by the British monarch. Schreyer, the 43 year old former Premier of Manitoba called for national unity in his installation speech, speaking at different times during the speech in English, French, Polish, German and Ukrainian and urged that the province of Quebec not separate from the rest of the nation, declaring "To succumb to pessimism, to allow fragmentation, to accept the shattering of the Canadian mosaic, is to break faith with all who endured so much to build so well what we have today."
- Died: Sir Milo Butler, 72, the first Governor-General of the Bahamas since 1973, when the Caribbean nation became independent

== January 23, 1979 (Tuesday) ==
- Receiving 409 of 432 ballots, Willie Mays was elected to the Baseball Hall of Fame in his first year of eligibility. Referring to the 23 voters who didn't approve of Mays's entry into the Hall. Sports columnist Dick Young of New York's Daily News wrote the next day, "There are people in this world who think the Hall of Fame is such a lofty honor, no one should waltz in on the first try. If Jesus Christ were to show up with his old baseball glove, some guys wouldn't vote for him. He dropped the cross three times, didn't he?"

== January 24, 1979 (Wednesday) ==
- The Singapore Symphony Orchestra made its public debut, performing at the Singapore Conference Hall. Under the guidance of conductor Choo Hoey. With 14 of the 41 musicians being natives of Singapore, the orchestra was the first in the Asian nation to include a substantial number of Singaporean members.
- The crash of an Air Algérie airliner killed 14 of the 20 passengers on board. The Nord 262 turboprop airplane was on a 291 mi (468 km) flight within Algeria and was approaching Béchar from Adrar when it crashed 9 miles (14 km) short of the runway. An investigation concluded that factors in the crash were a faulty altimeter and the fatigue of the crew of three, who all survived the accident.
- Born:
  - Tatyana Ali, American TV actress; in North Bellmore, New York
  - Nik Wallenda, American high wire artist and acrobat who was the first person to walk a tightrope stretched directly over Niagara Falls, accomplished in 2012; in Sarasota, Florida.

== January 25, 1979 (Thursday) ==
- Robert N. Williams, an American automobile factory worker at the Flat Rock Assembly Plant in Flat Rock, Michigan, became the first person to be killed by a robot. Williams was fatally injured by a "transfer vehicle", a one-ton wheeled machine programmed to read requests for retrieval or storage of automotive castings from storage racks in the factory. After Williams was asked to climb on to a rack to manually retrieve a casting, the transfer vehicle went to the same rack and, carrying out its inventory retrieval program, extended a mechanical arm that crushed him.
- The monopoly that Western Union had been allowed in the U.S., since 1943, for the transmission of telegrams was put to a stop by the Federal Communications Commission in order to allow any competitors to enter the business. By 1979, the use of telegrams to send messages had declined steadily for 50 years. The peak of telegraph transmissions had been in 1929, and the use of telegrams was gradually superseded by the increased use of reliable, long distance telephone service. In 1943, Western Union had become the exclusive provider after the failure of its lone competitor, the Postal Telegraph Service.
- Pope John Paul II began his first visit as Pope to the Western Hemisphere, arriving in Santo Domingo, the capital of the Dominican Republic, and kissed the ground on his arrival at the site "where the first Christian mass was said in the New World", then toured the city where he was cheered by 250,000 people. The Pope was on his way to the Latin American Episcopal Conference (CELAM) in Mexico at Puebla.
- Died: Alberto Fuentes Mohr, 56, Guatemalan Congress member and a former Foreign Minister, was assassinated moments after walking out of the National Palace in Guatemala City. Fuentes was shot to death with a machine gun by terrorists believed to be members of the Guerrilla Army of the Poor.

== January 26, 1979 (Friday) ==
- The derailment of a passenger train killed 70 people and injured more than 300 were injured in Bangladesh, near Chuadanga.
- For the first time since the Communist revolution in China in 1949, movie theaters were allowed to show American films. With the celebration of the Chinese New Year 4676, customers packed cinemas in order to see movies such as Charlie Chaplin's 1936 classic Modern Times and the 1976 film Futureworld.
- The popular rural U.S. TV comedy The Dukes of Hazzard made its debut on CBS. Critics were generally negative, with one calling it "the most socially irresponsible series to hit the air in recent memory" and another commenting "CBS stoops pretty low tonight with the premiere of a dog called 'Dukes of Hazzard'.... It's a casebook example of what's wrong with network programming.". Another gave it a mixed review, describing it a "well done— cleverly conceived and written, entertaining and extremely well photographed" but adding "Morally, there are a lot of things wrong with 'The Dukes of Hazzard', from its portrayal of law and law and order to its bad grammar."
- Born: Sara Rue (stage name for Sara Schlackman), American TV, film and stage actress; in New York City
- Died:
  - Nelson Rockefeller, 70, former U.S. Vice President (1974–1977) and Governor of the state of New York (1959–1973) and multimillionaire businessman, died of a heart attack while alone at a townhouse with his young aide, Megan Marshack. The death prompted speculation, never proven, that Rockefeller and Marshack had been engaged in an adulterous act when he was stricken.
  - Mario Francese, 53, Italian newspaper reporter for the Giornale di Sicilia, was shot and killed in front of his home in Palermo by a member of the Sicilian Mafia, in retaliation for an investigative report he had written.

== January 27, 1979 (Saturday) ==
- Pope John Paul II arrived in Mexico City as part of his first major tour abroad and was cheered by an estimated one million people who stood along the road that his motorcade was traveling to the Basilica of Our Lady of Guadalupe.
- Preparing to return to lead Iran after years of exile in France, the Ayatollah Khomeini secretly sent a cabled message to U.S. President Jimmy Carter, via the American Embassy in Paris, proposing that if Carter used American influence on the Iranian military to clear the way for Khomeini's assumption of control of the government, Khomeini would protect American interests and citizens. Carter hesitated on Khomeini's request to persuade the government appointed by the Shah to resign, and the Iranian military was in disarray after Khomeini's return, ending whatever chances that the U.S. had to have diplomatic relations with the Khomeini government. The cables would remain secret for 35 years, before being declassified in 2014.
- BBC Radio 2 became the first network in Great Britain to broadcast 24 hours a day.
- Born: Rosamund Pike, British TV and film actress; in London
- Died: Qalandar Baba Auliya, 80, Indian Sufi mystic and founder of the Azeemiyya order of Sufism

== January 28, 1979 (Sunday) ==
- In Osaka in Japan, the two-day siege of a branch of Mitsubishi Bank in Sumiyoshi ended and 25 hostages were rescued unharmed after Zero Company, the assault team of the Osaka Prefectural Police, was able to storm the bank and kill Akiyoshi Umekawa. On January 26, Umekawa killed two bank employees and two police, then held the surviving bank customers and employees hostage.
- Deng Xiaoping (referred to in the Western press at the time as Teng Hsiao-ping) arrived at Andrews Air Force Base near Washington DC for the first official visit to the United States by a major Chinese Communist leader. Deng, the senior Deputy Prime Minister of the People's Republic of China landed at the base at 3:30 in the afternoon local time and was greeted by U.S. Vice President Walter F. Mondale and U.S. Secretary of State Cyrus R. Vance. Deng met the next day with U.S. President Jimmy Carter at the White House.
- The long-running program CBS News Sunday Morning, a 90-minute show that emphasized gentle feature stories rather than breaking news, premiered with Charles Kuralt as the host. Kuralt would be succeeded in 1994 by Charles Osgood, who, in turn, would retire in favor of the current host, Jane Pauley
- Died: Edwin Mbaso, 24, popular Zambian soccer football star, from injuries in a motor vehicle accident.

== January 29, 1979 (Monday) ==
- Brenda Ann Spencer opened fire on an elementary school in the San Diego suburb of San Carlos, California, killing two faculty members and wounding eight students and a police officer. Spencer, a teenager who lived across the street from Cleveland Elementary School, used a .22 caliber rifle and began shooting in sniper fashion for 15 minutes, beginning at 8:50 in the morning as students were arriving for classes. Cleveland Elementary's principal, Burton Wragg and the school's chief custodian, Mike Suchar, were both killed after being shot in the chest. Six girls and two boys, ranging in age from 7 to 12, received minor wounds although two were hospitalized for internal hemorrhaging from stomach wounds. Spencer, who had been given the rifle as a Christmas present, talked by telephone to a reporter for the San Diego Tribune, and when asked why she fired at the school, said. "I don't like Mondays. This livens up the day. I just started shooting for the fun of it." Her statement inspired the Boomtown Rats to record the popular song "I Don't Like Mondays".
- U.S. President Carter issued a commutation of the federal prison sentence for kidnap victim and bank robber Patricia Hearst, limiting her seven-year prison sentence to time served and clearing the way for her release on February 1. Hearst had been kidnapped February 4, 1974, and apprehended on September 18, 1975, after assisting her kidnappers in the armed robbery of various California banks.
- Died: Stepan Zatikyan, 32, Soviet Armenian terrorist who masterminded the 1977 Moscow bombings that killed seven bystanders and injured 37 others. Zatikyan was executed by gunshot, along with two accomplices, Zaven Bagdasaryan and Hakop Stepanyan.
- The southern African nation of Angola introduced its new currency, the kwanza to replace, on a 1:1 basis, the Angolan escudo that had been used during its time as a colony of Portugal. The value of the kwanza was equivalent at the time to the Portuguese escudo.

== January 30, 1979 (Tuesday) ==
- White voters in Rhodesia approved a new constitution that had followed the settlement of March 3, 1978 made between white-minority Prime Minister Ian Smith and Methodist Bishop Abel Muzorewa of the United African National Council. The new constitution provided for the nation to be renamed Zimbabwe Rhodesia and a gradual transition to black majority rule, starting with a 100-member House of Assembly with 80 black members and 20 white members. Slightly more than 85% of the white voters approved the transition plan.
- A Brazilian Varig cargo plane, carrying a crew of six and paintings worth $1.25 million dollars, disappeared while flying over the Pacific Ocean after departing from Tokyo with a destination of Rio de Janeiro. The Boeing 707-323C took off at 9:23 in the evening and the pilot's last call came at 9:45. At 10:23, the Varig plane failed to contact the Tokyo air traffic control as scheduled, and was presumed to have been lost about 130 miles (210 km) east northeast of Tokyo. The pilot, Captain Gilberto Araújo da Silva, had been one of the few survivors of the July 11, 1973 crash of Varig Flight 820.
- Iran's Prime Minister Shapour Bakhtiar and his cabinet held a special meeting in Tehran and made the decision to authorize the Ayatollah Khomeini to return to Iran after years of exile in France. Khomeini then prepared to fly home on February 1.

== January 31, 1979 (Wednesday) ==
- Colonel Chadli Benjedid was named as the new President of Algeria by the governing National Liberation Front (FLN) to replace the late Houari Boumédiène, who had died on December 27. Rabah Bitat, the highest-ranking legislative leader as Speaker of the National Popular Assembly, had served as the interim president for five weeks. Benjedid, the nation's acting Defense Minister, was also designated as the Secretary-General of the FLN.
- The Communist government of the People's Republic of China made the decision to experiment with free market economic policies by authorizing the first special economic zone (SEZ), creating the Shenzhen Special Economic Zone in an area in Guangdong Province on the opposite side of Shenzhen Bay from Hong Kong. Vice Chairman Li Xiannian, who would become the President of the PRC in 1983, approved the plan as a means of attracting foreign capital for the development of Chinese industry.
- Born: Jenny Wolf, German speed skater; in East Berlin, East Germany
- Died:
  - Reginald Mount, 72, British graphic designer and advertising executive
  - Grant Green, 43, American jazz composer and musician
