= Rampart Berg =

Iceberg

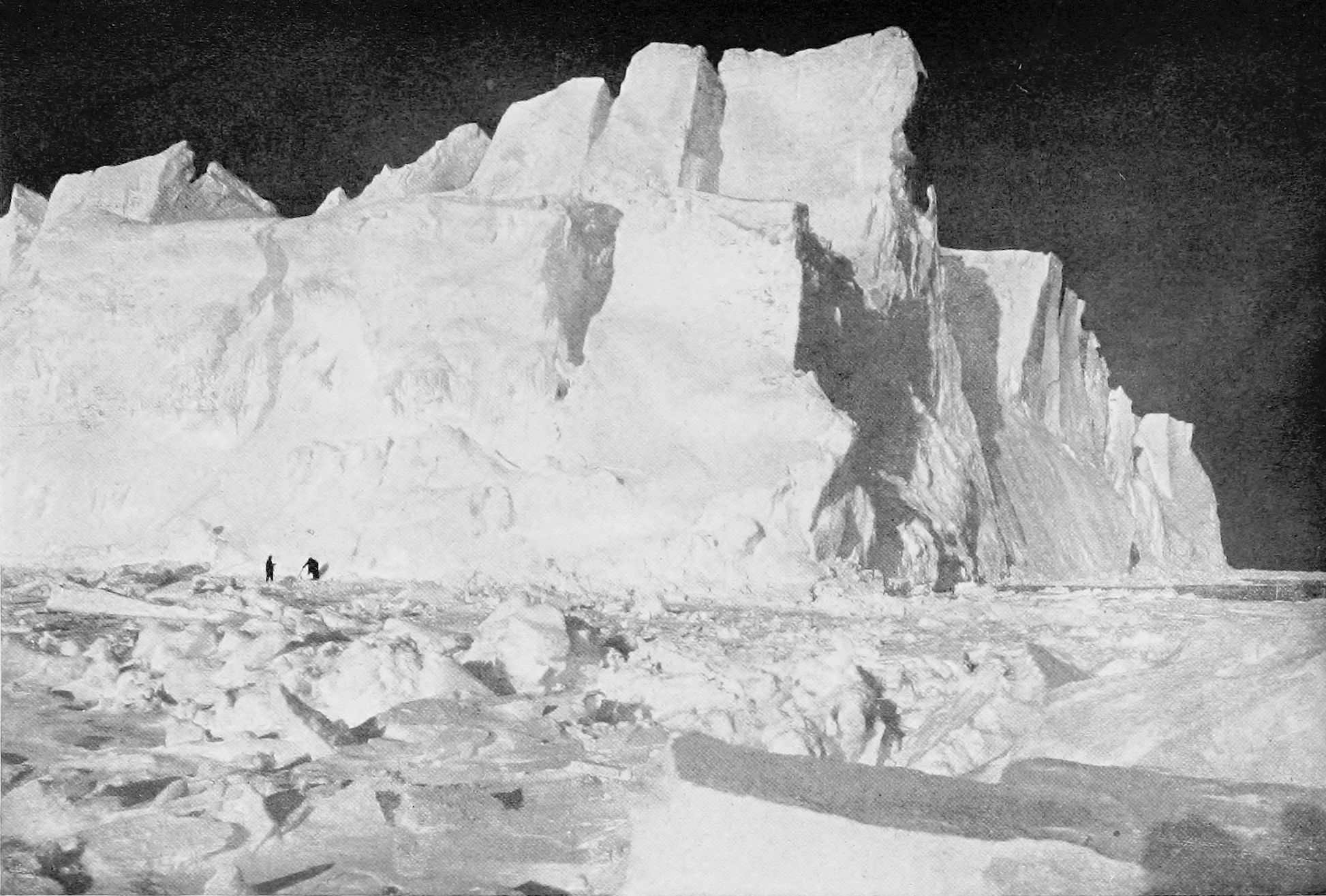
- Photograph of Rampart Berg, taken by Frank Hurley.
- Location: Weddell Sea, Antarctica
- Elevation: 350 m (1,150 ft)

Rampart Berg was an iceberg discovered by the Imperial Trans-Antarctic Expedition in 1915, estimated by Frank Worsley to have been 1150 feet (350 metres) tall, with a thousand feet of that below the sea. According to expedition photographer Frank Hurley, the berg’s prominence throughout the months in which they were stuck in the ice caused the members of the expedition “to look upon it as an old friend”.

== Events ==
Rampart Berg had been about 10 miles from the Endurance shortly before late March 1915, but was located about a mile away from the ship as of 27 March. On 18 April 1915 expedition leader Sir Ernest Shackleton noted that Rampart Berg was drifting away from the Endurance. On 20 August 1915, with the Endurance trapped in ice, Worsley, Hurley and Lionel Greenstreet went on a trip to Rampart Berg, with them getting into trouble when they journeyed onto thinner, younger ice unable to hold their weight. The three only escaped by turning quickly and getting onto thicker ice. On the same day, a change in the position of Rampart Berg relative to the Endurance notified Shackleton that the ice pack the ship was stuck in was moving, indicating that pressure ridges would soon be crushing against the side of the ship.
