= David Knights-Whittome =

British photographer (1876–1943)

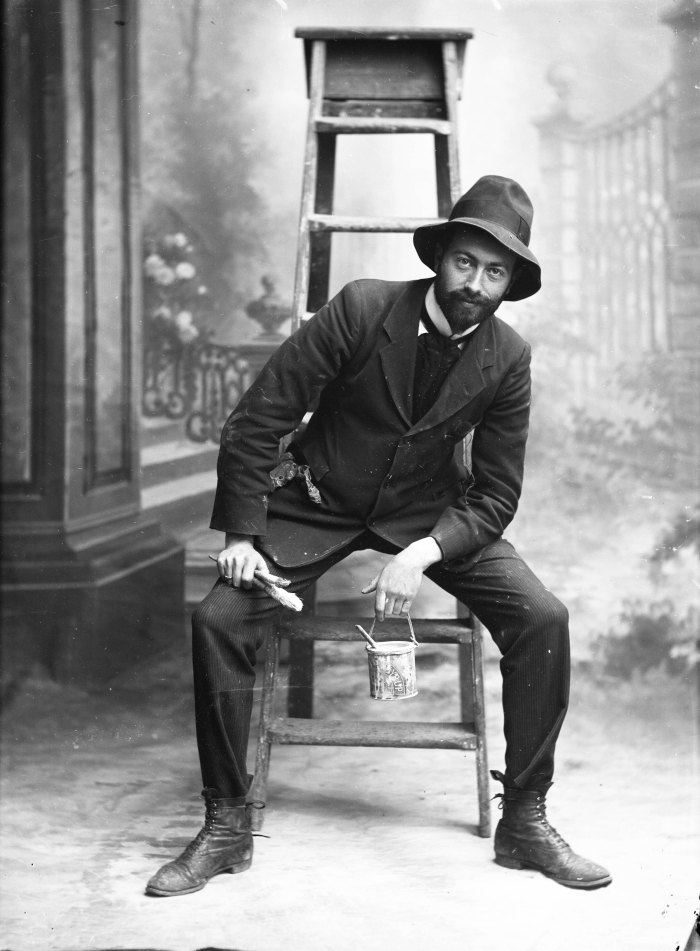
- Self portrait
- Born: David Knights Whittome; 29 December 1876; Greenwich, England
- Died: 4 November 1943 (aged 66)
- Resting place: Sandridge
- Occupation: Photographer
- Known for: Royal clients; Mayor of St Albans

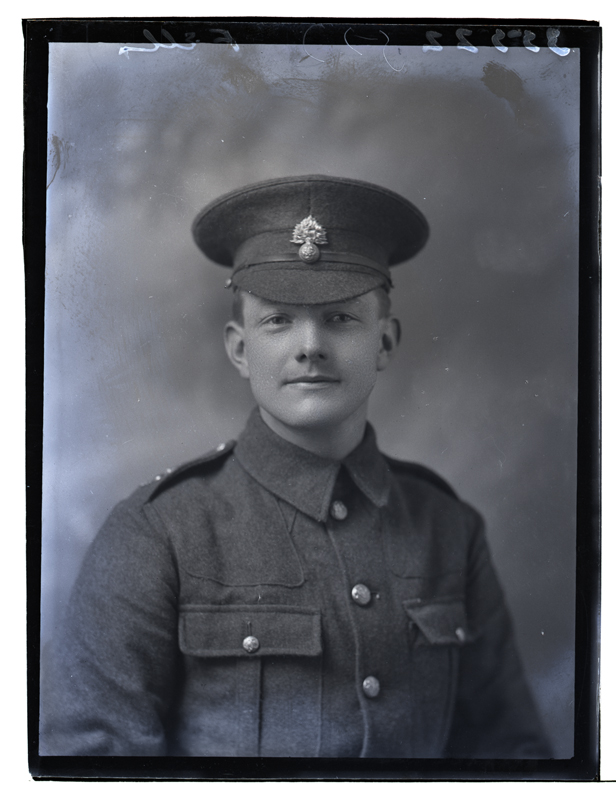
"E Fell, Esq, 31 Mar 1915", an example of Knights-Whittome's portraiture, from the Sutton Archives collection

David Knights-Whittome (born David Knights Whittome, 1876) was a British portrait photographer, whose clients included royalty.

Knights-Whittome was born on 29 December 1876 in Greenwich. His parents were Joseph Whittome, a warehouseman and a Baptist minister, and Eunice Smith. He had six older siblings, although three died in infancy.

In 1897, he worked out of the County Studio, in Hereford, and in Edmonton. He subsequently operated from his shops at 24 Station Road, Epsom and in Sutton. From 1905, he began hyphenating his name.

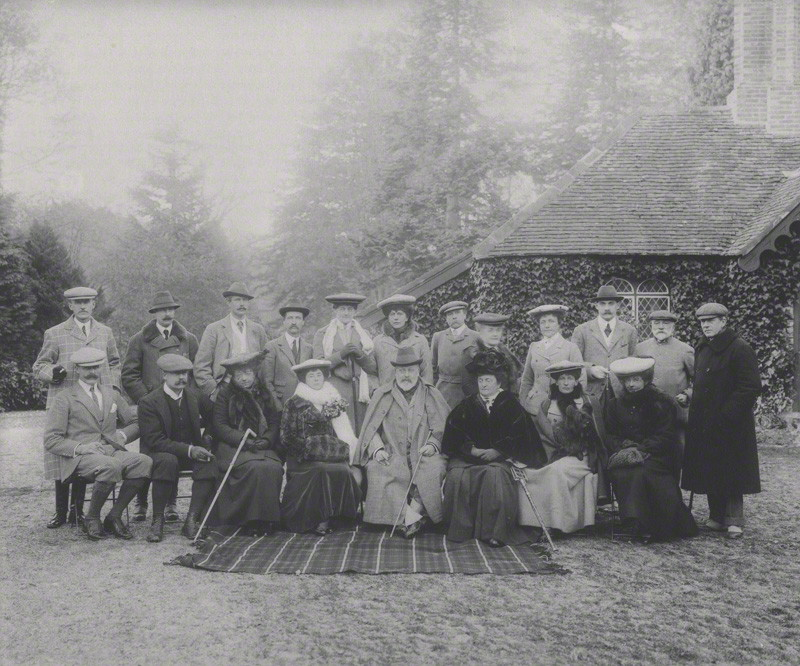
Knights-Whittome's picture "Members of the Marlborough House Set", 23 November 1904, now in the National Portrait Gallery. Edward VII in centre.

Among his subjects were Edward VII, George V, Prince Edward (later Edward VIII), Alfonso XIII of Spain, Manuel II of Portugal and Queen Maud of Norway. He was also one of the official photographers at Prince Edward's 1911 investiture as Prince of Wales at Carnarvon Castle. He was awarded a Royal Warrant of Appointment in the same year.

He married Sarah Elizabeth "Bessie" Draper in Hertford on 4 June 1907. They had two sons, Maurice and Ronald. On his retirement, the couple moved to St Albans where served on the city council and county council, and as mayor for the year 1940–1941. He died on 4 November 1943 and is buried at Sandridge. He was pre-deceased by Ronald, who had died in 1941 while serving as a wing commander with the Royal Air Force during World War II.

David Knights-Whittome was a member of the Royal Photographic Society from 1896 to 1905. His collection of glass plate negatives and his papers are held by the Sutton Local Studies & Archives Centre, where the negatives have been digitised by a project branded "Past on Glass", funded with a £95,000 grant from the Heritage Lottery Fund. Five of his works are in the collection of the National Portrait Gallery.
