= History of in vitro fertilisation =

In vitro fertilisation (IVF) is a reproductive technique that goes back more than half a century. In 1959 the first birth in a nonhuman mammal resulting from IVF occurred, and in 1978 the world's first baby conceived by IVF was born. As medicine advanced, IVF was transformed from natural research to a stimulated clinical treatment. There have been many refinements in the IVF process, and today millions of births have occurred with the help of IVF all over the world.

== Steps prior to human IVF ==
Prior to the development of IVF in humans, Walter Heape, a physician and professor at the University of Cambridge, was doing research on reproduction in animals. In November 1890, Heape reported the first successful embryo transfer in a mammal (rabbit) in the Proceedings of the Royal Society of London. The litter had offspring with phenotypes of both the birth mother and donor mother rabbits.

As early as 1934, Gregory Goodwin Pincus and Ernst Vincenz Enzmann tried to perform IVF in rabbits. Although the pregnancy was successful, it was later determined that the fertilisation occurred in vivo (in the body).

Miriam Menkin was the first to extract an intact fertilised egg. In 1948, John Rock and Miriam Menkin retrieved over 800 oocytes, of which 138 were exposed to spermatozoa in vitro. They published their findings in the American Journal of Obstetrics and Gynecology. There was a transient biochemical pregnancy reported by Australian Foxton School researchers in 1953.

In 1958, Anne McLaren and John Biggers published a landmark paper in the journal Nature, outlining how they had successfully grown mouse embryos in vitro and transferred them into female mice. This showed it was possible to mix a sperm and an egg outside a female reproductive system and create a healthy embryo.

In 1959, Min Chueh Chang at the Worcester Foundation, proved fertilisation in vitro was capable of proceeding to a birth of a live rabbit. Chang's discovery was seminal, as it clearly demonstrated that oocytes fertilised in vitro were capable of developing if transferred into the uterus.

== Early, non-viable pregnancies ==
The first pregnancy achieved through in vitro human fertilisation of a human oocyte was reported in The Lancet from the Monash University team of Carl Wood, John Leeton and Alan Trounson in 1973, although it lasted only a few days and would today be called a biochemical pregnancy. Landrum Shettles attempted to perform IVF in 1973, but his departmental chairman interdicted the procedure at the last moment. There was also an ectopic pregnancy reported by Patrick Steptoe, Robert Edwards and Jean Purdy in 1976.

== Early babies ==
Steptoe, Edwards and Purdy started collaborating in human IVF research in 1968. In 1977, Steptoe and Edwards successfully carried out a pioneering conception which resulted in the birth of the world's first baby to be conceived by IVF, Louise Brown, on 25 July 1978 in Oldham General Hospital, Greater Manchester, UK. Her younger sister, Natalie Brown, was the first person conceived with IVF to have children of her own, in 1999.

In October 1978, it was reported that Subash Mukhopadhyay, a physician from Hazaribagh, India was performing experiments on his own with primitive instruments and a household refrigerator and this resulted in a test tube baby, later named as "Durga" (alias Kanupriya Agarwal) who was born on 3 October 1978. However, state authorities prevented him from presenting his work at scientific conferences and, in the absence of scientific evidence, his work is not recognised by the international scientific community. These days, however, Mukhopadhyay's contribution is acknowledged in works dealing with the subject.

Steptoe and Edwards were responsible for the world's first confirmed boy conceived by IVF, Alastair Montgomery, born on 14 January 1979 in Glasgow. A team led by Ian Johnston and Alex Lopata were responsible for Australia's first baby conceived by IVF, Candice Reed, born on 23 June 1980 in Melbourne.

== Development of stimulated IVF treatments ==
It was the subsequent use of stimulated cycles with clomiphene citrate and the use of human chorionic gonadotrophin (hCG) to control and time oocyte maturation, thus controlling the time of collection, that converted IVF from a research tool to a clinical treatment.

This was followed by a total of 14 pregnancies resulting in nine births in 1981 with the Monash University team. Howard W. Jones and Georgeanna Seegar Jones at the Eastern Virginia Medical School in Norfolk, Virginia, further improved stimulated cycles by incorporating the use of a follicle-stimulating hormone (uHMG). This then became known as controlled ovarian hyperstimulation (COH). Another step forward was the use of gonadotrophin-releasing hormone agonists (GnRHA), thus decreasing the need for monitoring by preventing premature ovulation, and more recently gonadotrophin-releasing hormone antagonists (GnRH Ant), which have a similar function. The additional use of the oral contraceptive pill has allowed the scheduling of IVF cycles, which has made the treatment far more convenient for both staff and patients.

== Subsequent refinements ==
The ability to freeze and subsequently thaw and transfer embryos has significantly improved the feasibility of IVF use. In 1983, Alan Trounson and Linda Mohr reported the first pregnancy which used embryo cryopreservation (frozen human embryos). However, this embryo was not carried to term. In December 1983, the first baby was born using this method which happened to be twins.

The ability to freeze and preserve a woman's eggs to be used at a later date has also had impacts on IVF use. In 1986, Dr. Christopher Chen reported the first pregnancy which used oocyte cryopreservation (frozen eggs). The ability to freeze sperm has also been possible for generations. Both of these options have been beneficial in IVF use to allow people who must undergo radiation or menopause to still have children.

Another important development in IVF was when egg donation became publicly available. The first pregnancy from egg donation occurred in 1983. In the United States, the first child born from egg donation occurred on February 3, 1984. This has allowed those who are unable to conceive a child due infertility or lack of eggs to become parents.

Intracytoplasmic sperm injection (ICSI) of single sperms was developed by Gianpiero D. Palermo et al. in Brussels (UZ Brussel), 1992. This has enabled men with minimal sperm production to achieve pregnancies. ICSI is sometimes used in conjunction with sperm recovery, using a testicular fine needle or open testicular biopsy. Using this method, some men with Klinefelter's syndrome, and so would be otherwise infertile, have been able to achieve pregnancy. Thus, IVF has become the ultimate solution for most fertility problems, moving from tubal disease to male factor, idiopathic subfertility, endometriosis, advanced maternal age, and anovulation not responding to ovulation induction.

== Recognition ==
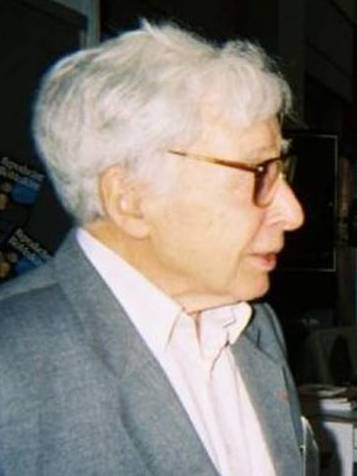
Robert Edwards in 2010, the year he won the Nobel Prize for his development of IVF

Robert Edwards was awarded the 2010 Nobel Prize in Physiology or Medicine "for the development of in vitro fertilization". Steptoe and Jean Purdy were not eligible for consideration as the Nobel Prize is not awarded posthumously. Carl Wood was dubbed "the father of IVF (in vitro fertilisation)" for having pioneered the use of frozen embryos.

== Success of IVF ==
In the US, ART cycles started in 2006 resulted in 41,343 births (54,656 infants), which is slightly more than 1% of total US births.

The Society for Assisted Reproductive Technology (SART) reported that in 2012 alone IVF resulted in about 61,740 babies born in the United States. The CDC estimates that IVF results in about 1 to 2 percent of births in the United States every year.

In 2016, IVF resulted in an estimated 76,930 live-born infants in the United States. As of 2015 over one million babies have been born as a result of IVF in the U.S. and over 8 million worldwide.
