= Gary and Thaddeus Lewingdon =

American serial killers

Gary Lewingdon
- Born: Gary James Lewingdon; February 14, 1940; Ohio, U.S.
- Died: October 24, 2004 (aged 64); Columbus, Ohio, U.S.
- Other name: "The .22 Caliber Killer"
- Conviction: Murder
- Penalty: Life imprisonment

Details
- Victims: 10
- Span of crimes: 1977–1978
- Country: United States
- State: Ohio
- Date apprehended: December 8, 1978

Thaddeus Lewingdon
- Born: Thaddeus Charles Lewingdon; December 22, 1936; Ohio, U.S.
- Died: April 16, 1989 (aged 52); Orient Prison Hospital, Pickaway County, Ohio, U.S.
- Other name: "The .22 Caliber Killer"
- Conviction: Murder
- Penalty: Life imprisonment

Details
- Victims: 9
- Span of crimes: 1977–1978
- Country: United States
- State: Ohio
- Date apprehended: December 11, 1978

Gary James Lewingdon (February 14, 1940 – October 24, 2004) and Thaddeus Charles Lewingdon (December 22, 1936 – April 16, 1989) were American siblings and serial killers, who committed a series of ten murders in different Ohio counties from December 1977 to December 1978 for the motive of robbery. As a murder weapon, the criminals used .22 caliber pistols, due to which they received the nickname The .22 Caliber Killers. In 1979, both brothers were sentenced to several terms of life imprisonment.

== Early years ==
Little is known about the early years of the Lewingdon brothers. It is known that the older brother, Thaddeus, was born on December 22, 1936. After leaving school, he graduated from the Cleveland Institute of Electronics, and worked as a technical specialist at the Columbus Steel Drum Company in Columbus. He was married, and had three children.

The younger brother, Gary, was born on February 14, 1940. In 1958, after graduation, he enlisted in the army and was assigned to the Air Force. He served in Vietnam during the early period of the war, and after four years, he resigned in 1962 and returned his mother's home, where he lived until 1977, when he met a woman who would later become his wife.

Gary led a marginal lifestyle and was forced to engage in low-skilled labor and from 1962 to 1977 was repeatedly prosecuted for offences such as petty theft, obscene behavior in public places and illegal possession of weapons. In 1977, Thaddeus divorced his wife and was in a serious psycho-emotional state, as a result of which his brother, having financial difficulties, persuaded him to commit a series of robberies.

== Serial murders ==
The Lewingdon brothers chose strangers away from their homes as their targets. The killings were particularly cruel; ten to seventeen shots fired at each victim. The murder spree began on December 10, 1977, when the brothers shot and robbed 38-year-old Joyce Vermillion and 33-year-old Karen Dodrill at a bar in Newark. No witnesses were present at the crime scene, and Dodrill died afterwards on her 34th birthday.

On February 13, 1978, the brothers broke into the property of an entrepreneur, 52-year-old Robert McCann, who owned a nightclub in Franklin County. During the robbery, they shot McCann, his 77-year-old mother Dorothy, and his girlfriend, 26-year-old Christine Hardman, with several shots to the head. On April 8, 1978, the killers arrived in the village of Granville, Licking County, where they attacked 77-year-old Jenkins Jones, shooting him and his four dogs before stealing money and valuables from the house. The Lewingdons' next victim was a priest, 35-year-old Gerald Fields, who was killed on April 30 in Fairfield County.

On May 22, 1978, the brothers committed a double murder in northeast Columbus, where 47-year-old Jerry Martin, vice president and general manager of "Perma-stone," and his wife Martha lived. Before stealing all valuables, the brothers shot Martin and Martha through the window screen. They left the crime scene without leaving any clues for the investigators. In the course of a forensic ballistic examination of the bullets pulled from the bodies and casings found on the scene, it was established at the end of May 1978 that all the victims were killed with the same pistol. It was also found that another .22 caliber pistol was used in the spouses' murder, which established that there were two criminals present.

In the fall of 1978, a conflict occurred between the two brothers, with Thaddeus refusing to participate in further joint criminal activities. As a result, Gary, having financial difficulties for the upcoming Christmas Day, robbed and killed 56-year-old Joseph Annick on December 4, 1978. On December 8, while trying to use Annick's stolen credit card to make a purchase, Gary Lewingdon was arrested by the store security service and was taken to the police station. During the interrogation, he began to cooperate with the investigation and confessed to the crimes, on the basis of which Thaddeus was arrested on December 11, 1978. Three days later, both brothers were charged with murder.

== Trial ==
The Lewingdon brothers were charged with 10 counts of murder and aggravated theft. In January 1979, they abandoned their testimonies and insisted on their innocence. During the search of the accused's apartments, the murder weapons were found, as well as a number of objects that were later identified by the victims' relatives. This evidence, coupled with the findings from the ballistic and fingerprint examinations, indicated the brothers' involvement in the crimes. In February, Thaddeus confessed to killing Vermillion, Dodrill, Jones and committing a number of thefts, after which he was sentenced to life imprisonment.

In the spring, Thaddeus was brought before a court in Franklin County on charges of complicity in another 6 murders. In April, he was found guilty and received another 6 sentences of life imprisonment as punishment. In mid-1979, Gary Lewingdon was found guilty of killing 8 people and committing a number of thefts. He also received life imprisonment.

== Aftermath ==
After being imprisoned, Gary Lewingdon began to demonstrate deviant behavior and signs of suicidal ideation, as a result of which he was transferred to Lima State Hospital, where he was caught trying to escape in March 1982. In the early 2000s, Gary was diagnosed with a group of cardiovascular diseases, and their complications eventually took his life on October 24, 2004. His brother Thaddeus died on April 16, 1989, from lung cancer.

== See also ==
- List of serial killers in the United States
