= Lionel Greenstreet =

British polar explorer (1889–1979)

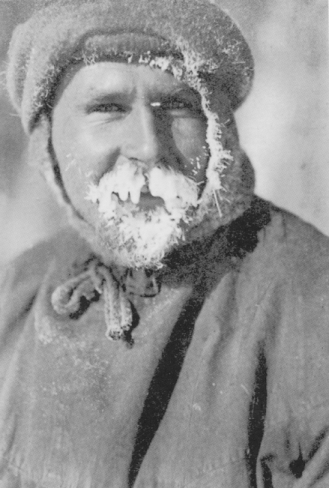
- Lionel Greenstreet, taken on board Endurance by Frank Hurley
- Born: 20 March 1889
- Died: 13 January 1979 (aged 89)
- Occupations: Sailor; Marine insurance
- Spouses: Millie Baddeley Muir; Audrey Day

Lionel Greenstreet (20 March 1889 – 13 January 1979) was the first officer of the Endurance and a member of the Imperial Trans-Antarctic Expedition of 1914–1917, for which he was awarded the Polar Medal. When he died on 13 January 1979, he was the last survivor of the Weddell Sea party within the expedition.

== Biography ==
Greenstreet was born into a family of officers in the merchant navy of the British Empire; his father Herbert Edward Greenstreet had been granted captain's papers by the New Zealand Shipping Company. At age 15, Greenstreet became a sea cadet, never returning to school. He gained his Master's certificate in 1911. As a young ship's officer, he wrote to the Captain of the Endurance, Frank Worsley in 1914, asking to be considered for a berth. His request arrived just as the ship's named First Officer had thrown up his papers to accept service in World War I, which had just broken out. Greenstreet was told to report to the Endurance in Plymouth Sound for an interview; and upon arrival, after brief inspection by Worsley he was abruptly told that the position of First Officer was his and that he had twenty-four hours to prepare for the departure of the vessel to the Southern Ocean. The fledgling ship's officer recalled that after considerable effort he had settled his affairs and reported aboard the ship, which then sailed 30 minutes after his arrival.

The expedition's overall commander was the explorer Ernest Shackleton, and the goal of the Endurance was Vahsel Bay on the coast of Antarctica, from which Shackleton and the shore party hoped to cross the icy continent by dogsled; but on 18 January 1915, a few miles short of this destination, the ship was beset by ice and frozen into heavy pack from which she would not emerge. Greenstreet's duties changed with the new status of his ship; he kept deck watches in an attempt to find a lead of open water through which the ship could extricate itself, and joined a crew assigned to work below-decks in a futile attempt to stop the leaks that the ice was beginning to punch through the ship's hull. Despite the work of Greenstreet and his seamen and fellow ship's officers, Shackleton was forced to issue the order to abandon ship on 27 October. The expedition's 28 members and ship's company had to camp together as castaways on the frozen surface of the Weddell Sea.

=== Castaway ===
After the Endurance was abandoned, Greenstreet's duties again changed. He was given brief command of a team of sled dogs, and helped to hunt for fresh meat to supplement the castaways' inadequate supply of food. Shackleton later recalled with gratitude how Greenstreet and his hunting partner, Alexander Macklin, had killed and brought in a Weddell seal weighing 800 pounds.

At a slightly later stage of their self-rescue, after the icy campsite of the men of the Endurance had drifted northward into warmer water, the change in water temperature caused their refuge to melt and on 9 April 1916 they were forced to climb aboard the open boats that they had salvaged from their former vessel. Shackleton and his men had salvaged three lifeboats, and Greenstreet was the fourth-ranking member of the expedition. He accompanied his captain, Frank Worsley, in the Dudley Docker during the eight-day ordeal that marked the progress of the open-boat flotilla to a new and more secure campsite on Elephant Island in the archipelago of the South Shetlands.

Greenstreet, although characterised by Worsley as "a fine seaman", was not chosen to accompany the six-man party that set out from Elephant Island to South Georgia Island. Instead the former first officer was detailed to a two-man party, working with William Bakewell, to alter bits and scraps of salvaged ship's canvas into a jury-rigged canvas deck to enable the sole remaining sail-worthy lifeboat of the ship's company, the James Caird, to navigate in the open sea. Worsley, whose life would depend upon the success of this work, describes it as follows:

Frozen like a board and caked with ice, the canvas was sewn, in painful circumstances, by two cheery optimists – Greenstreet, Chief Officer of the Endurance, and Bakewell, a Canadian [sic] AB. The only way they could do it was by holding the frozen canvas in the blubber fire till it thawed, often burning their fingers, while the oily smoke got in their eyes and noses, half-blinding and choking them. Then they sewed, often getting frostbitten and having to use great care that the difficult sewing with cold, brittle sail needles did not break all of our now scanty supply. All the time, while repeating the unpleasant task of thawing a length, and sewing it, 'Horace' [Greenstreet] was irrepressibly cracking his sailor jokes and Bakewell replying.

The sails hoisted, Shackleton, Worsley and the James Caird set out into the Southern Ocean. Greenstreet and his 21 fellow castaways remained encamped on Elephant Island, and were rescued on 30 August 1916.

=== Later life and character ===
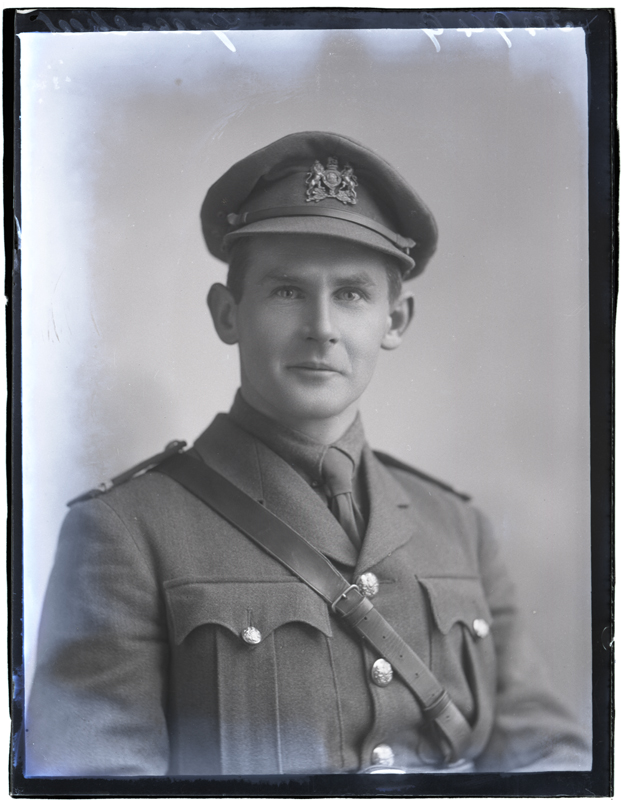
Lt Greenstreet, photographed by David Knights-Whittome in 1917

After the end of the expedition and with World War I continuing, Greenstreet was commissioned as a second lieutenant in the Inland Water Transport arm of the Royal Engineers in 1917, serving in supply barges on the Tigris in British-occupied Mesopotamia. He married Millie Baddeley Muir in 1917. After the war, Greenstreet chose shore life, working in marine insurance.

He saw active service in World War II as an officer in the Royal Naval Reserve. Greenstreet left command of Admiralty tug Freebooter in January 1942 to become rescue tug equipment officer in charge of the US shipbuilding programme of rescue tugs for the Admiralty under lend-lease.

After the war, he resumed insurance work prior to retirement. His wife Millie died in 1955 and he married Audrey Day.

Worsley, who had chosen Greenstreet on very short notice to join the fateful expedition, repeatedly paid tribute to him in his memoirs. During the first open-boat journey, "Greenstreet was splendid, never losing hope and always ready to crack some appalling sailor-joke." On Elephant Island Worsley's last sight of Greenstreet prior to the Southern Ocean trip was his former First Officer, "cheerfully profane as ever", helping to bag stones to be loaded onto the James Caird as ballast.

== Sources ==
- Shackleton, Ernest (1999) [1919]. South: The Endurance Expedition. New York City: Signet/New American Library. ISBN 9780451198808.
- Worsley, F.A. (1977). Shackleton's Boat Journey. New York City: W.W. Norton & Co. ISBN 0-393-08759-X.
