= Salisbury fuel depot attack =

Military action during the Rhodesian Bush War

- Part of Rhodesian Bush War
- Type: RPG attack
- Location: Salisbury, Rhodesia
- Target: BP Shell fuel depot
- Date: 11 December 1978; 11:00pm
- Executed by: ZANLA
- Outcome: 17 million gallons of fuel valued at $18 million wiped out; A quarter of Rhodesia's fuel reserves destroyed
- Casualties: 0 killed Unknown injured

The Salisbury fuel depot attack was a raid on the fuel depot in Salisbury's Southerton industrial area on December 11, 1978, during the Rhodesian Bush War conducted by a ZANLA sabotage unit. The attack resulted in millions of dollars’ worth of damages and the destruction of more than a quarter of Rhodesia's fuel.

== Attack ==
On the night of 11 December 1978, a unit of 8 ZANLA commandos led by a former bus driver-turned guerrilla, Member Kuvhiringidza, including comrades Nhamo, Lobo, Bombs, No Rest, America Mudzvanyiriri, Brian Chimurenga and Poison Waungana penetrated the outskirts of Salisbury (now Harare) and fired a volley of rockets and incendiary device rounds into the main oil storage depot. The storage tanks burned for five days, giving off a column of smoke that could be seen 130 km (80 mi) away. The fire destroyed 22 of the 28 giant storage tanks and wiped out about 17 million gallons of fuel, a quarter of Rhodesia's fuel reserves. After surveying the burnt out ruins, Ian Smith described the sabotage as being the one of Rhodesia's biggest setbacks since the war began.
